= Zafiro Records =

Spanish record label

- Founded: 1952
- Defunct: 1999
- Distributors: Decca, Coco, Cetra
- Genre: Various
- Country of origin: Spain
- Location: Madrid

Zafiro Records was a major Spanish record label that issued records from the 1950s until the 1980s. In addition to issuing recordings by Spanish artists, the label issued many recordings by US and UK artists. Artists to have their recordings issued on the label include Juan Bau, Luisito Gasán, Malena Gracia, Buddy Guy, Los Brincos, Marisol, and Ornella Vanoni etc.

== Background ==
The Zafiro label was established in 1952. According to the March 27, 1982 issue of Billboard, the company was managed by Esteban Garcia Morencos. Under Morencos was Antonio Ortega, and international business was handled by Angel Prieto.

Artists that established their careers with the label were, Maria Dolores Pradera, Los Brincos, Los Relampagos, Juan and Junior, Juan Pardo, Massiel and Joan Manuel Serrat. Rock groups that were signed to the label included Tequila, Obus, Baron Rojo and Leno. One of the artists that had a no. 1 hit in Spain on the label was the UK pop group The Korgis with "Everybody's Got to Learn Sometime". At least three of Miguel Fleta's recordings have been issued on Zafiro.

According to Continuum Encyclopedia of Popular Music of the World, Volume 1, the label founded the Chapa Disco label. It also changed its name to Serdisco in the 1980s. The label would eventually be acquired by RCA in 1999.

== History ==
=== 1950s to 1960s ===
In December 1962, artists signed to the label included guitarist Narcisco Yepes, the Maravella Orchestra, solo artists; Nella Columbo, Carlos Acuna, Maria Dolores Pradera, Carlitos Romano and Lolita Garrido, groups; Hermanas Benitez, Losa LLaneros, Los Rivero and Los Quechuas.

It was reported by Cash Box in the magazine's June 20, 1964 issue that Zafiro executives Esteban Garcia Morencos and Eduardo Sancho had travelled to the UK. A contract between Zafiro and UK record company Decca had been signed. This was to enable worldwide distribution of Zafiro's recordings via Decca. A rumor had also emerged that Zafiro had started up a new label which was to be just for youth-oriented music. Former Fonogram promotion manager Luis Satorius was to be the new label's A&R man.

In October 1967, on a Zafiro release, the recording duo Juan & Junior had a top ten hit in Spain with "Nos falta fe".

=== 1970s ===
In 1970, Record World had reported in the November 7 issue that Esteban Morencos had gone to Milan to sign a three-year deal with Cetra Records for their catalogue's distribution in Spain.

It was reported by Billboard in the magazine's October 2, 1976 issue that the US based Coco label had entered into a deal with Zafiro to handle the distribution of the label's catalogue in the United States, Dominican Republic and Puerto Rico. Participants in the deal making were Sam Coff and Harvey Averne, Coco partners and Zafiro's president Esteban Morencos. With the new deal in place, Juan Bau's album Penas and La Otra Espana by makers of the hit "Eres Tu", Mocedades were the first records to be handled under the new agreement. At that time, Zafiro had also released Canciones de Amor which was a compilation of hits for artist Joan Manuel Serrat who had recently returned to Spain after being away for a year.

=== 1980s to 1990s ===
In the March 27, 1982 issue of Billboard an ad showed the label had achieved success with 29 platinum and 15 gold records.

In 1998 Blanca Salcedo had come to Zafiro from the Spanish arm of Columbia Records. In 1999 Salcedo was appointed to the position of general manager of RCA Spain. Also that year RCA in Spain had acquired Zafiro.
