= Tito García =

Spanish actor

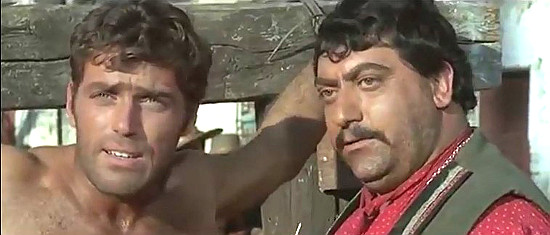
- David Bailey with Tito Garcia in Seven Guns for the MacGregors, 1967
- Born: Pablo García González; August 17, 1931; Salamanca
- Died: May 6, 2003 (aged 71); Madrid
- Occupation: Actor

Pablo García González, known as Tito García (1931–2003) was a Spanish actor.

== Biography ==
Working as a torero in his youth, he played a minor role in Pelusa (1961). After this, he intended to dedicate himself to an acting career, and came to be one of the most frequently featured supporting actor in the Spanish cinema of the 1960s and 1970s. He often played villains in the Spaghetti Western genre of the 1960s. During his later career, during the 1980s and 1990s, he reduced his activity in cinema productions and appeared more frequently on television. He died in April 2003 aged 71.

== Filmography ==
=== Films ===
- La quiniela (1960) as Ayudante del locutor de radio (uncredited)
- Pelusa (1960)
- Bello recuerdo (1961)
- Salto mortal (1962)
- The Awful Dr. Orlof (1962)
- Héroes de blanco (1962)
- Accidente 703 (1962) as Pedro
- The Twin Girls (1963)
- Harbor Lights (1963) as Cardinal's Man (uncredited)
- Han robado una estrella (1963) as Elías
- Gunfight at Red Sands (1963) as Herrero (uncredited)
- Los conquistadores del Pacífico (1963)
- El llanero (1963)
- Man of the Cursed Valley (1964) as Indio
- Sonaron cuatro balazos (1964) as Jurado
- Black Angel of the Mississippi (1964) as Frank Murphy
- I gemelli del Texas (1964) as Jeff
- Bullets Don't Argue (1964) as Miguel
- La tumba del pistolero (1964) as Cochero
- Relevo para un pistolero (1964) as O'Hara
- Cavalry Charge (1964) as Fur Trader Peter Barton
- El dedo en el gatillo (1965) as Zubarri
- Fistful of Knuckles (1965) as Pablo el terrible
- Shoot to Kill (1965) as Gambler
- Wild Kurdistan (1965) as Sergeant (uncredited)
- In a Colt's Shadow (1965) as Bartender (uncredited)
- Los oficios de Cándido (1965) as Sisebuto
- Ringo's Big Night (1966) as Bandit (uncredited)
- La armada Brancaleone (1966) as Filuccio
- Seven Magnificent Guns (1966) as Abel
- Operación Goldman (1966) as Emanuel Garcia
- Rififi in Amsterdam (1966) as Ben
- The Ugly Ones (1966) as Zacarías
- The Tough One (1966)
- Up the MacGregors (1967) as Miguelito
- I'll Kill Him and Return Alone (1967) as Francisco (uncredited)
- Target Frankie (1967) as Mac
- O.K. Yevtushenko (1967) as Capt. Milhavikah
- God Forgives... I Don't! (1967) as Tam-Tam
- Una ladrona para un espía (1967) as Colombiano
- Escuela de enfermeras (1968)
- Un tren para Durango (1968) as Pedrp Arista (uncredited)
- Crónica de un atraco (1969) as Fred Mulligan
- Go for Broke (1969) as Carranza's Man
- I Live for Your Death (1968) Bit Part (uncredited)
- Operación Mata Hari (1968)
- No somos de piedra (1968) as Cliente de la farmacia
- Llego, veo, disparo (1968) as Corpulent member of Garrito's horde
- Uno a uno, sin piedad (1968) as farmer
- The Mercenary (1968) as Garcia's Cousin (uncredited)
- Tiempos de Chicago (1969) as Turi (uncredited)
- América rugiente (1969) as Prison Warden Charlie
- El taxi de los conflictos (1969) as Policía casado
- Dead Are Countless (1969) as Ted (uncredited)
- A Bullet for Sandoval (1969) as Mexican Rancher (uncredited)
- Boot Hill (1969) as Finch Henchman Wrestling with the Two Dwarfs (uncredited)
- El corsario (1970)
- Sabata the Killer (1970) as Fuller
- La salamandra del desierto (1970)
- El gran crucero (1970)
- La Lola, dicen que no vive sola (1970) as Encargado Grandes Almacenes (uncredited)
- Compañeros (1970) as Pepito Tigrero (uncredited)
- Palabra de Rey (1970, Short)
- La otra residencia (1970) as Dueño del bar
- El apartamento de la tentación (1971) as Assistante de Barami
- A Town Called Hell (1971) as Malhombre
- Los corsarios (1971)
- The Light at the Edge of the World (1971) as Emilio
- Aunque la hormona se vista de seda... (1971)
- Catlow (1971) as Pedro
- Las ibéricas F.C. (1971)
- Blindman (1971) as Train Engineer (uncredited)
- Bad Man's River (1971)
- Kill! Kill! Kill! Kill! (1971) as Spyros Bizanthios
- Don't Turn the Other Cheek (1971) as Holdup-Man (uncredited)
- Vente a ligar al Oeste (1972)
- Fabulous Trinity (1972) as Charles Wesley alias Ponzio Trinidad
- La cabina (1972, TV Short) as Señor corpulento
- Fat Brothers of Trinity (1973) as Charles
- The Scarlet Letter (1973) as Church Attendant
- Die zweite Ermordung des Hundes (1973, TV Movie) as Kraftprotz
- Yankee Dudler (1973)
- Bell from Hell (1973) as Don Pedro's Hunting Partner
- Shanghai Joe (1973) as Jesus, Slave Trader (uncredited)
- The Spikes Gang (1974) as Mexican Man (uncredited)
- Joe y Margerito (1974) as Acidumuriatico
- Chicas de alquiler (1974) as Cosme
- Dick Turpin (1974) as Mesonero
- Onofre (1974)
- La mortaja (1974)
- Shoot First... Ask Questions Later (1975) as Watson Brother
- Zorro (1975) as Chicken Vendor (uncredited)
- Who's Afraid of Zorro (1975) as Capitaine Duval
- Bienvenido, Mister Krif (1975)
- Leonor (1975)
- Solo ante el Streaking (1975) as Pedro
- El poder del deseo (1975) as Barman
- School of Death (1975)
- El libro de buen amor II (1976) as Don Carnal
- Y le llamaban Robin Hood (1976)
- Alcalde por elección (1976)
- Haz la loca... no la guerra (1976) as Pepe
- Caperucita y Roja (1977)
- El puente (1977) as Camarero racista
- Eva, limpia como los chorros del oro (1977) as Carnicero
- The Pyjama Girl Case (1978) as The fat man in the final foursome (uncredited)
- Un aventurero de via estrecha (1978)
- El terrorista (1978) as Dueño del bar
- Madrid al desnudo (1979) as Juanito (as Tito Garcia)
- Supersonic Man (1979) as Joe
- Los energéticos (1979) as Cura
- El alcalde y la política (1980) as Concejal
- The Beasts' Carnival (1980) as Compinche de El Palanqueta
- La guerra de los niños (1980) as Guardián
- Duelo del Dragón y el Tigre (1980) as Boss
- La enfermera, el marica y el cachondo de Don Pepino (1981) as Giuseppe
- Queremos un hijo tuyo (1981) as Hermano de Martirio
- Night of the Werewolf (1981) as First thief
- Black Jack (1981)
- La segunda guerra de los niños (1981) as Lucio
- Han violado a una mujer (1982) as Dueño del restaurante (uncredited)
- Los autonómicos (1982) as Colás
- Las noches secretas de Lucrecia Borgia (1982) as Grinta
- Piernas arriba (1982) as Tito
- Al este del oeste (1984) as Tafford, Blacksmith
- Divinas palabras (1987)
- Soldadito español (1988) as Sargento
- Don Juan, mi querido fantasma (1990) as Celador 1
- Seducción mortal (1990) as Gacho
- El robobo de la jojoya (1991) as Fran
- Something of Mine (1991) as Young Victim
- The Naked Target (1992) as Camionero 1
- El beso del sueño (1992) as El General
- Colón pirata (1992, TV Movie)
- No Smoking (1993, TV Movie)
- Belmonte (1995) as Picador 'El Brillante'
- África (1996) as Encargado del mercado
- The Dancer Upstairs (2002) as Admiral Prado
- 800 Bullets (2002) as Tonito (final film role)

=== TV series ===
- Crónicas de un pueblo (1971-1974) as Benito
- Cuentos y leyendas (1974-1976) as Carpintero
- Los libros (1974-1976) as Hombre en tren / Lego Bartolo
- El pícaro (1975) as El Jayán
- Kara Ben Nemsi Effendi (1975) as Tschurak / Kadi Helper
- Este señor de negro (1975) as Colista 3º
- El quinto jinete (1975) as Posadero
- Zum kleinen Fisch (1977) as Fischer
- Estudio 1 (1977)
- Curro Jiménez (1977)
- Es muß nicht immer Kaviar sein (1977)
- El hotel de las mil y una estrellas (1978-1979)
- Escrito en América (1979)
- Cervantes (1981) as Alcaide
- Verano azul (1982) as Comerciante
- Los gozos y las sombras (1982) as Cubeiro
- Proceso a Mariana Pineda (1984)
- Página de sucesos (1985) as Taxista
- Media naranja (1986) as Policía municipal
- Turno de oficio (1986) as Carnicero
- Eva y Adán, agencia matrimonial (1990)
- Farmacia de guardia (1992-1993) as Ceferino / Panadero / Cliente
- Habitación 503 (1993-1994)
- La mujer de tu vida 2 (1994)
- Compuesta y sin novio (1994)
- Médico de familia (1995) as Eulogio, panadero
- Los ladrones van a la oficina (1995) as Celestino
- Aquí hay negocio (1995)
- Colegio mayor (1996) as Taxista
- Kety no para (1997) as Braulio
- Hermanas (1998)
- Manos a la obra (1998)
- A las once en casa (1999)
- Periodistas (1998)
- Cuéntame cómo pasó (2002) as Piroperador
