= María José Goyanes =

Spanish actress

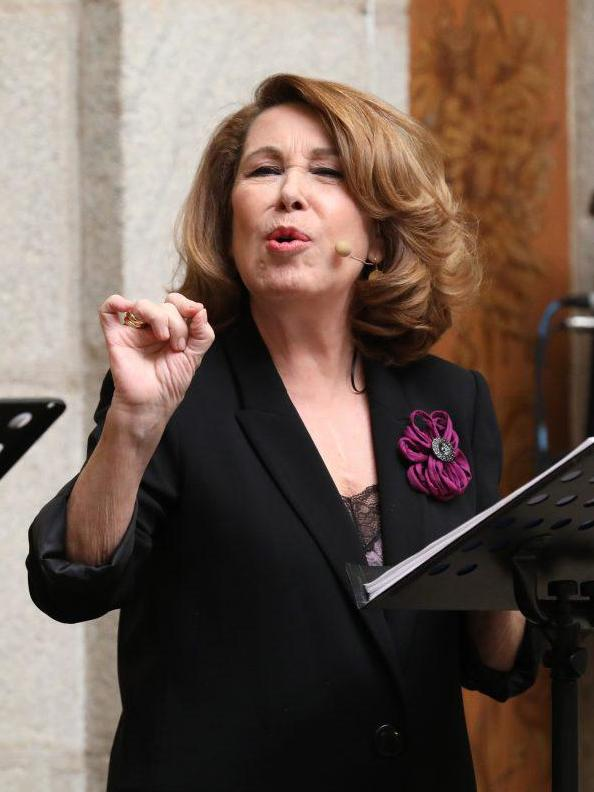
- María José Goyanes in 2019
- Born: María José Goyanes Muñoz; 8 December 1948 (age 76); Madrid, Spain
- Occupation: Actress
- Spouse: Manuel Collado Sillero (divorced c. 1985)
- Children: Javier Collado
- Mother: Mimí Muñoz
- Relatives: Conchita Goyanes (sister); Mara Goyanes (sister); Vicky Lagos (sister)

María José Goyanes Muñoz (born 8 December 1948) is a Spanish actress.

== Biography ==
María José Goyanes belongs to a family with a long artistic tradition: her grandfather was the actor Alfonso Muñoz, her mother the actress Mimí Muñoz, and her sisters Vicky Lagos, Mara, and Concha Goyanes. She was married to the producer and theater director Manuel Collado Sillero. Their son, Javier Collado, is also an actor.

She began working in the theater while still a child, performing with José María Rodero in El caballero de las espuelas de oro. She also made her debut in cinema and television when she was not yet 15. A dedicated theatrical actress, she formed her own company, staging works such as Chekhov's The Seagull.

Goyanes was the subject of a scandal during the 1975 production of the play Equus. In her role, alongside José Luis López Vázquez and Juan Ribó, she appeared topless, the first time this had occurred in Spanish theater since the end of Francoist censorship.

Her first big-screen appearance was in 1960's A Ray of Light by Luis Lucia, which also marked the debut of the prodigy Marisol. However her film career has not been extensive, comprising fewer than ten roles, almost all in the 1960s, including Megatón Ye-Ye (1965) by Jesús Yagüe, ¿Qué hacemos con los hijos? (1967), Los chicos del Preu (1967), and Novios 68 (1967), the last three by Pedro Lazaga.

She has had a more prominent presence on television, appearing on dozens of Televisión Española (TVE) shows, such as Novela and Estudio 1, notably her two interpretations of Doña Inés in Don Juan Tenorio (1968 and 1973) and of Paula in Tres sombreros de copa (1978).

She is also known for acting in the series El olivar de Atocha (1988), Yo, una mujer with Concha Velasco (1996), Yo soy Bea as Alicia Echegaray (2008–2009), and Hospital Central. In 2016 and 2017 she played Ana María, marquise of Madrigales, in Amar es para siempre.

== Awards ==
- Nominated for the Mayte Theater Award (1982), for Educating Rita
- Nominated for the Mayte Theater Award (1984)
- Nominated for the Mayte Theater Award (1985)
- Nominated for the Mayte Theater Award (1987)

== Selected plays ==
- Julius Caesar (1964) by William Shakespeare
- El caballero de las espuelas de oro (1964) by Alejandro Casona
- Love from a Stranger (1965)
- Romeo and Juliet (1971) by William Shakespeare, translated by Pablo Neruda
- Chao (1972) by Marc-Gilbert Sauvajon
- Usted también podrá disfrutar de ella (1973) by Ana Diosdado
- Equus (1975)
- The House of Bernarda Alba (1976) by Federico Garcia Lorca
- Lección de anatomía (1977)
- Las galas del difunto and The Captain's Daughter (1978) by Ramón del Valle-Inclán
- Cat on a Hot Tin Roof (1979) by Tennessee Williams
- Portrait of Lozana (1980) by Francisco Delicado, adapted by Rafael Alberti
- El galán fantasma (1981) by Pedro Calderón de la Barca
- The Seagull (1981) by Anton Chekhov
- Educating Rita (1982)
- Casandra (1983) by Benito Pérez Galdós
- Time and the Conways (1984) by J. B. Priestley
- Don Juan Tenorio (1984) by José Zorrilla
- The Phantom Lady (1990)
- Judit y el tirano (1992)
- La muerte y la doncella (1993)
- The Trojan Women (1994)
- Locas de amar (1996) by Paloma Pedrero
- An Ideal Husband (1996) by Oscar Wilde
- Te vas me dejas y me abandonas (1998) by Julio Escalada
- Don Juan (2001)
- Casa con dos puertas, mala es de guardar (2002) by Pedro Calderón de la Barca
- Don Quijote. Versión de cámara para cinco voces (2004)
- The Play About the Baby (2006) by Edward Albee
- Dile a mi hija que me fui de viaje (2007)
- Madre Paz (2010)
- De amor y lujuria (2012)
- El cielo que me tienes prometido (2016) by Ana Diosdado

== Television appearances ==
- Confidencias
  - Juan, el Toro (24 October 1964)
- Primera fila
  - Suspenso en amor (27 January 1965)
- Sábado 64
  - La Piconera (16 January 1965)
- Estudio 1
  - El jardín de las horas (3 November 1965)
  - Arsénico para dos (10 November 1965)
  - La dama del alba (1 December 1965)
  - Semana de Pasión (30 March 1966)
  - The Seagull (28 June 1967) – Nina
  - In the Best of Families (20 February 1968)
  - La pareja (11 June 1968)
  - Don Juan Tenorio (5 November 1968)
  - The Linden Tree (9 July 1970)
  - Felicidad conyugal (5 May 1972)
  - Don Juan Tenorio (2 November 1973)
  - Mario (25 January 1974)
  - Tres sombreros de copa (20 April 1978)
- Novela
  - El pobrecillo embustero (6 December 1965)
  - El regreso (21 December 1965)
  - La tragedia vive al lado (11 January 1966)
  - El último pobre (18 April 1966)
  - El viejo de Coupravay (27 June 1966)
  - Tom Sawyer, Detective (11 July 1966)
  - La Marquesa (29 August 1966)
  - La herencia (21 August 1967)
  - El pobrecito embustero (28 August 1967)
  - La balada del rey Gaspar (1 January 1968)
  - El silbo de la lechuza (5 February 1968)
  - Nosotros, los Rivero (2 June 1969)
  - Sinfonía pastoral (1 June 1970)
- Diego Acevedo
  - La camarilla (1 January 1966)
- Tiempo y hora
  - Como en un desierto (6 February 1966)
- Tengo un libro en las manos
  - El acueducto (4 August 1966)
- Los Encuentros
  - Primavera en el parque (6 August 1966)
- Teatro de siempre
  - La verdad sospechosa (6 April 1967)
  - La salvaje (5 January 1970)
- La pequeña comedia
  - El ensayo (14 February 1968)
  - Petición de mano (31 May 1968)
- Pequeño estudio
  - Noche cerrada (8 November 1968)
- Al filo de imposible
  - El cielo abierto (20 June 1970)
- Hora once
  - De la misma sangre (20 May 1972)
- Que usted lo mate bien
  - El túnel (13 February 1979)
- Un encargo original
  - La maraña (20 August 1983)
- El jardín de Venus
  - Imprudencia (22 November 1983)
- Boa Tarde (TVG, 1985) – Presenter
- Tarde de teatro
  - Un paraguas bajo la lluvia (28 December 1986)
- La tarde
  - 7 September 1987
- El olivar de Atocha (1989)
- Brigada Central (1989)
  - Asuntos de Rutina
- Primera función
  - El landó de seis caballos (16 March 1989)
- Yo, una mujer (1996)
- Raquel busca su sitio (2000)
  - No es fácil ser Raquel
- Policías, en el corazón de la calle
  - Mi voluntad puede matarme (1 January 2002)
  - De un corazón llegué a un abismo (2 January 2003) – Journalist
- Hospital Central
  - Baño de sales (31 May 2005)
- El comisario
  - 13 puñaladas (13 January 2006)
  - Eva del principio al fin (17 January 2006)
- La familia Mata
  - 26 May 2008
- Yo soy Bea (2008–2009)
- Amar es para siempre (2016–2017, special guest 5th season; special recurring role 6th season)
