= Fernando Sánchez Polack =

Spanish actor (1920–1982)

- Born: 11 August 1920
- Died: 24 January 1982 (aged 61); Madrid, Spain
- Occupation: Actor
- Years active: 1959-1982

Fernando Sánchez Polack (11 August 1920 – 24 January 1982) was a Spanish actor. He appeared in more than 110 films and television shows from 1959 to 1982, mostly in supporting roles in Spaghetti Western films. He starred in the 1966 film La caza, which won the Silver Bear for Best Director at the 16th Berlin International Film Festival.

On 1 December 1981 he was hospitalized from a paraplegia at Residencia Sanitaria Provincial, and he died on 24 January 1982 aged 61 from cardiac arrest.

== Selected filmography ==
- Los tramposos (1959) - Ayudante truhán
- La fiel infantería (1960) - Sargento Asterio
- Los económicamente débiles (1960)
- Trío de damas (1960) - Horacio, un basurero
- Don Mendo's Revenche (1962) - Barón de Vedia
- The Balcony of the Moon (1962)
- Weeping for a Bandit (1964) - Antonio
- A Fistful of Dollars (1964) - Rojo Gang Member Crushed by Wine Cask (uncredited)
- I due violenti (1964) - Hombre de Barnes
- Los dinamiteros (1964) - Obrero en mausoleo
- Minnesota Clay (1964) - (uncredited)
- Búsqueme a esa chica (1964) - Mariano
- Jesse James' Kid (1965)
- The Art of Living (1965)
- Posición avanzada (1966) - Sargento Díaz
- With the East Wind (1966) - Francisco Vázquez
- Nuevo en esta plaza (1966) - Torero
- Nueve cartas a Berta (1966) - Padre Echarri
- La caza (1966) - Juan
- La busca (1966) - Tomás
- The Drums of Tabu (1966) - Anahita's Father (uncredited)
- The Ugly Ones (1966)
- The Big Gundown (1966) - Sheriff of Willow Creek City (uncredited)
- Django Does Not Forgive (1966)
- Ballad of a Gunman (1967) - Saloon Owner (uncredited)
- Bewitched Love (1967) - Padre de Candelas
- Crónica de nueve meses (1967) - Eugenio - conductor del autobús
- De cuerpo presente (1967) - Jefe de policía
- Novios 68 (1967) - Guardia urbano
- Club de solteros (1967) - Paco
- Peppermint Frappé (1967) - Patient (uncredited)
- Les têtes brûlées (1967)
- Los flamencos (1968)
- Los subdesarrollados (1968) - Jefe de bomberos
- La dinamita está servida (1968) - Pepe
- Stress-es tres-tres (1968) - Juan
- Long-Play (1968) - Jacinto
- Tiempos de Chicago (1969) - Rico
- Pagó cara su muerte (1969)
- Adiós cordera (1969) - Don Julián
- Blood in the Bullring (1969) - Félix
- Macabre (1969) - Comisario
- Los desafíos (1969) - Benito (segment 2)
- El ángel (1969) - Delincuente
- A Bullet for Sandoval (1969) - Mexican Officer (uncredited)
- Los escondites (1969)
- Homicidios en Chicago (1969)
- El niño y el potro (Más allá de río Miño) (1969) - Don Lorenzo - alcalde
- The Pizza Triangle (1970) - District Head of Communist Party
- Il trapianto (1970)
- La ley de una raza (1970)
- El bosque del lobo (1970) - Vilairo
- The Wind's Fierce (1970) - Pedro
- Las melancólicas (1971)
- 20,000 dólares por un cadáver (1971)
- Captain Apache (1971) - Guitarist
- The House of the Doves (1972) - Sirviente de Fernando
- La garbanza negra, que en paz descanse... (1972) - Bombero jefe
- The Cannibal Man (1972) - Señor Ambrosio
- Pancho Villa (1972) - Manuel
- El Retorno de Walpurgis (1973) - Maurice, Waldemar's valet
- The Guerrilla (1973) - Guerrillero
- La leyenda del alcalde de Zalamea (1973) - Alguacil
- Vengeance of the Zombies (1973) - Augusto
- Murder in a Blue World (1973) - Rehabilitado
- Verflucht dies Amerika (1973)
- The King is the Best Mayor (1974) - Yuntero
- Cuando los niños vienen de Marsella (1974) - Padre de Titi
- The Mummy's Revenge (1975) - Anchaff
- The Great House (1975)
- Pim, pam, pum... ¡fuego! (1975)
- Solo ante el Streaking (1975) - Servando
- El poder del deseo (1975) - Vecino
- Manuela (1976) - El Moreno
- La lozana andaluza (1976)
- Secuestro (1976) - Guardia civil
- Más fina que las gallinas (1977)
- Foul Play (1977) - Mecánico del pueblo
- ¡Bruja, más que bruja! (1977) - Sacerdote
- Me siento extraña (1977) - Tomás
- Los Días del pasado (1978) - Lucio
- Un hombre llamado Flor de Otoño (1978) - Modesto
- Donde hay patrón... (1978) - Vargas
- Cartas de amor de una monja (1978) - Jerónimo
- Cabo de vara (1978)
- Seven Days in January (1979) - Sebastián Cifuentes
- La Sabina (1979) - Félix
- El lobo negro (1981)
- Buitres sobre la ciudad (1981) - Cullen
- Perdóname, amor (1982)
