= Marisol (actress) =

Spanish singer and actress (born 1948)

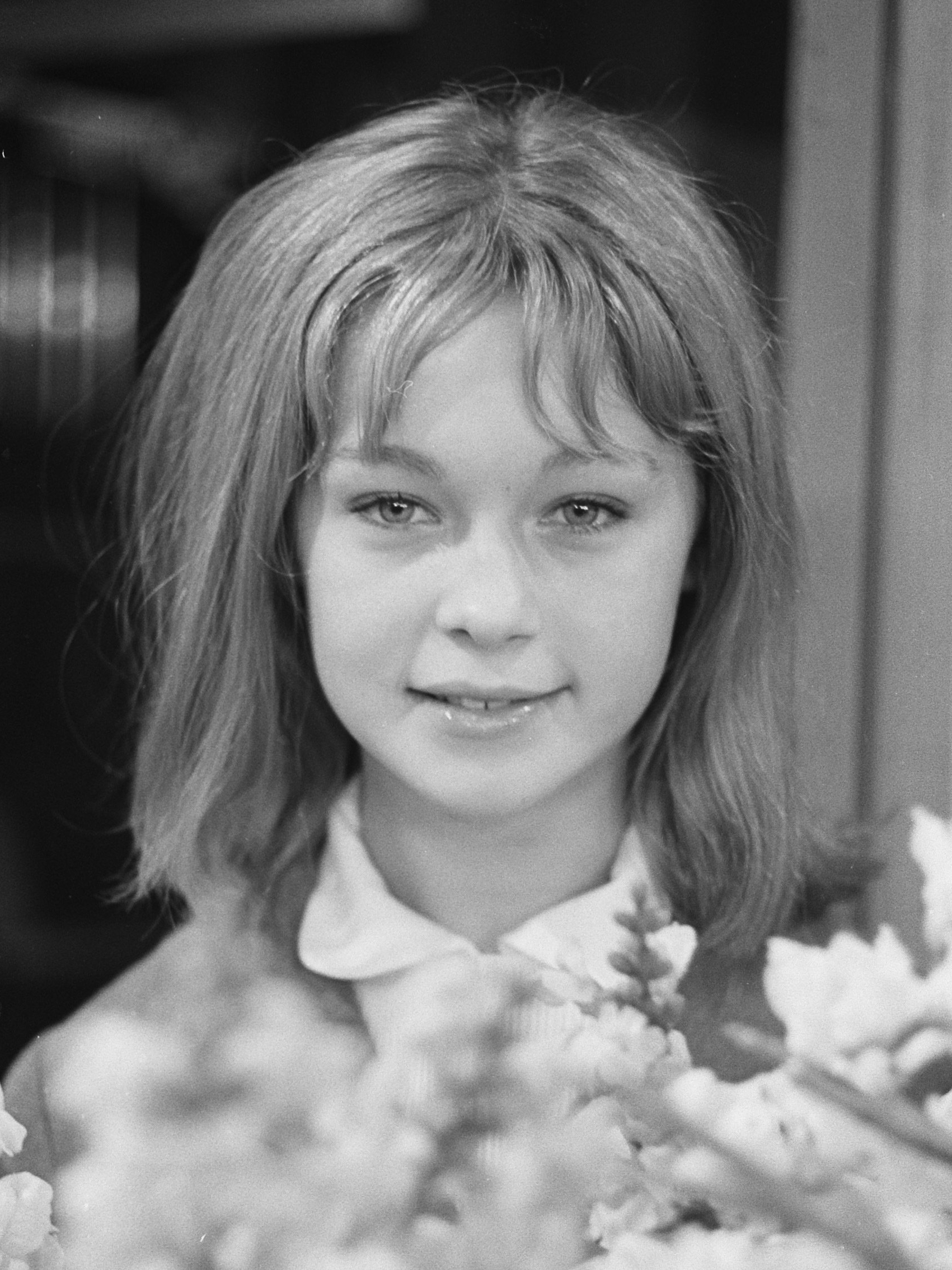
- Marisol in 1962
- Born: Josefa Flores González; 4 February 1948 (age 78); Málaga, Andalusia, Spain
- Other name: Pepa Flores
- Occupations: Singer, actress
- Years active: 1960–1985
- Notable work: A Ray of Light, Blood Wedding, Carmen
- Spouses: Carlos Goyanes (m. 1969; sep. 1972) Antonio Gades (m. 1982; div. 1986)
- Partner: Massimo Stecchini (since 1987)
- Children: 3, including María and Celia
- Parents: Juan Flores (father); María González (mother)
- Awards: Best Actress, Karlovy Vary International Film Festival (1978)

Josefa Flores González (born 4 February 1948), known professionally as Marisol or Pepa Flores, is a retired Spanish singer and actress who was an evolving icon in Spain since her first appearance in 1960 as a child star until her retreat from the spotlight in 1985.

== Early life ==
Marisol was born Josefa Flores González on 4 February 1948 in Málaga, Andalusia, Spain. From early childhood, she demonstrated a love of singing and flamenco dance, that was passed down to her by her grandmother, Victoria. The girl entered a choir and dance group named Los joselitos del cante belonging to the Sección Femenina's national organization Coros y Danzas.

In 1959, she was discovered by film producer Manuel Goyanes. One of her first televised performances with Los joselitos del cante was seen by his daughter Mari Carmen Goyanes, and she convinced her father that the girl she had seen on television was the actress and singer they needed. The producer convinced Pepa Flores's parents, and she ultimately signed an exclusive contract with him.

== Career ==
=== Early career ===
The career of Marisol, her artistic name, had just begun. She received dance, acting, and declamation classes taught by the best teachers, with the idea of making her the star of children's and youth cinema.

For her first film, A Ray of Light (directed by Luis Lucia, 1960), a huge merchandising campaign was organized around the new star, with books, dolls, cards, and all kinds of objects with the girl's image. Each film premiere included a tour of Spain and Hispanic countries to promote it, with all kinds of events creating tumults and crowds at the airports. Television appearances, interviews, and hundreds of photo shoots, in addition to the film shootings, prevented her from having a childhood like that of any other girl. Columbia Pictures wanted to buy the rights to Manuel Goyanes to continue exploiting her artistic career, but the producer rejected the proposal. Luis Lucia propelled her to national stardom in her two following films An Angel Has Arrived (1961) and Tómbola (1962).

She was extremely popular in Spain and Latin America.

=== As a singer ===
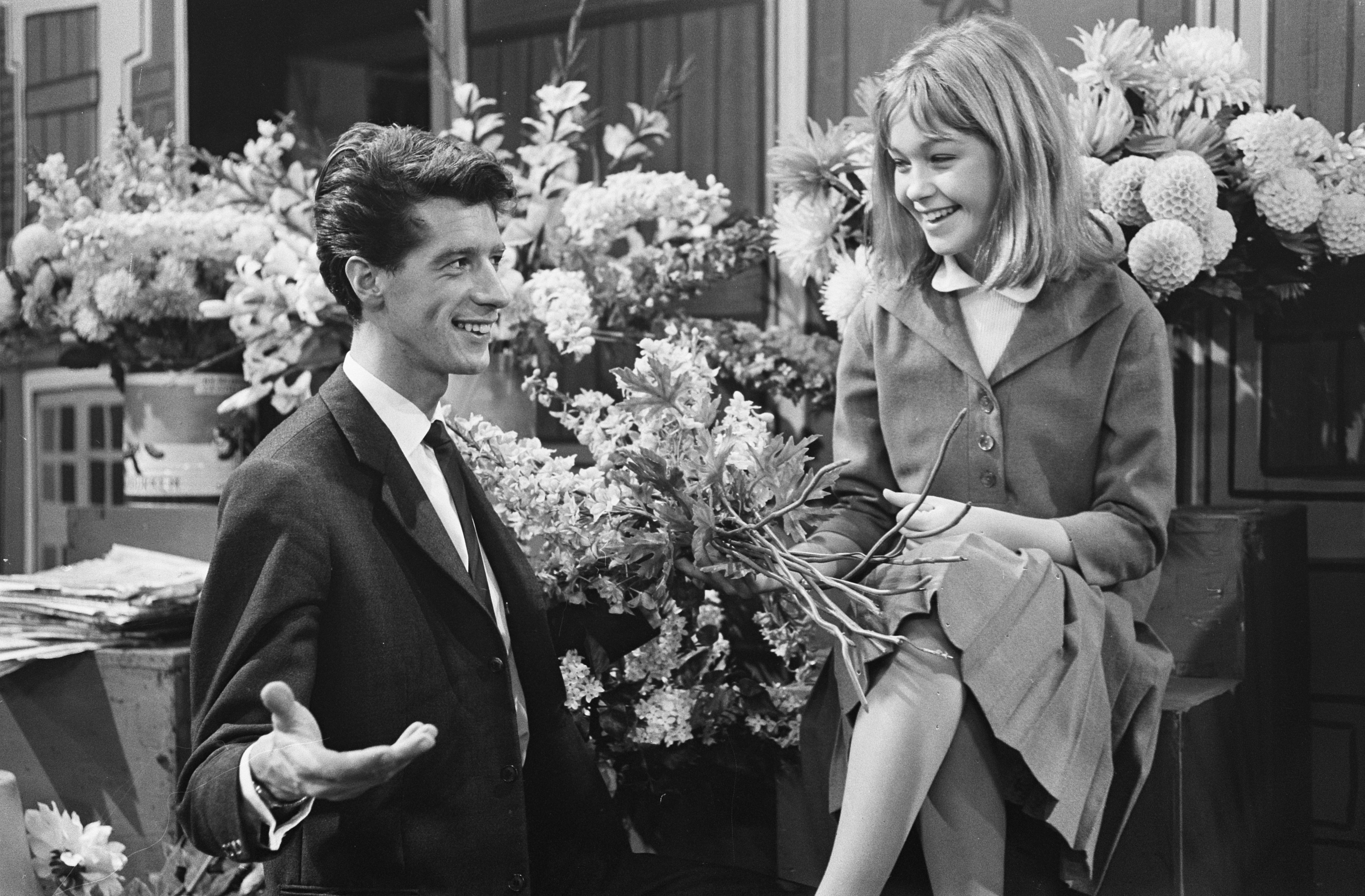
On the Dutch Rudy Carrell Show, 1962

She also established herself as a singer thanks to the songs she performed in her films. Some of her best-known songs from her first three films were "Tómbola", "Corre, corre caballito", "Bambina", "Ola, ola, ola", "Estando contigo", "Chiquitina", and "Nueva melodía".

In 1963 she starred in Marisol rumbo a Río, where she played twins (similar to Hayley Mills in The Parent Trap) and sang "Bossanova junto a ti", "Muchachita", "¡Oh, Tony!", and "Guajiras". Marisol co-starred with Robert Conrad the 1964 film La nueva Cenicienta, in which she sang "Me conformo". Mel Ferrer directed her in Cabriola in 1965, where she sang "Cabriola", "¡Ay, vagabundo, "Ya no me importas nada", and "Sevillanas". She appeared in the 1964 film Búsqueme a esa chica with Dúo Dinámico. The film had biographical elements, featuring Marisol singing "Mi pequeña estrella", "Typical Spanish", and "Solo a ti". She appeared in the 1964 film La historia de Bienvenido, a story about a donkey.

=== As an actress ===
In 1967, Marisol starred in the comedy Las cuatro bodas de Marisol, as the daughter of actress Isabel Garcés, and sang "La Boda", "Johnny", "Belen, Belen" (featuring Peret), and "La Tarara" (inspired by a García Lorca poem). She appeared in Solos los dos (1968), where she sang "La nieve" (her most popular song in South America, composed by Juan Pardo and Rocío Dúrcal's husband, Júnior). In 1969, she appeared in the unsuccessful Carola de día, Carola de noche and in the musical comedy El taxi de los conflictos, where she sang "Corazón contento", a song composed by Palito Ortega.

Marisol received the Best Actress Award at the Karlovy Vary International Film Festival for her role in Los días del pasado (1978). She also appeared in The Corruption of Chris Miller (1973), directed by Juan Antonio Bardem; The Girl from the Red Cabaret (1973) with Mel Ferrer, and El poder del deseo (1975) with Pilar Bardem.

As an adult, Marisol changed her stage name to her given name, Pepa Flores and appeared in Carlos Saura's Blood Wedding (based on García Lorca's play), and in Carmen (1983). She played the title role of Mariana Pineda in the Televisión Española (TVE) series Proceso a Mariana Pineda in 1984, and was applauded for her lead role in the 1985's Caso cerrado, one of the first films featuring Antonio Banderas.

Pablo Mérida and Paloma Blanco Aristín in their book El cine español credit Saura with succeeding to bring Marisol out of retirement/seclusion to star in Blood Wedding and Carmen. Then, Caso cerrado was advertised as her comeback feature, but after its failure she had to play "cat-and-mouse" with the media in San Sebastián where she stayed for three days. According to some, it was the movie's flop that led to her definitive retirement.

== Personal life and family ==
On 16 May 1969, Marisol married Carlos Goyanes Perojo, son of her producer. They separated in 1972.

In 1973, she started a relationship with dancer Antonio Gades, and she has three daughters with him. María Esteve, the eldest, is an actress, and Celia Flores, the youngest, is a pop flamenco singer. After her divorce from Goyanes, Flores and Gades married in 1982 in Cuba and their godparents were Fidel Castro and Alicia Alonso. They divorced on 1986, and Gades died in 2004. She was a sympathizer (but not a member) of the Spanish Communist Party, distancing herself from the party after her separation from Gades.

Pepa Flores is retired and lived with Massimo Stecchini, her partner from 1987 until his death in 2023, in Malaga, where she works for charitable causes.

In the wake of the Me Too movement, the claims Marisol made to Francisco Umbral and Interviú in the late 1970s about the sexual abuse she underwent as a child star resurfaced in Spanish Vanity Fair in 2018.

- Victoria (Grandmother)
  - Maria Gonzalez (Mother) – Juan Flores
    - Josefa Flores González (Marisol) – Antonio Gades
      - Maria Esteve (Daughter)
      - Celia Flores (Daughter)
      - Tamara Gades (Daughter)

== Filmography ==
=== Film ===
Year	Title	Role
1960	A Ray of Light	Marisol
1961	An Angel Has Arrived	Marisol
1962	Tómbola	Marisol
1963	Marisol rumbo a Río	Marisol / Mariluz
1964	La nueva Cenicienta	Marisol
1964	La historia de Bienvenido	Marisol
1964	Búsqueme a esa chica	Marisol
1965	Cabriola	Chica
1967	Las cuatro bodas de Marisol	Marisol
1968	Solos los dos	Marisol Collado
1969	Carola de día, Carola de noche	Carola Jungbunzlav
1969	El taxi de los conflictos	Marisol / Patricia
1969	Urtain, el rey de la selva... o así	
1973	The Corruption of Chris Miller	Chris Miller
1973	The Girl from the Red Cabaret	María Marcos
1975	El poder del deseo	Juna
1978	Los días del pasado	Juana
1981	Blood Wedding	
1983	Carmen	
1985	Caso cerrado	Isabel

=== Television ===
Date	Title	Role	Network	Notes
23 April 1961	The Ed Sullivan Show	Herself	CBS, United States	
24 June 1962	The Ed Sullivan Show	Herself	CBS, United States	
19 October 1962	De Rudi Carrell Show	Herself	VARA, Netherlands	
31 July 1965	Sábado 64	Herself		
2 October 1965	Noche del sábado	Herself		
9 October 1966	Gran Premio	Herself		
October 1968	Galas del sábado	Herself	Televisión Española, Spain	
17 May 1969	Galas del sábado	Herself	Televisión Española, Spain	
December 1969	Galas del sábado	Herself	Televisión Española, Spain	
1969	El Irreal Madrid		Televisión Española, Spain	
7 June 1970	Galas del sábado	Herself	Televisión Española, Spain	
1972	360 grados en torno a...	Herself	Televisión Española, Spain	
25 November 1972	1st OTI Song Contest	Herself	OTI	Representing Televisión Española and placing 3rd with the song Niña
Nov/Dec 1984	Proceso a Mariana Pineda	Mariana Pineda	Televisión Española, Spain	5 episodes, credited as Pepa Flores

== Awards ==
- 1960 – Prize of the National Syndicate of Spectacle, Spain (Sindicato Nacional del Espectáculo): ″Special Mention″ for her performance in A Ray of Light.
- 1972 – 3rd position OTI Festival prize for her song "Niña".
- 1978 – Best Actress Award at the Karlovy Vary International Film Festival for the film Los días del pasado directed by Mario Camus.
- 2020 – Honorary Goya Award

Preceded by none	Spain in the OTI Festival; 1972	Succeeded by Camilo Sesto with "Algo más"
