= Isabel Garcés =

Spanish actress (1901–1981)

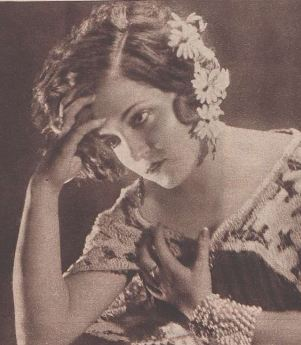
- Garcés in 1931
- Born: Isabel Garcés Cerezal; 28 January 1901; Madrid, Spain
- Died: 3 February 1981 (aged 80); Madrid, Spain
- Occupation: Actress
- Years active: 1959-1975 (film)

Isabel Garcés Cerezal (28 January 1901 – 3 February 1981) was a Spanish stage and film actress.

She is particularly remembered for being a regular sidekick (a grandmother or mother figure) in Marisol's movies: An Angel Has Arrived (1961), Marisol rumbo a Río (1963), Búsqueme a esa chica (1965), Las cuatro bodas de Marisol (1967), Solos los dos (1968).

== Biography ==
Isabel Garcés was born in Madrid in 1891. At only five years of age, she started performing at the Madrilenian Teatro del Príncipe as part of the children's troupe led by Jacinto Benavente.

Later, Tirso Escudero booked her into his Teatro de la Comedia. Her first role there was as the "ugly woman" in El orgullo de la Albacete, a play in three acts by French playwright Pierre Veber.

Her next theatre was Eslava, where she moved together with Catalina Bárcena and Gregorio Martinez Sierra. In that theatre, she notably was Pepita Morer's substitute in Las lágrimas de la Trini by playwright Carlos Arniches.

After that, she moved to the Teatro Infanta Isabel and became part of its troupe led by Arturo Serrano. She stayed with the theatre for twenty seasons, notably beating the record of 200 performances in 40 comedy plays. At that theatre, she was part of the original casts of such plays as Pedro Muñoz's El refugio, El alfiler and La tonta del rizo, Adolfo Torrado's El famoso Carballeira, Chiruca and Mosquita en palacio and Jacinto Benavente's Su amante esposa, El alfiler en la boca, El marido de bronce and Ha llegado Don Juan.

She appeared in her first film at the age of 58. Her roles were that of typical sweet, absent-minded grandmother. In particular, she starred in many musical "child prodigy" comedies, playing a humorous counterpoint to child protagonists such as Marisol and Pili and Mili.

She died in Madrid on 3 February 1981, at the age of 80.

== Selected filmography ==
Year	Title	Role
1959	Una gran señora	
1960	My Last Tango	Clarisa
1961	An Angel Has Arrived	Herminia
1961	My Wedding Night	Gabriela
1963	The Daughters of Helena	Doña Helena
1963	Marisol rumbo a Río	
1963	Como dos gotas de agua	Ángela Goñi
1965	Búsqueme a esa chica	
1967	Las cuatro bodas de Marisol	
1968	Solos los dos	
1968	Cristina Guzmán	Mónica
1969	El taxi de los conflictos	
1970	Growing Leg, Diminishing Skirt	Doña Ramona
1971	The Rebellious Novice	Sister Estefanía
1975	Como matar a papá... sin hacerle daño	
1975	Una abuelita de antes de la guerra	
1975	Las bodas de Blanca	

== Bibliography ==
- Bentley, Bernard. A Companion to Spanish Cinema. Boydell & Brewer, 2008.
