= Juan Pardo =

Juan Pardo may refer to:

- Juan Pardo (explorer), 16th-century Spanish explorer and conquistador
- Juan Pardo de Tavera (1472–1545), Spanish cardinal and Grand Inquisitor
- Juan Pardo (singer) (born 1942), Spanish singer and songwriter
