= Juan y Junior =

Spanish musical duo

Juan y Junior (Juan & Junior)
- Origin: Madrid, Spain
- Genres: Pop
- Years active: 1967–1969
- Label: Novola
- Past members: Juan Pardo; Antonio Morales "Junior"

Juan y Junior was a Spanish musical duo that was active between 1967 and 1969. Its members were the Spanish Juan Pardo (born in 1942) and the Filipino Antonio Morales "Junior" (1943–2014).

== History ==
Juan y Junior began their careers first as part of the band "Los Pekenikes" and later as part of "Los Brincos" in the 1960s. In February 1967, they formed the duo "Juan y Junior". In 1968 the duo was given the task of composing the entire soundtrack and musical themes for the film Solos los dos, directed by Luis Lucia Mingarro and starring Marisol and Palomo Linares .

Although the band's discography was short, having only 8 singles and one eponymous album, two of their songs reached No. 1 on the Spanish charts. The band parted ways in 1969 with each artist continuing as solo artists, as well as Junior's work as a producer.

Junior would marry Rocío Dúrcal, having three children together before his death in April 2014.

On September 2, 2020, the band's music was featured on the shortwave radio service of Radio Exterior de España (REE).

== Chart performance ==
Juan y Junior Chart Performance
Year	Weeks at #1 on the Spanish charts	Song title
1967	4	La Caza
1967	1	Nos falta fe

== Discography ==
=== Albums ===
- Juan y Junior (1969).

=== Singles ===
- La Caza / Nada (Novola, 1967)
- A Dos Niñas / Tres Días (Novola, 1967)
- Nos Falta Fe / Bajo El Sol (Novola, 1967)
- Departamento De Radio (Novola, 1967)
- Anduriña / Para Verte Reír (Novola, 1968)
- Tiempo De Amor / En San Juan (Novola, 1968)
- Anduriña / To Girls (Zafiro, 1968)
- Lo Que El Viento Se Llevó / Tus Ojos (Novola, 1969)

== Filmography ==
- En un mundo diferent, directed by Pedro Olea
