= The Ugly Ones =

1966 film

- US film poster
- Directed by: Eugenio Martín
- Screenplay by: James Donald Prindle; José Gutiérrez Maesso; Eugenio Martín
- Based on: The Bounty Killer by Marvin H. Albert
- Produced by: José Gutiérrez Maesso; Lilian Biancini
- Starring: Richard Wyler; Tomas Milian; Ella Karin; Mario Brega
- Cinematography: Enzo Barboni
- Edited by: José Antonio Rojo; Gisa Radicchi Levi
- Music by: Stelvio Cipriani
- Production companies: Tescia; Discobolo Film
- Distributed by: Vincit Films (Spain); Discobolo Film (Italy); United Artists (US)
- Release dates: 4 November 1966 (Italy); 17 April 1967 (Spain)
- Running time: 95 minutes
- Countries: Spain; Italy

The Ugly Ones (es: El precio de un hombre, lit. "The Price of a Man", it: The Bounty Killer, later La morte ti segue... ma non ha fretta, lit. "Death follows you... but not in a hurry") is a 1966 Spanish-Italian spaghetti Western film directed by Eugenio Martín.

The film marked the debut of Tomas Milian in the western genre and was the first film score of composer Stelvio Cipriani. It was also the first Spanish western to receive a state funding for the "artistic interest of the work". The film was based on the 1958 novel The Bounty Killer by Marvin H. Albert.

It was shown as part of a retrospective on Spaghetti Western at the 64th Venice International Film Festival. On October 11, 2017 Eugenio Martín was honored for the fiftieth anniversary of this at the 7º Almería Western Film Festival.

== Plot ==
The notorious bounty hunter, Luke Chilson, pursues Mexican fugitive Jose Gomez. He follows him through the desert and arrives in a Mexican village where Gomez manages to turn the peasants against his pursuer. Unaware of the danger, Chilson finds himself trapped.

== Cast ==
- Richard Wyler as Luke Chilson
- Tomas Milian as José Gómez
- Ella Karin as Eden
- Mario Brega as Miguel
- Glenn Foster as Novak
- Hugo Blanco
- Luis Barboo
- Lola Gaos as Ruth Harman
- Ricardo Canales as Joe Harmon
- Manuel Zarzo as Marty Hefner
- Tito García as Zacarías
- Antonio Iranzo as Antonio
- Fernando Sánchez Polack as Doc, Gomez henchman
- Saturno Cerra as Gomez Henchman
- Augusto Pesarini as Gomez Henchman
- José Canalejas as Juan Valdez
- Goyo Lebrero as Cajero
- Enrique Navarro as Manuel, wagon driver
- Rafael Vaquero as the sheriff of Bisbee
- Gonzalo Esquiroz as Bill, the shotgun messenger
- Ricardo Palacios as the waystation attendant
- Antonio Cintado as Max, the escort guard
- Chiro Bermejo as Dade, the hed escort guard
- Frank Braña as Wade Dempsey
- Gene Collins as a gang member
