= A Ray of Light =

- Directed by: Luis Lucia
- Written by: Félix Atalaya; Manuel Atlaya
- Produced by: Manuel Goyanes; Benito Perojo
- Starring: Marisol; María Mahor; Joaquín Roa; María Isbert; José S. Isbert; María José Goyanes; Mercedes Borqué; Anselmo Duarte
- Cinematography: Manuel Berenguer
- Edited by: José Antonio Rojo
- Music by: Gregorio García Segura
- Release date: 1960
- Country: Spain
- Language: Spanish

A Ray of Light (Spanish: Un rayo de luz) is a 1960 Spanish musical film directed by Luis Lucia. It was the first movie to star singer and actress Marisol, and it skyrocketed her to fame. Marisol won the award for Best Child Actress at the Venice Film Festival for her performance.

The film is generally thought to form a trilogy with Marisol's two next movies, An Angel Has Arrived (1961) and Tómbola (1962).

== Cast ==
- Marisol
- María Mahor
- Joaquín Roa
- María Isbert
- José S. Isbert
- María José Goyanes
- Mercedes Borqué
- Anselmo Duarte

== Music ==
- "Santa Lucia" – Marisol
- "Llorando y mirando al cielo" – Marisol
- "Adiós al colegio" – Marisol
- "Canciones" – Marisol
- "Verdiales" – Marisol
- "Nana italiana" – Marisol
- "Corre, corre, caballito" – Marisol
- "Paso firme" – Marisol
- "El currucucú" – by Marisol
- "Dos estrellas" – by Marisol
- "Rubita" – Dolores Pérez a.k.a. Lily Berchman
- "El baile" – Performer unknown
- Title unknown – Rafaela de Córdoba

== Soundtrack ==
Marisol en Un rayo de luz

Soundtrack album by Marisol
- Released: 1960

Marisol chronology
| Marisol en Un rayo de luz (1960) | Ha llegado un ángel (1961) |

Professional ratings
Review scores
| Source | Rating |
|---|---|
| Billboard | 3/4 stars |

The original soundtrack to the 1960 film A Ray of Light was released by Montilla Records user the title Marisol en Un rayo de luz (lit. 'Marisol in A Ray of Light').

U. S. Billboard reviewed the soundtrack in its issue from 29 May 1961, writing: "[Marisol] displays remarkable versatility in her role, ranging from pop to operatic style arrangements. [...] Recording is excellent" and classifying it under "Moderate sales potential" (3 out of 4 stars).
