= Mariana Pineda =

Spanish liberalist

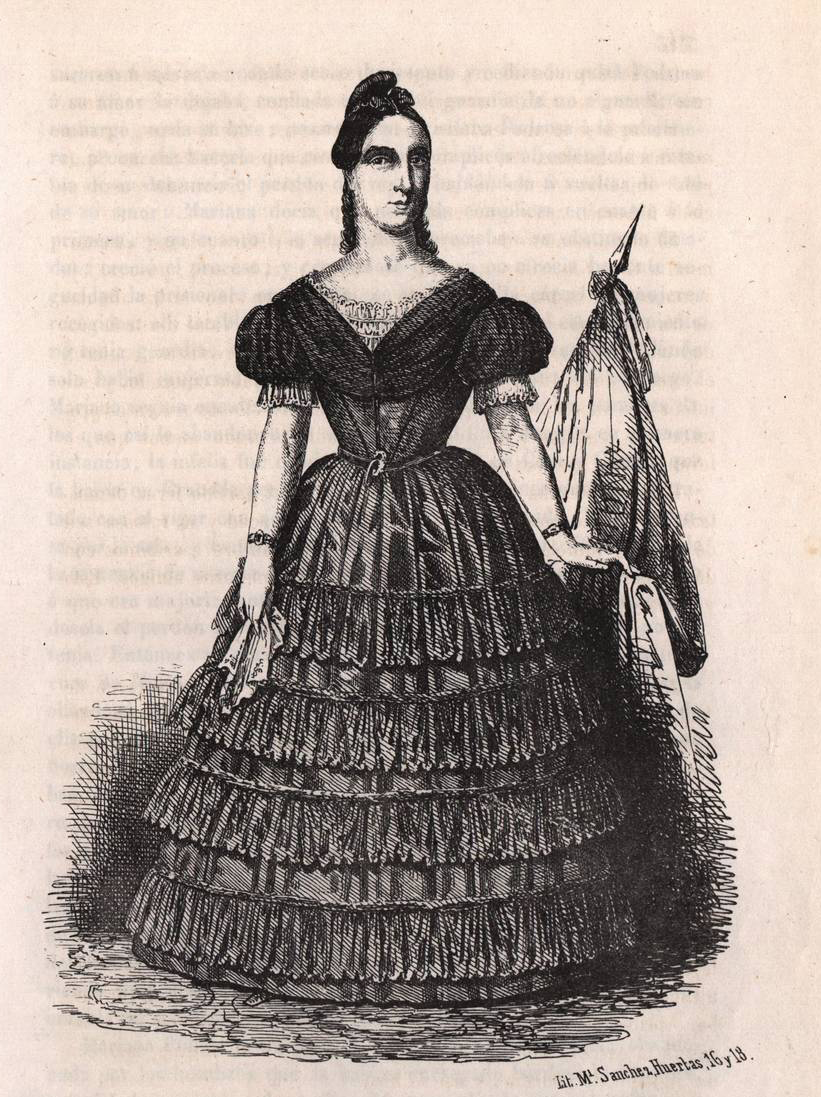
- Pineda in History of the National Militia, from its creation to modern-day (1855)
- Born: Mariana de Pineda y Muñoz; September 1, 1804; Granada, Spain
- Died: May 26, 1831 (aged 26); Granada, Spain
- Cause of death: Execution by garrote
- Burial place: Granada Cathedral

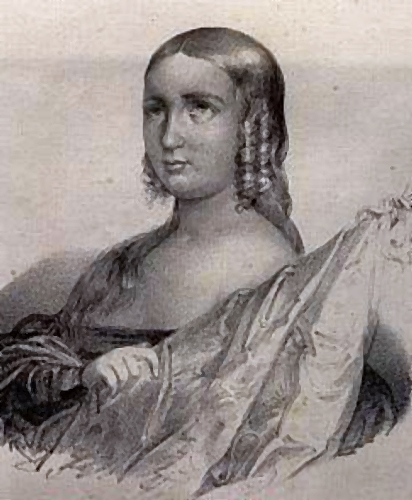
Portrait of Mariana Pineda, holding the flag

Mariana de Pineda y Muñoz, generally known as Mariana Pineda, (1 September 1804 in Granada – 26 May 1831 in Granada) was a Spanish liberal heroine. May 26th, the anniversary of her execution, is a local holiday in the city of Granada.

== Biography ==
Mariana Pineda was the daughter of Mariano de Pineda y Ramírez, a Granadan ship captain and knight of the Order of Calatrava, and María de los Dolores Muñoz y Bueno, from Lucena, who was much younger and of lower social status. For unknown reasons, the couple were never married, but lived for a time in Seville, where they had a daughter who died shortly after birth. After moving to Granada, where they lived in separate houses, they had a second daughter, Mariana. Mother and daughter moved into Mariano Pineda's residence for a time, until Pineda denounced María Dolores and the two fled. On 12 November 1805, María Dolores was arrested and forced to return her daughter Mariana into the custody of her father.

After Pineda's death, Mariana Pineda passed into the custody of one of his brothers, and subsequently into that of José de Mesa and Úrsula de la Press, young dependents of her uncle, under whose charge she remained for most of her childhood.

In October 1819, a fifteen-year-old Mariana married Manuel Peralta Valte, a liberal army officer eleven years her senior. Five months later she gave birth to a son, José María, and the following year to a daughter, Úrsula María. In August 1822, her husband died, leaving her an eighteen-year-old widow with two young children.

It was apparently during those three years of her marriage, which coincide with the Trienio Liberal, that Mariana joined the liberal cause, and after the restoration of absolutism under Ferdinand VII in 1823, she welcomed persecuted liberals into her home. In those circles she met a military man with a sterling record, Casimiro Brodett y Carbone. The couple wished to marry, but were unable to, as Brodett was denied military dispensation due to his liberal affiliation and was forced to leave the army and Spain for Cuba. For the following two years, Mariana left Granada, and there is no record of what she was doing or where.

After her return to Granada, in 1828 Mariana assisted in Captain Fernando Álvarez de Sotomayor's escape from prison by sneaking friar's robes to disguise him. Fernando was a noted liberal who had been condemned to death for taking part in General Rafael Riego's insurrection, and also Mariana's cousin.

In a search of her house in 1831, a flag was discovered with the embroidered slogan "Equality, Freedom and Law" and Mariana was arrested and accused of conspiracy. After a failed escape attempt, she was detained in the Santa María Egipciaca convent in Granada. During the trial, the judge tried to persuade her to betray her accomplices in exchange for leniency, but she refused. Mariana was publicly executed by the garrote on 26 May. Her flag was burned in front of her.

In 1856, Pineda was finally reinterred in Granada Cathedral, where her remains lie under a simple tombstone with the following epitaph:

† D.O.M. Ad perpetuam memoriam. Reliquiæ mortales Marianæ a Pineda, quam, sæva morte, percussit tyrannus, Granatæ septimo kalendas junii, anni millesimi octogentesimi trigesimi primi. Requiescat in pace. Patria grata ejus memoriam colit. Anno M.DCCCLVI. (Translation: † To God, the Best and Greatest. For perpetual memory. The mortal remains of Mariana de Pineda, whom a tyrant struck down with a cruel death in Granada on the seventh day before the calends of June [May 26], in the year 1831. May she rest in peace. A grateful homeland honors her memory. In the year 1856.)

== Legacy ==
In 1862 both Juan Antonio Vero Calvo and Isidoro Lozano produced oil paintings of Pineda's final walk to the scaffold (Prado collection).

In 1925 the playwright Federico García Lorca based his play Mariana Pineda on her story, propelling the popular heroine into legend and myth. Between 1965 and 1969 the French composer Louis Saguer (1907–1991) composed an opera on the subject. The work premiered in 1970 in Marseille and was awarded the Grand Opera Prize of Monaco (1970).

Another Spanish playwright, José Martín Recuerda, a native of Granada, wrote "Las arrecogías del Beaterio de Santa María Egipciaca" based on the imprisonment of Mariana Pineda. The play was adapted and translated into English by Robert Lima as "The Inmates of the Convent of St. Mary Egyptian" and premiered on 17 March 1980 with a professional cast at Pennsylvania State University. After its inclusion in DramaContemporary: Spain (1985), edited by Marion Peter Holt, Martín Recuerda's play was performed at the Edinburgh Festival Fringe by the Oxford Theatre Group in 1988.

A 1984 mini-series (5 episodes) was produced by Spanish TV, entitled Proceso a Mariana Pineda, and starring Pepa Flores as Pineda. An English summary of this was made by Patrick Louis Cooney of the Vernon Johns Society (qv).

A hall inside the Seat of the European Parliament in Strasbourg bears her name.
