= Rafael Peralta (rejoneador) =

Spanish rejoneador (1933–2025)

- Born: Rafael Peralta Pineda; 4 June 1933; La Puebla del Río, Spain
- Died: 4 July 2025 (aged 92); Seville, Spain
- Occupation: Rejoneador
- Relatives: Ángel Peralta Pineda (brother)

Rafael Peralta Pineda (Spanish: [rafaˈel peˈɾalta piˈneða]; 4 June 1933 – 4 July 2025) was a Spanish rejoneador.

== Biography ==
Born in La Puebla del Río on 4 June 1933, Peralta made his debut in bullfighting in Madrid on 30 May 1959. His debut was in the presence of Julio Aparicio Martínez, Manolo Vázquez, and Curro Girón. In 1966, his horse was gored at the Maestranza in Seville, which led to a four-year hiatus from bullfighting. In 1972, he was convicted of assaulting a journalist over a dispute regarding criticisms by the journalist. After 1995, he went on to participate in approximately 20 bullfights.

Rafael Peralta died in Seville on 4 July 2025, at the age of 92.
