= Marisol rumbo a Río =

- Directed by: Fernando Palacios
- Written by: José María Palacio; Alfonso Paso
- Produced by: Manuel Goyanes
- Starring: Marisol; Isabel Garcés; José Marco Davó; Gisia Paradis; Fernando Cebrián; Jöelle Rivero; George Rigaud; José Thelman
- Music by: Augusto Algueró; Antonio Guijarro
- Release date: 1963
- Country: Spain

Marisol rumbo a Río is a 1963 Spanish musical film. It was the fourth movie to star child singer and actress Marisol and it is considered the beginning of her transitional/adolescent stage.

== Plot ==
Marisol and her mother travel to Rio de Janeiro, Brazil, with the intent to reunite with Marisol's twin sister Mariluz and take her back to Spain with them.

== Music ==
- "Pide"
- "Muchachita"
- "Guajiras"
- "Bossa nova junto a ti"
- "Tony"
- "Sueño de Marisol"
- "Vistas de Río"
- "Créditos"
- "Corcovado"
