= Solos los dos =

- Directed by: Luis Lucia
- Written by: Jaime de Armiñán, Francisco Hueva Lastras; Luis Lucia (screen treatment)
- Produced by: Manuel J. Goyanes
- Music by: Juan y Junior
- Release date: 1968
- Running time: 91 min
- Country: Spain
- Language: Spanish

Solos los dos (lit. 'Only you and me', 'Just the two of us') is a 1968 Spanish musical film starring Marisol and bullfighter Sebastián Palomo Linares. The film was written by Jaime de Armiñán and Francisco Hueva Lastras and directed by Luis Lucia.

== Plot ==
Thriving 20-year-old bullfighter Sebastián Palomo Linares is driving fast along a mountain road when an even faster car overtakes him. They race each other and even have a fight when he learns that the other driver is a girl. A spark flies between them, but she drives away.

Marisol plays a rich 18-year-old girl with a passion for singing.

The music and songs for the soundtrack are provided by Juan y Junior.

== Cast ==
- Marisol as Marisol Collado
- Sebastián Palomo Linares as Sebastián Palomo Linares
- Isabel Garcés as Isabel
- José Orjas
- Pilar Gómez Ferrer
- Maria Álvarez
- Mercedes Borqué
- Emilio Alonso
- Conchita Montes

== Songs ==
- "Mi carretera"
- "Dos unidos"
- "Yo no quiero ser torero"
- "La nieve y yo"
- "Tic Tac"
