= El 13–13 =

- Theatrical release poster
- Directed by: Luis Lucia
- Cinematography: Willy Goldberger
- Edited by: Juan Pallejá
- Release date: 1943
- Running time: 71 minute
- Country: Spain
- Language: Spanish

El 13–13 is a 1943 Spanish comedy-drama film directed by Luis Lucia on his directing debut.

== Cast ==
- Rafael Durán
- Ramón Martori
- Alberto Romea
- Marta Santaolalla
