= La historia de Bienvenido =

- Directed by: Augusto Fenollar
- Written by: Augusto Fenollar (script); José María Sánchez Silva (story)
- Starring: Marisol; Boliche (Manuel Bermúdez); Jesús Guzmán
- Cinematography: Eduardo Noé
- Edited by: José Luis Matesanz
- Release date: 1964
- Running time: 60 minutes
- Country: Spain
- Language: Spanish

La historia de Bienvenido ("Bienvenido's Story") is a 1964 Spanish children's movie. It stars Marisol.

== Synopsys ==
Famous young star Marisol comes to a children's hospital to entertain the children and tells them a story about the life of a little donkey named Bienvenido who was separated from his mother, left to look for her and went through many difficulties and hardships.

== Songs ==
- Bienvenido (music by Antonio Moya, lyrics by Sánchez Silva) sung by Marisol

== Cast ==
- Marisol
- Boliche (Manuel Bermúdez)
- Jesús Guzmán
- Anabel Pintado
- Mari Carmen
- Augusto
- Valentín Tornos
- Miguel Armario
- Antonio Braña
- José María Labernié
- Milagros Guijarro
