= Júnior (Filipino singer) =

Filipino singer (1943–2014)

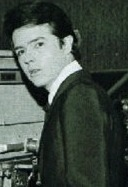
- Júnior, c. 1964
- Born: Antonio Morales y Barretto; 10 September 1943; Manila, Philippine Commonwealth
- Died: 15 April 2014 (aged 70); Torrelodones, Spain
- Occupations: Singer, actor
- Years active: 1958–1979
- Spouse: Rocío Dúrcal (m. 1970; died 2006)
- Children: 3, including Shaila Dúrcal
- Relatives: Gretchen Barretto (niece); Claudine Barretto (niece); Marjorie Barretto (niece); Julia Barretto (great-niece)

Antonio Morales Barretto (Tagalog pronunciation: [baˈrɛto]; 10 September 1943 – 15 April 2014), known professionally as Júnior, was a Filipino-born Spanish singer and actor.

== Early life ==
Morales was born in Manila, Philippines, to a Spanish father Antonio Morales Majó and a Filipina mother Carmen Barretto Valdés, the eldest of five brothers. He was born during the Japanese occupation of the Philippines, and at 15 years old his family emigrated to Barcelona, Spain, eventually settling in Madrid.

== Career ==
In 1958, he became part of the group Jump, a pioneering Spanish electric guitar group. During the group's popularity, he was featured in the film Me Enveneno De Azules in 1969. Some of his first hits included Todo Porque Te Quiero ("It's All Because I Love You") in 1969 and Perdóname (Excuse Me) in 1973.

He went on to join Los Brincos with Juan Pardo, and his brothers Miguel and Ricky Morales would also later join the group. Morales and Juan Pardo eventually left the group to release music as Juan y Junior. One of their songs is a Spanish version of "Fool on the Hill" by John Lennon and Paul McCartney from the LP titled Junior in 1976.

== Movie career ==
In the 1980s, he starred in the Philippine films Good Morning Sunshine with Vilma Santos, and Disco Madhouse, and released three albums in Tagalog for the Philippines. One of his most popular songs that he wrote and produced was "Yakap" (1979). That song, which he sang in his movie with Santos, became his signature song in the Philippines. Other hit songs of his are "Excuse Me" (1974) and "But If You Leave Me" (1976).

== Personal life ==
Morales married his wife Rocío Dúrcal in 1970, and their first child, Spanish actress Carmen Morales de las Heras, was born in December 1970. After the birth of their second child, Antonio Morales de las Heras, in April 1974, Morales decided to give up his career to devote time to their children. Dúrcal meanwhile continued her film and singing career. In 1979 they had their third child, Shaila Morales de las Heras, who took up a singing career under the stage name of Shaila Dúrcal. Morales also managed Dúrcal for much of her career.

Morales remained married to Dúrcal until her death in 2006. Her children became involved in controversial court battles over her inheritance, eventually reconciled after Carmen's wedding.

On 22 November 2007, his father, Antonio Morales Majó (born 1916), died of anemia, aged 91. His mother, Carmen Barretto Valdés (born 1914), died in 2012, aged 97.

He is the uncle of Philippine actresses Gretchen Barretto, Claudine Barretto and Marjorie Barretto.

== Death ==
Júnior died on 15 April 2014 in Torrelodones, Spain. He was cremated and his ashes were buried at Basilica de Guadalupe in Mexico City.

== Discography ==
=== Singles ===
- "Yakap"
- "But If You Leave Me"
- "Excuse Me"
- ”It’s Only Love”
