= Louis Saguer =

French-German composer (1907-1991)

Louis Saguer, born Wolfgang Simoni, (26 March 1907 – 1 March 1991) was a composer of German origin who became a naturalized French citizen in 1947.

== Life ==
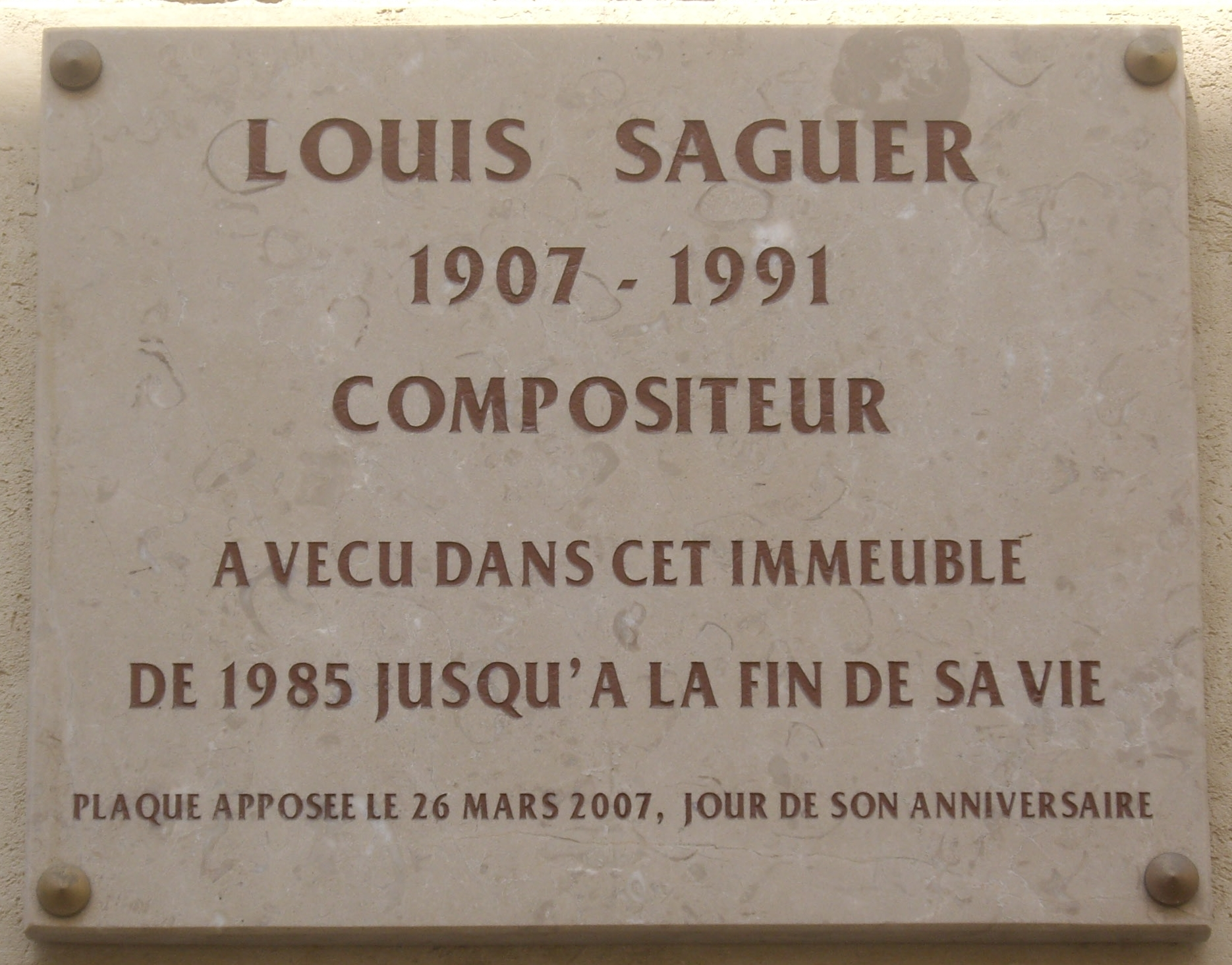
Memorial plaque, 8 rue Du Cange, Paris 14th arrondissement

Simoni was born in Berlin-Charlottenburg. After studying piano, composition and conducting at the Stern Conservatory in Berlin, he became Edmund Meisel's collaborator for the music of several films (Sergei Eisenstein's Battleship Potemkin, October: Ten Days That Shook the World, Arnold Fanck's The Holy Mountain).

Head of singing, assistant director and choreographer at the Berlin State Opera, conductor and assistant director at the Piscator Theatre, he continued his orchestration training work in 1929 in Paris where he settled permanently a few years later. After a difficult start, he became conductor of the Chorale populaire de Paris, close to the Communist Party. He composed songs and occasional works.

Saguer died in 1991 in Paris at the age of 83.

== Music for film ==
- 1959: Le Signe du lion by Éric Rohmer

== Awards ==
- 1961: Copley Award in Chicago
- 1964: Grand Prix de Monaco for his opera Mariana Pineda inspired by the tragic fate of the eponymous heroine.
- 1973: First Prize of the National Association of Negro Musicians for Daybreak in Alabama
- 1974: Prix de la SACEM

== Bibliography ==
- Louis Saguer and Raymond Lyon, Les Contes d'Hoffmann – Étude et analyse, Editions Mellottée, 1948
