= José Manuel Capuletti =

Spanish painter

José Manuel Capuletti (March 21, 1925 in Valladolid, Spain — 1978) was a Spanish painter whose work was strongly influenced by surrealism. His work has been collected by among others the Duke and Duchess of Windsor, Arthur Rubenstein, Charles Boyer, and Juan Carlos the former King of Spain. The Russian-American writer Ayn Rand was an admirer of his work.

Capuletti maintained a studio in Paris and exhibited with the Hammer galleries in New York City. His model and muse was often his wife, Pilar. With the Spanish bullfighter Ángel Peralta Pineda Capuletti created the book Caballo torero which was published in 1971. Capuletti also worked as set and costume designer for the dance recitals including for the José Greco company.
