= La nueva Cenicienta =

- Directed by: George Sherman
- Written by: Matthew Andrews, Alfonso Paso, Arturo Rigel
- Produced by: Manuel Goyanes
- Release date: 1964
- Country: Spain
- Languages: English, Spanish

La nueva Cenicienta (lit. 'New Cinderella') is a 1964 Spanish musical comedy film starring Marisol, Spanish flamenco dancer Antonio and American actor and singer Robert Conrad. In this film, Antonio demonstrates his dancing talents, and Marisol and Robert Conrad sing.

Partially in English, the film was written by Matthew Andrews, Alfonso Paso and Arturo Rigel and directed by American film director George Sherman.

== Cast ==
- Marisol
- Antonio
- Robert Conrad
