= Ángel Peralta Pineda =

Spanish rejoneador (1926–2018)

Ángel Peralta
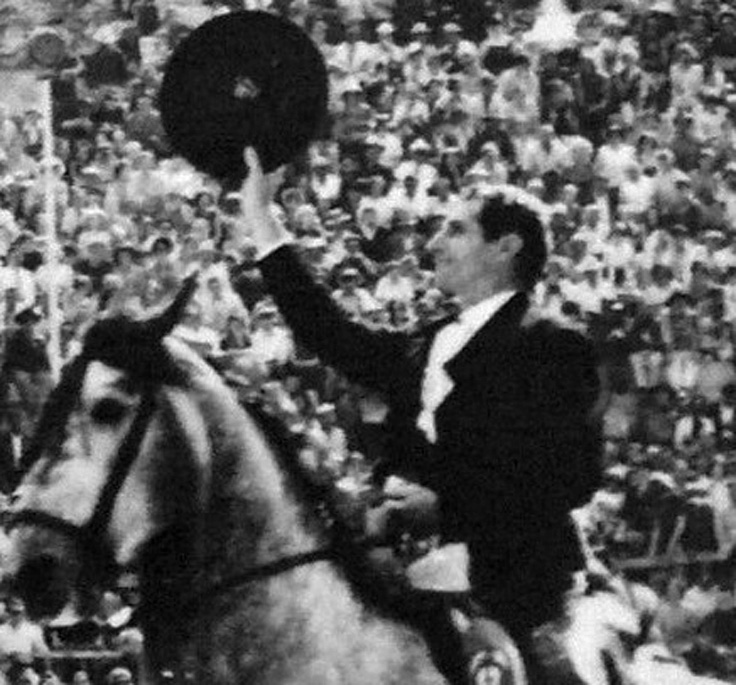
- Pineda in 1986
- Born: 18 March 1926; La Puebla del Río, Province of Seville, Spain
- Died: 7 April 2018 (aged 92); La Puebla del Río, Spain
- Occupation: Rejoneador
- Relatives: Rafael Peralta Pineda (brother)

Ángel Peralta Pineda, known as Centauro de las Marismas (18 March 1926 – 7 April 2018), was a Spanish rejoneador.

== Career ==
His public debut was in the Plaza de La Pañoleta (Seville) in 1945 and in Las Ventas in 1948 with a bull of Molero, accompanied by the shortlist of bullfighters Morenito de Talavera Chico, Rafael Yagüe and Antonio Chaves Flores. In 1954, he filmed alongside the rejoneador Bernardino Landete in scenes from the film La Princesa de Éboli (That Lady) by Terence Young and Cabriola in 1960, by Mel Ferrer.

In the 1960s, he used to lead the ranks of knights in the square. In the 1972 season, he began to form a team with his brother Rafael Peralta and Manuel Vidrié to perform a complete rejoneo show. In the fair of April of Seville of 1979, he made a performance in the La Maestranza, obtaining an important triumph.

He continued acting in the 1980s, fighting a few more years of seventy corridas. He was considered one of the best rejoneadores ever. He was awarded the Gold Medal of Merit in the Fine Arts in 2013 by the Ministry of Education, Culture and Sport.

He became known for his activity as a writer. His philosophical aphorisms are known as "cabriolas". He also published poetry books. He wrote Sevillanas lyrics that have been sung by various groups, such as Los Romeros de la Puebla. Among his published books are:

- Caballo torero (Cologne, Germany, 1971), created with painter José Manuel Capuletti.
- Cucharero, translated to French
- Mi sueño con el Pájaro y el Toro (1995)
- El centauro de las marismas

== Death ==
Peralta died of respiratory failure on his farm in La Puebla del Río, Seville, Spain. He was 92.
