= La Puebla del Río =

La Puebla del Río, Spain
- city
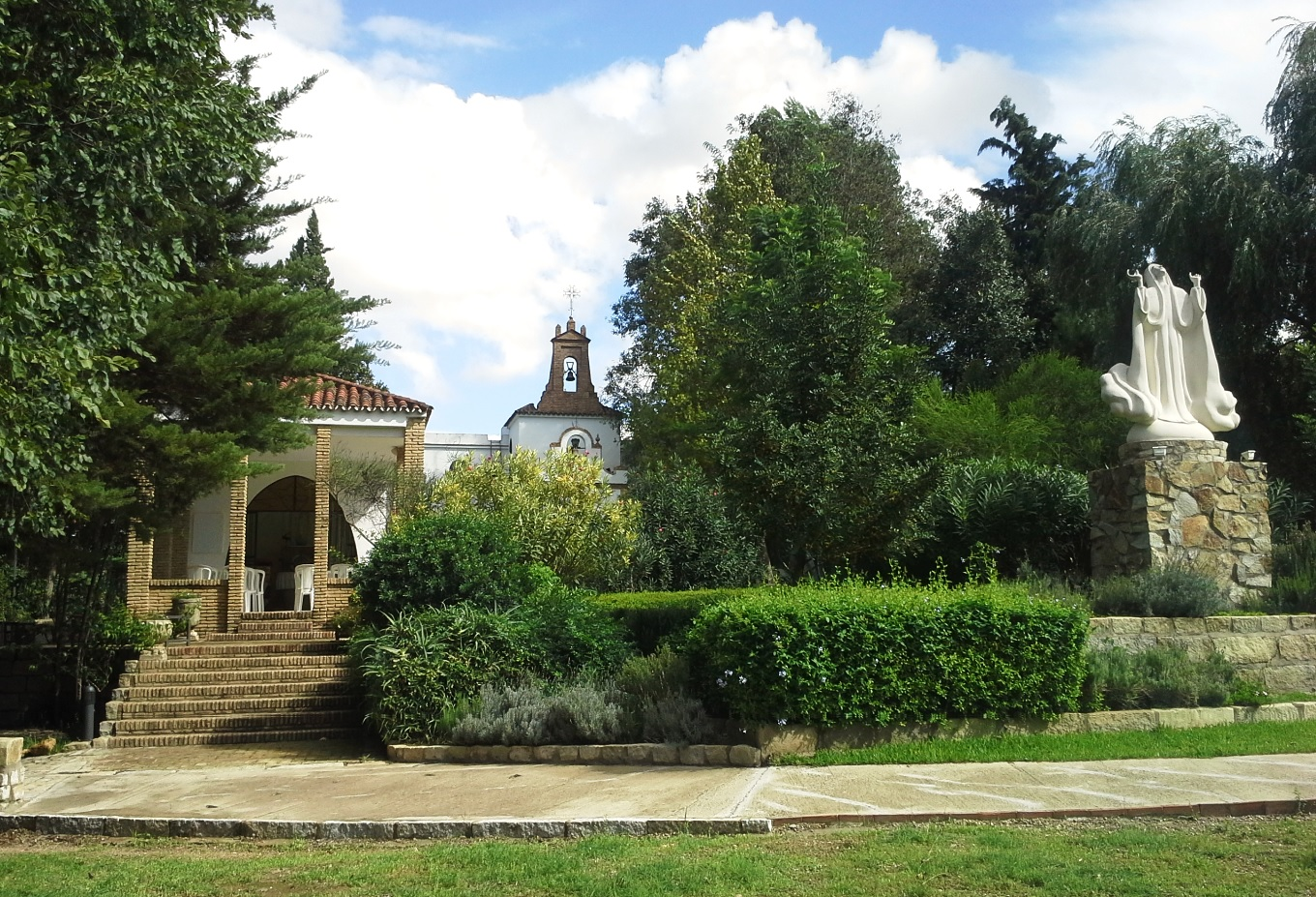
- The Sanctuary of Our Lady of Graces of Onuva - La Puebla del Río (Seville)

- Flag Coat of arms
- Interactive map of La Puebla del Río, Spain
- Coordinates: 37°16′N 6°3′W
- Country: Spain
- Province: Seville
- Municipality: La Puebla del Río

Area
  - Total: 377 km^{2} (146 sq mi)
- Elevation: 20 m (66 ft)

Population (2025-01-01)
  - Total: 11,903
  - Density: 31.6/km^{2} (81.8/sq mi)
- Time zone: UTC+1 (CET)
  - Summer (DST): UTC+2 (CEST)
- Website: www.lapuebladelrio.es

La Puebla del Río is a city located in the province of Seville, Spain. According to the 2016 census (INE), the city has a population of 11995 inhabitants. With a surface of 377,1 square km and located 15 km away SW from Seville (Sevilla)La Puebla del Río is located 37°16′N, 6°03′W at an altitude of 20m. Products such as rice, oranges, corn, cotton, sunflower or wheat are common crops in this town.

The Sanctuary of Our Lady of Graces of Onuva is located in La Puebla del Río.

== Notable people ==
- Ángel Peralta Pineda (1926–2018), Spanish rejoneador
- Rafael Peralta Pineda (1933–2025), Spanish rejoneador

== See also ==
- List of municipalities in Seville
