= Tómbola (film) =

- Directed by: Luis Lucia Mingarro
- Produced by: Manuel J. Goyanes
- Starring: Marisol; Rafael Alonso; Roberto Camardiel; Enrique Ávila; José Marco Davó; Guillermo Marín; Joëlle Rivero
- Cinematography: Antonio L. Ballesteros
- Music by: Augusto Algueró
- Release date: 1962
- Running time: 103 minutes
- Country: Spain

Tómbola (in Latin America released as Los enredos de Marisol) is a 1962 Spanish musical film. It was the third movie to star child singer and actress Marisol.

Tómbola is generally thought to form a trilogy with Marisol's two first movies, A Ray of Light (1960) and An Angel Has Arrived (1961).

== Music ==
- "Preludio"
- "Chiquitina"
- "Los reyes godos"
- "La Marselleise"
- "Una nueva melodía"
- "Tanguillos"
- "Tómbola"
- "Lobo, lobito"
- "Con los ojos abiertos"
- "Fandangos (Nadie lo sabe cantar)"
- "Final Tómbola"
