= Las 4 bodas de Marisol =

- Directed by: Luis Lucia
- Written by: Fernando García de la Vega, Manuel Ruiz Castillo, Alfonso Paso and Luis Lucia
- Produced by: Manuel Goyanes
- Release date: 1967
- Country: Spain
- Language: Spanish

Las 4 bodas de Marisol (or Las cuatro bodas de Marisol; lit. 'Marisol's four weddings') is a 1967 Spanish musical film starring Marisol, French actor Jean-Claude Pascal, and Isabel Garcés. The film was written by Fernando García de la Vega, Manuel Ruiz Castillo, Alfonso Paso and Luis Lucia and directed by the latter.

== Plot ==
Young Spanish film star Marisol is shooting in Spain under the direction of American film director Frank Moore. They fall in love. The film's producer, David Gordon, has an idea to get them married to publicize the film. Frank proposes to Marisol and wants their wedding to take place before the end of principal photography. Marisol suspects that he is in cahoots with the producer and only marries her for a publicity stunt. So she sets up a trap for them.

== Cast ==
- Marisol as Marisol
- Jean-Claude Pascal as Frank Moore
- Isabel Garcés as Isabel, Ramos de la Vega's widow
- Daniel Martín as Dr. Pierre Durán
- Emilio Gutiérrez Caba as Rafael
- Axel Darna as Martin
