= Stop at Tenerife =

- Film poster
- Spanish: Escala en Tenerife
- Directed by: León Klimovsky
- Written by: José Gallardo; León Klimovsky; Luis Lucas Ojeda; Jesús María de Arozamena
- Produced by: Alberto Soifer
- Cinematography: Emilio Foriscot
- Edited by: Antonio Gimeno
- Music by: Adolfo Waitzman
- Production company: Este Films
- Release date: 26 October 1964
- Running time: 93 minutes
- Country: Spain
- Language: Spanish

Stop at Tenerife (Spanish: Escala en Tenerife) is a 1964 Spanish musical comedy film directed by León Klimovsky and starring the Manuel de la Calva. While travelling on a ship to Brazil, the duo's journey ends in Tenerife after they are left behind during a stopover.

== Cast ==
- Manuel de la Calva as Himself
- Ethel Rojo
- Elena María Tejeiro
- Trini Alonso
- Chicho Gordillo
- José María Caffarel
- José Miguel Ariza
- Pedro Rodríguez de Quevedo
- Lili Muráti

== Bibliography ==
- Mira, Alberto. Historical Dictionary of Spanish Cinema. Scarecrow Press, 2010.
