= Sanctuary of Our Lady of Graces of Onuva =

Shrine in Seville, Andalusia, Spain

- Santuario de Nuestra Señora de las Gracias de Onuva
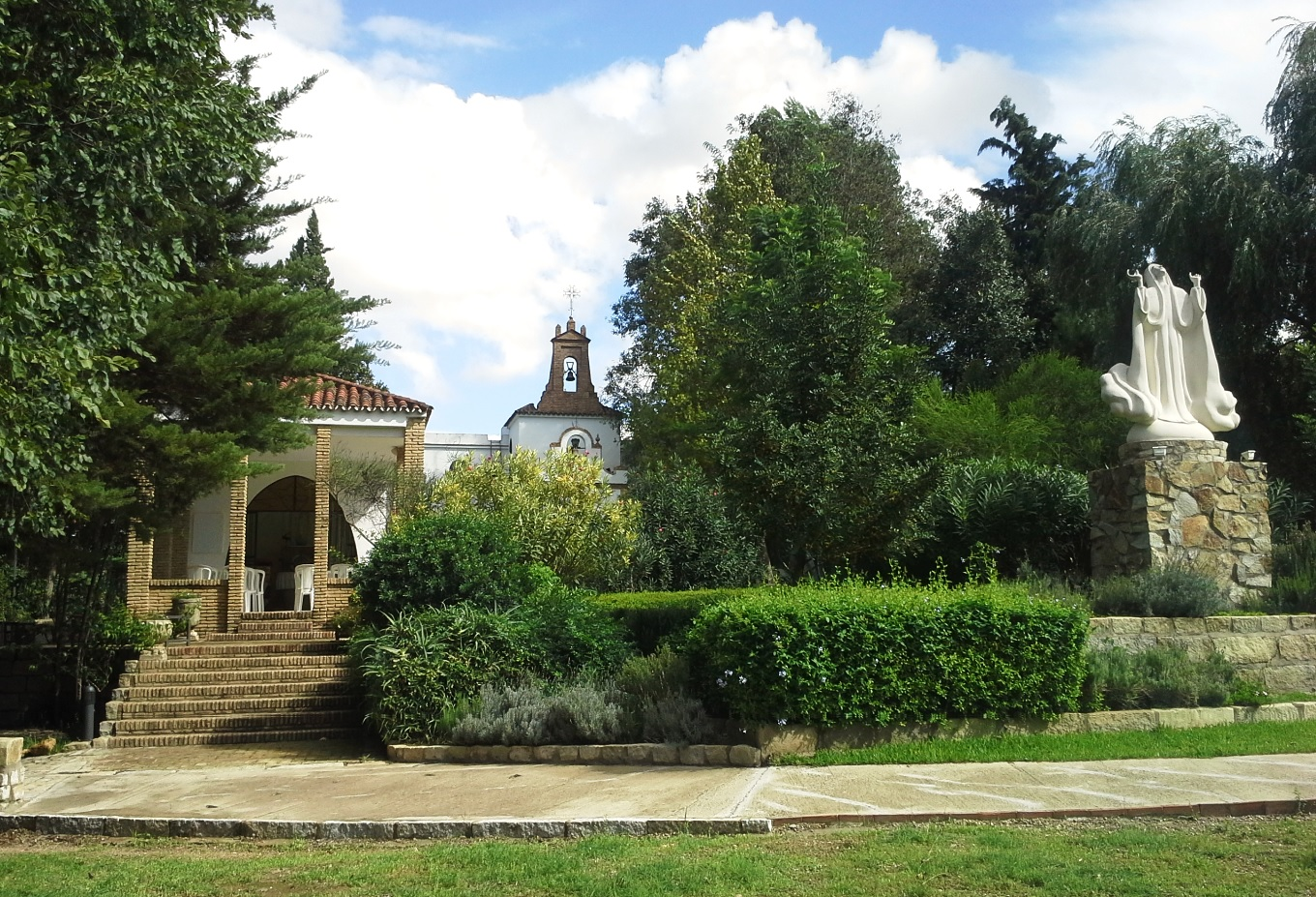
- General view of the Shrine of Our Lady of Graces of Onuva

- Location of the Sanctuary of Onuva in the region of Andalusia, south of Spain

Religion
- Affiliation: Catholic Church
- Province: Province of Seville
- Region: Roman Catholic Archdiocese of Seville
- Rite: Roman Rite
- Patron: Our Lady of Graces
- Year consecrated: 1974

Location
- Location: La Puebla del Río
- Municipality: La Puebla del Río
- Country: Spain
- Interactive map of Sanctuary of Our Lady of Graces of Onuva
- Territory: Andalusia Spain
- Coordinates: 37°16′31.0″N 6°06′43.3″W

The Sanctuary of Our Lady of Graces of Onuva, located in the municipality of La Puebla del Río, province of Seville, region of Andalusia, in Spain, is a Marian shrine that marks the exact place where a young man of his name Jesús José Cabrera claimed to have witnessed several apparitions of the Blessed Virgin Mary and two appearances of Jesus Christ himself.

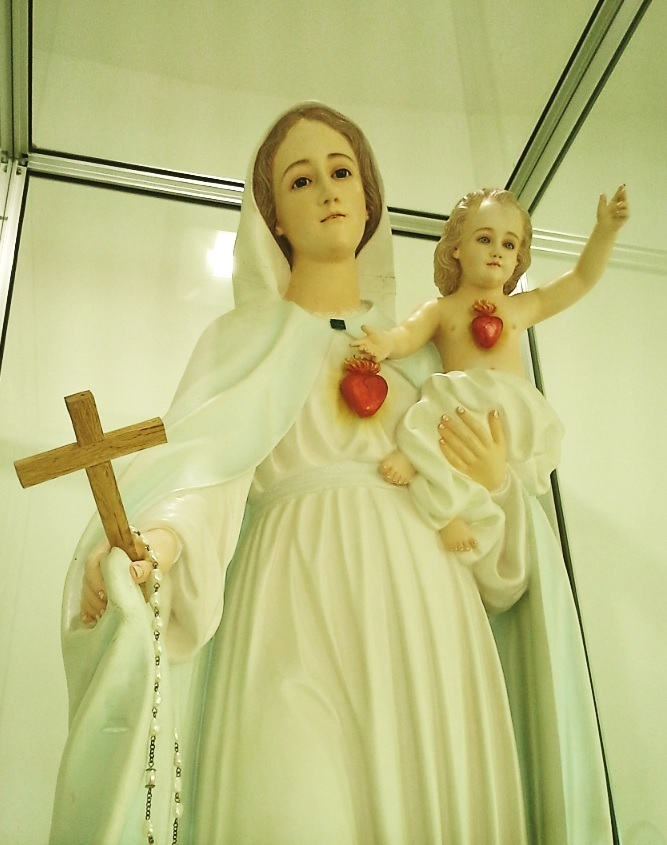
The Our Lady of Graces of Onuva with Child Jesus.

== History of the Marian shrine of Onuva ==
The history of the Shrine of Our Lady of Graces of Onuva is directly related to the Marian apparitions received by the young Jesús José Cabrera between 1968 and 1976. The land where the apparitions of Jesus and Mary took place was acquired by the seer and to this land he was given the name of ONUVA, who, like Jesus himself have explained to the seer, means "Land of Mercy".

In one of Her apparitions, the Blessed Virgin Mary allegedly asked to the seer to build a chapel at the site which is today the central part of the shrine and which is venerated the main image of Our Lady of Graces with the Child Jesus. With the passage of time, and even today, the sanctuary was enlarged, so there are already several new places of worship (a monument to the Sacred Heart of Jesus, another to Saint Michael the Archangel, the Stations of the Cross, a Chapel dedicated to Our Lady of Sorrows, etc.) increasing that way the ability to host the pilgrims in the open enclosure.

Actually, there is in the Sanctuary of Onuva a shelter for the poor and disabled people.

== Gallery ==
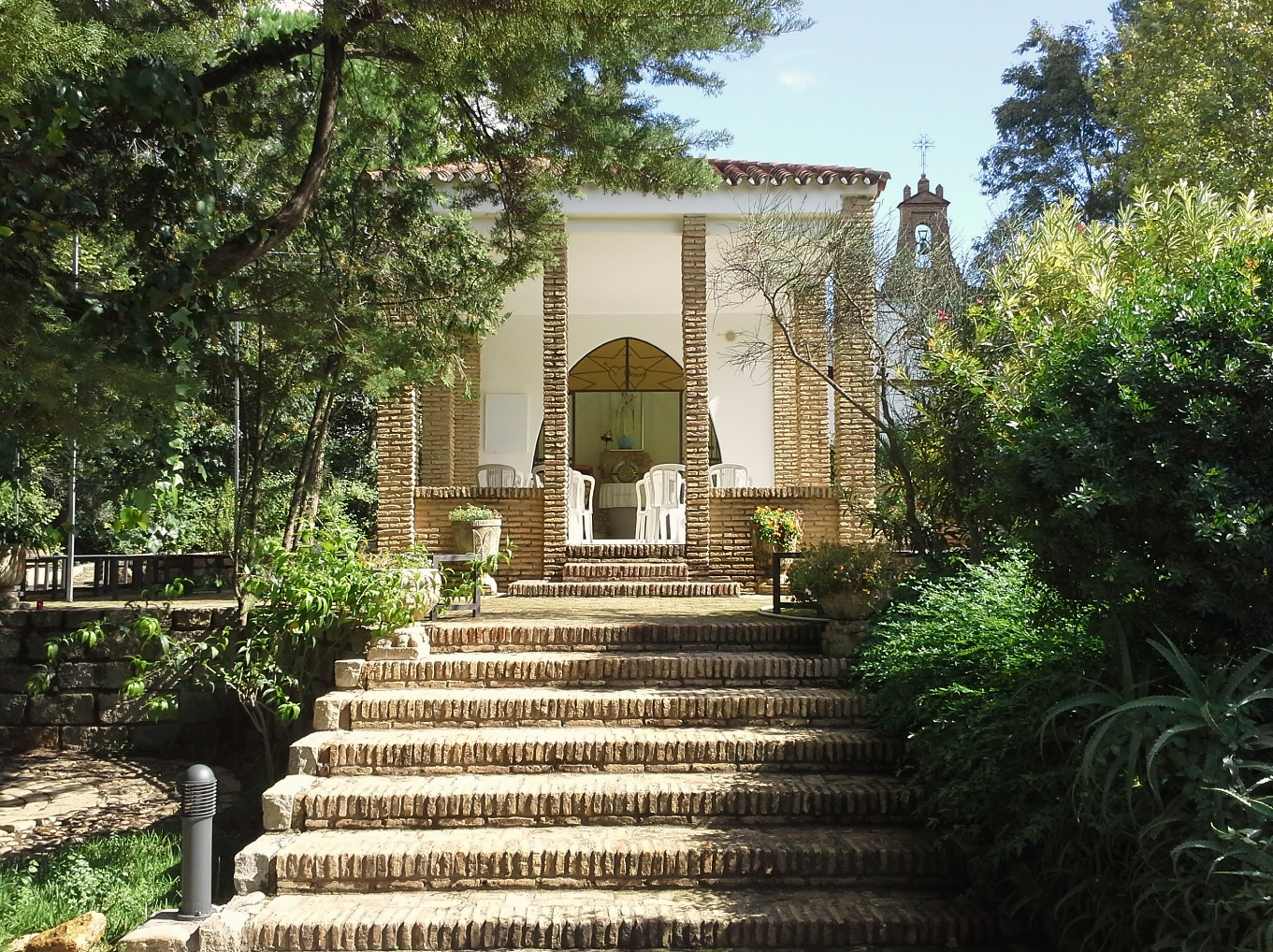
The Chapel of Our Lady of Graces of Onuva

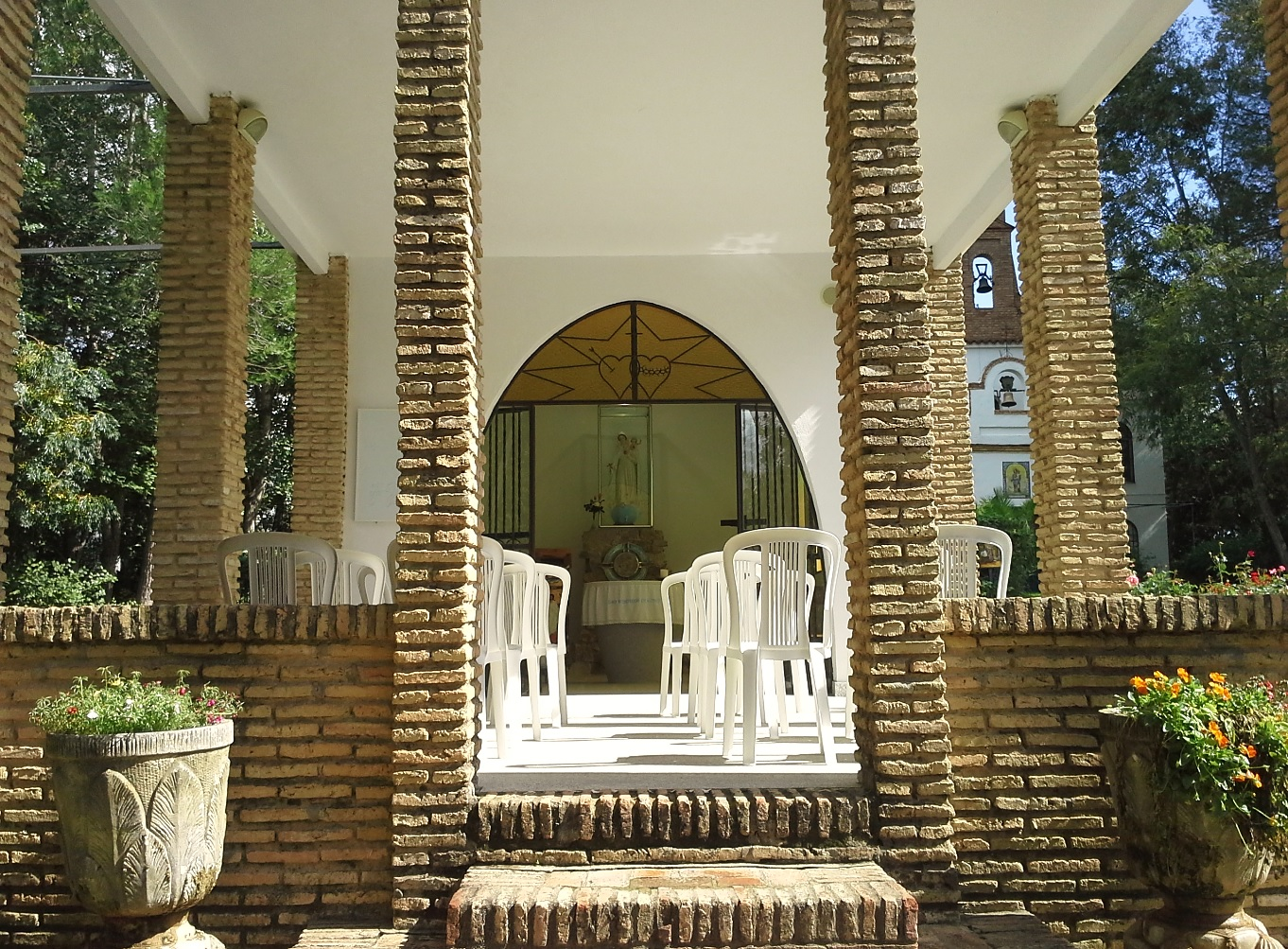
Entry of the Chapel of Our Lady of Graces of Onuva

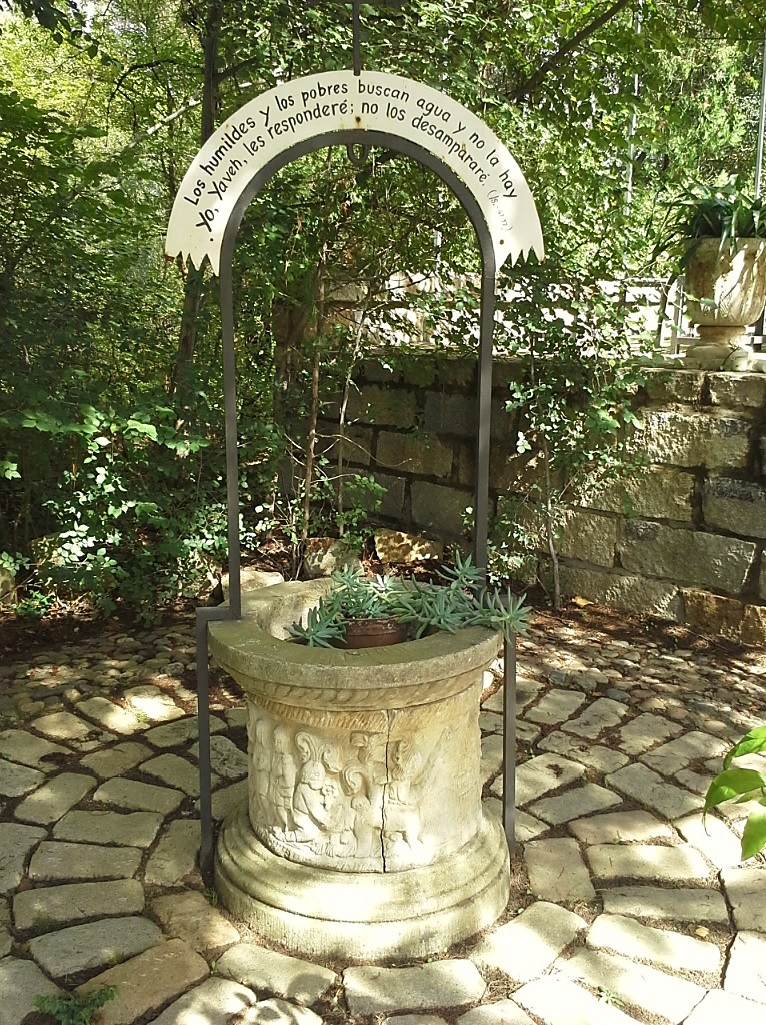
The water well blessed by Our Lady of Graces of Onuva

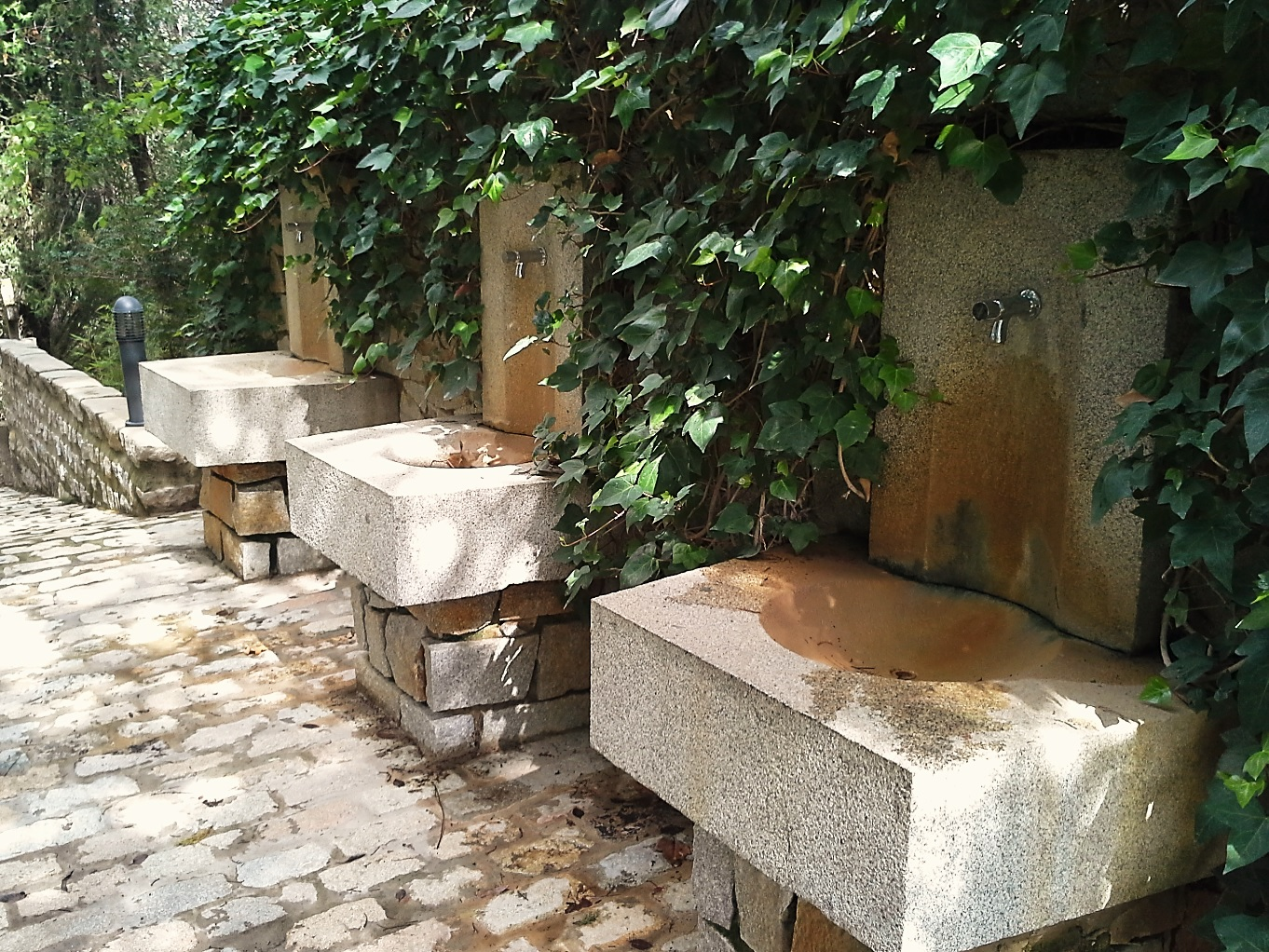
The fountains of the water well blessed by Our Lady of Graces of Onuva

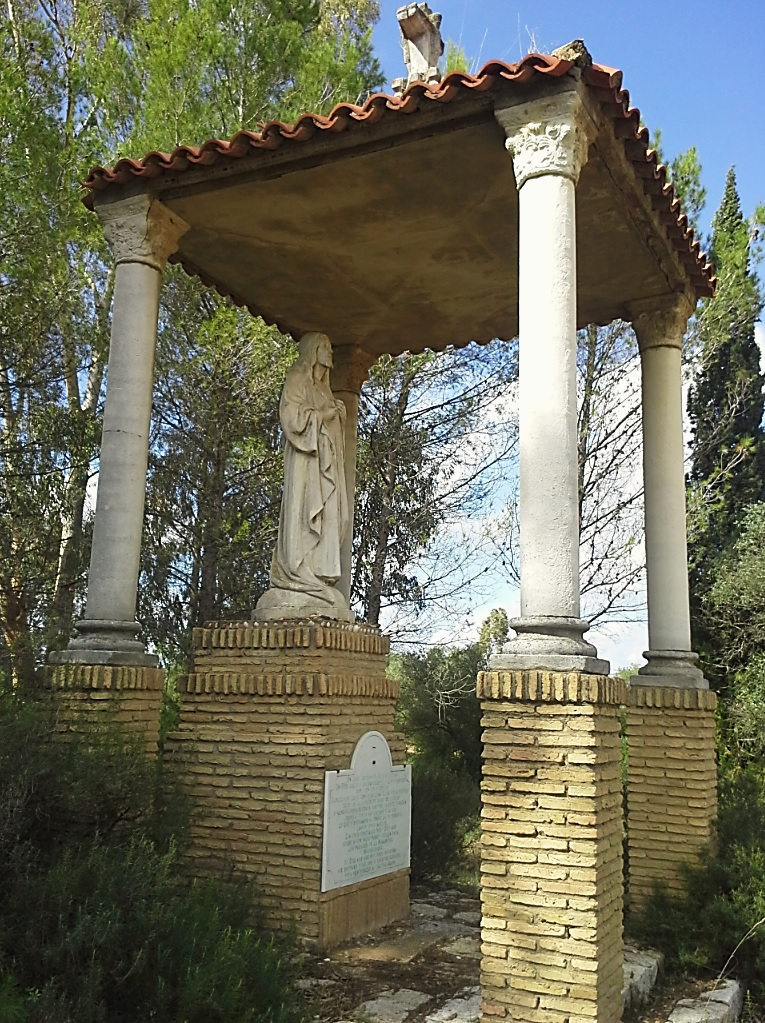
The monument of the Sacred Heart of Jesus in the Mount Pitiforo

== See also ==
- Marian apparition
- Shrines to the Virgin Mary
- Catholic Marian church buildings
