= An Angel Has Arrived =

- Spanish: Ha llegado un ángel
- Directed by: Luis Lucia
- Written by: José Luis Colina; Alfonso Paso; M. Sebares
- Produced by: Benito Perojo; Manuel J. Goyanes; Cesáreo González
- Starring: Marisol; Isabel Garcés; Carlos Larrañaga; Julio Sanjuán; Cesáreo Quezadas
- Cinematography: Antonio L. Ballesteros
- Edited by: José Antonio Rojo
- Music by: Augusto Algueró; Antonio Guijarro
- Release date: 8 June 1961
- Running time: 93 minutes
- Country: Spain
- Language: Spanish

An Angel Has Arrived, better known under its Spanish title Ha llegado un ángel, is a 1961 Spanish musical film directed by Luis Lucia, starring child star Marisol and Isabel Garcés, with music by Augusto Algueró and lyrics by Antonio Guijarro.

An Angel Has Arrived is generally thought to form a trilogy with Marisol's first and third films, A Ray of Light (1960) and Tómbola (1962).

== Plot ==
Marisol, who has recently lost her father at sea, leaves Cádiz to travel by train to Madrid to live with her uncle Ramón. When she arrives at his house, she realizes that he lives in a family that is falling apart because of her aunt Leonor, obsessed only with appearing to her friends, and who has spoiled her children, Javier, Churri, Jorge, and Pili. Javier spends his time partying, Churri flirting with various suitors, Jorge exercising and neglecting his studies, and Pili, still a child, going to the movies.

Her aunt and her cousins receive her coldly and despise her until they discover that the girl has 25,000 pesetas with her from the sale of her parents' furniture, allowing her to stay but only in the service area where the Galician maid Herminia takes her –and a little stowaway that she met on the train and that she brought into the house in a suitcase– under her protection. Little by little, thanks to her kindness and sympathy, and with the help of Herminia and Peque, Marisol wins over her older cousins.

Javier gets into trouble with a deal that threatens to land him in jail, and Marisol decides to get the money any way she can. Since she knows how to sing and dance, she auditions for a film, but she doesn't get the role because the lead actress fears that she will overshadow her. She also competes in a television singing contest accompanied by the group of students she met on the train, finishing second and winning only one mattress. The producer of the film she auditioned for sees her on television and hires her immediately, thanks to which she is able to pay Javier's debts anonymously.

Marisol, accompanied by Herminia and Peque, leave the family house without giving any explanation, but not before Herminia puts her foot down, telling the family everything she has kept to herself for so long at their service. Later, uncle Ramón and Javier are shocked when they find Marisol in a park dressed poorly, playing a barrel organ, and begging, until they realize that she is making a film.

== Background ==
An Angel Has Arrived is the second film to star child singer and actress Marisol following A Ray of Light. It is the first of six films in which Marisol shared the bill with Isabel Garcés. The film was a major commercial success. Marisol won the 1961 Placa San Juan Bosco for Best Spanish Film Performer for her performance in the film.

== Cast ==
- Marisol as Marisol Gallardo
- Isabel Garcés as Herminia
- Carlos Larrañaga as Javier
- José Marco Davó as Don Ramón
- Ana María Custodio as Doña Leonor
- Raquel Daina as Estrella
- Ángeles Macua as Churri
- Pilar Sanclemente as Pili
- Francisco Váquez as Jorge
- Jesús Puente as film director
- Francisco Camoiras as film director assistant
- Jesús Álvarez as himself
- Jaime Blanch as student
- Cesáreo Quezadas "Pulgarcito" as Peque
- Julio Sanjuán as Don Leonardo

== Soundtrack ==
Ha llegado un ángel

Soundtrack album by Marisol
- Released: 1961
- Label: Montilla

Marisol chronology
| Marisol en Un rayo de luz (1960) | Ha llegado un ángel (1961) | Tómbola (1962) |

Singles from Ha llegado un ángel
- 1. "Estando contigo / Rumbita / Canción de Marisol / Bulerías" Released: 1961; 2. "Ola, ola, ola / Jotas / Canción de Marisol / En el tren" Released: 1961

An Angel Has Arrived is a musical film featuring songs composed especially for the film by Augusto Algueró with lyrics by Antonio Guijarro, as well as traditional folk music, performed by Marisol.

Televisión Española (TVE) selected through a national final the song from the film "Estando contigo" performed by Conchita Bautista as the Spanish entry at the Eurovision Song Contest 1961 where it placed ninth in a field of sixteen. The song "Ola, ola, ola", composed by Algueró with lyrics by Joaquín Gasa and Santiago Guardia Moreu, had competed in 1959 with the title "Mare Nostrum" in the first edition of the Festival de la Canción Mediterránea, performed by both Mary Santpere and Lolita Garrido placing third overall, first among the Spanish songs.

The soundtrack album was released in Spain by Montilla in a vinyl LP. Montilla subsequently released the album in different vinyl LP editions in Colombia, Mexico, Peru, the United States, and Venezuela. Montilla released in Spain two EPs from the album distributed by Zafiro, one with the songs "Estando contigo" / "Rumbita" / "Canción de Marisol" / "Bulerías", and another with "Ola, ola, ola" / "Jotas" / "Canción de Marisol" / "En el tren".

=== Songs ===
- "En el tren" (Algueró, Guijarro)
- "Ola, ola, ola" (Algueró, Gasa, Guardia Moreu)
- "Rumbita" (Popular)
- "Alegrías" (Popular)
- "La canción de Marisol" (Algueró, Guijarro)
- "Bulerías" (Popular)
- "Jotas" (Popular)
- "Estando contigo" (Algueró, Guijarro)

== Legacy ==
=== Tributes ===
The 2003 compilation album tribute to Augusto Algueró where different artists cover his most famous songs features two songs from An Angel Has Arrived: Paco Ortega e Isabel Montero cover "Estando contigo" and Papá Levante covers "Ola, ola, ola".

Gala 1 of the eleventh season of Operación Triunfo, aired on 19 January 2020 on La 1 of Televisión Española, opened with all its contestants paying tribute to Marisol performing a group medley of two songs from An Angel Has Arrived: "Estando contigo" and "Ola, ola, ola", along with "Tómbola".

On 25 January 2020, the Academy of Cinematographic Arts and Sciences of Spain paid tribute to Marisol, who was the 2020 Honorary Goya Award laureate, at the 34th Goya Awards ceremony with the performance of two songs from An Angel Has Arrived: Amaia performed "La canción de Marisol" and Marisol's own daughter Celia Flores performed "Estando contigo".
