= Cabriola =

1965 film directed by Mel Ferrer

Cabriola is a 1965 Spanish musical comedy film starring Marisol and Ángel Peralta Pineda. It was written and directed by Mel Ferrer.

It was also known as Every Day Is a Holiday.

== Plot ==
A brother and sister train a horse for bullfighting.

== Production ==
The film was based on an original story by Ferrer who developed it as a vehicle for Marisol. He became familiar with her making La Sell in Spain.
