= Los días del pasado =

1978 film

- Theatrical release poster
- Directed by: Mario Camus
- Screenplay by: Mario Camus; Antonio José Betancor
- Story by: Manuel Matji; Miguel Rubio
- Starring: Marisol; Antonio Gades
- Cinematography: Hans Burmann
- Music by: Antón García Abril
- Production company: Impala
- Distributed by: Warner Española
- Release date: 1978
- Running time: 109 minutes
- Country: Spain
- Language: Spanish

Los días del pasado is a 1978 Spanish film directed by Mario Camus starring Pepa Flores and Antonio Gades.

== Plot ==
In 1945, Andalusian teacher Juana moves to the Cantabrian village of Terán de Cabuérniga in the hope of finding her boyfriend Antonio, who may have hidden in the mountains with the Maquis instead of fleeing to Algeria.

== Cast ==
- Antonio Gades as Antonio
- Marisol as Juana
- Manuel Alexandre as Inspector de Educación
- Sonsoles Benedicto as Amalia
- Gustavo Bergés as Angelín
- Saturno Cerra as Saturnino
- Antonio Iranzo as Pepe
- José María Labernié as Guardia Civil
- Mario Pardo as Miliciano
- Claudio Rodríguez as Cabo
- Juan Sala
- Fernando Sánchez Polack as Lucio
- José Yepes as Miliciano

== Reception ==
Jesús Fernández Santos of El País considered the film to be "well set and remarkably photographed, heartfelt, crafted with great lucidity, conscious and timely.".

== See also ==
- List of Spanish films of 1978
