= Julio Escalada =

Julio Escalada (born 1963 in Madrid) is a founding member of the Academia de las Artes Escénicas de España (AAEE). He is a dramatist and dramaturgy teacher. Much of his career has been devoted to acting and stage direction.

== Biography ==
Escalada has a Bachelor of Interpretation and Direction of Scene and Dramaturgy at the Royal School of Dramatic Arts (RESAD). He has also studied French Philology at the Complutense University of Madrid and Literature at the University of Alcalá de Henares.

He began his acting career in the Pequeño Taller de Teatro (PTT). Since then he has worked in theater, television and cinema. Since 2008 he is exclusively dedicated to the writing, research and teaching of dramatic art: Dramaturgy and interpretation.

Many of his theatrical texts have been staged or published in different editorials.

He has been awarded on several occasions, highlighting the award of the Sociedad General de Autores y Editores to his work Invierno (Winter) belonging to the Tetralogy of the Four Seasons.

He has directed Oscar Wilde's A Woman Without Importance', Marc-Gilbert Sauvajon's Le Canard à l'orange based on William Douglas Home's The Secretary Bird, Brandon Thomas's Charley's Aunt, Chazz Palmintieri's Faithful, etc.

He teaches dramatic writing and dramaturgy at the Royal School of Dramatic Arts of Madrid (RESAD) and is part of the coordinating team of the Master of Dramatic Writing of the Association of Theater Authors / University of Alcalá.

== Plays ==
- Acércate más. Estrenada en el Teatro Alfil en 1994
- Reservado el derecho de admisión. 1997
- Te vas, me dejas y me abandonas (Mutis). Estrenada en 1998 en el Teatro Reina Victoria de Madrid con dirección de Tomás Gayo y protagonizada por María José Goyanes y Paula Sebastián. Estrenada en Buenos Aires y México DF. (http://www.julioescalada.com/obras_pdf/te%20vas.pdf)
- Singladura. Beca de la Comunidad de Madrid 1998
- Primavera (Cuatro estaciones. Mención especial del Premio Nacional de Teatro Calderón de la Barca 1999. Estrenada en España con dirección de Roberto Cerdá y en Londres con dirección de William Gregory. (http://www.julioescalada.com/obras_pdf/Primavera.pdf)
- Verano (Cuatro estaciones). Publicada en 2000. (http://www.julioescalada.com/obras_pdf/Verano.pdf)
- Vidas privadas (2003), de Noël Coward.
- Invierno (Cuatro estaciones). Premio SGAE 2004. .julioescalada.com/obras_pdf/Invierno.pdf)
- Sois la bomba. Estrenada en 2006 protagonizada por Lola Baldrich, María José del Valle y Arantxa del Sol. (http://www.julioescalada.com/obras_pdf/sois%20la%20bomba.pdf)
- En el borde. Beca de la Comunidad de Madrid 2006. (http://www.julioescalada.com/obras_pdf/En%20el%20borde.pdf)
- Otoño (Cuatro estaciones). Publicada en 2006 en la revista Acotaciones con un estudio global de Pedro Víllora sobre la tetralogía Cuatro estaciones. (http://www.julioescalada.com/obras_pdf/Oto%F1o.pdf)
- A tientas. Historia de cuatro compañeros de una empresa de ventas unidos por lazos afectivos que van dirimiendo sus diferencias o afianzando sus querencias en la sala de personal entre ´"café y café" a lo largo de una semana.
- Bestias de parque. Texto en el que se dan cita diversas situaciones extravagantes, no exentas de crueldad, acontecidas a lo largo de un día en un parque de una gran ciudad.
- El peso de la religión. Descrita como apocalipsis sicalíptica

== Published Essays ==
- Disparates. Traducción y edición de textos teatrales de Llorenç Villalonga. RESAD/Ed. Fundamentos.
- El caballero de Olmedo. Edición del texto de Lope de Vega. Ed. Bolchiro.
- Manual de Dramaturgia VVAA. Ediciones de la Universidad de Salamanca. Obras de referencia.
