= Mariana Pineda (play) =

Play written by Federico García Lorca

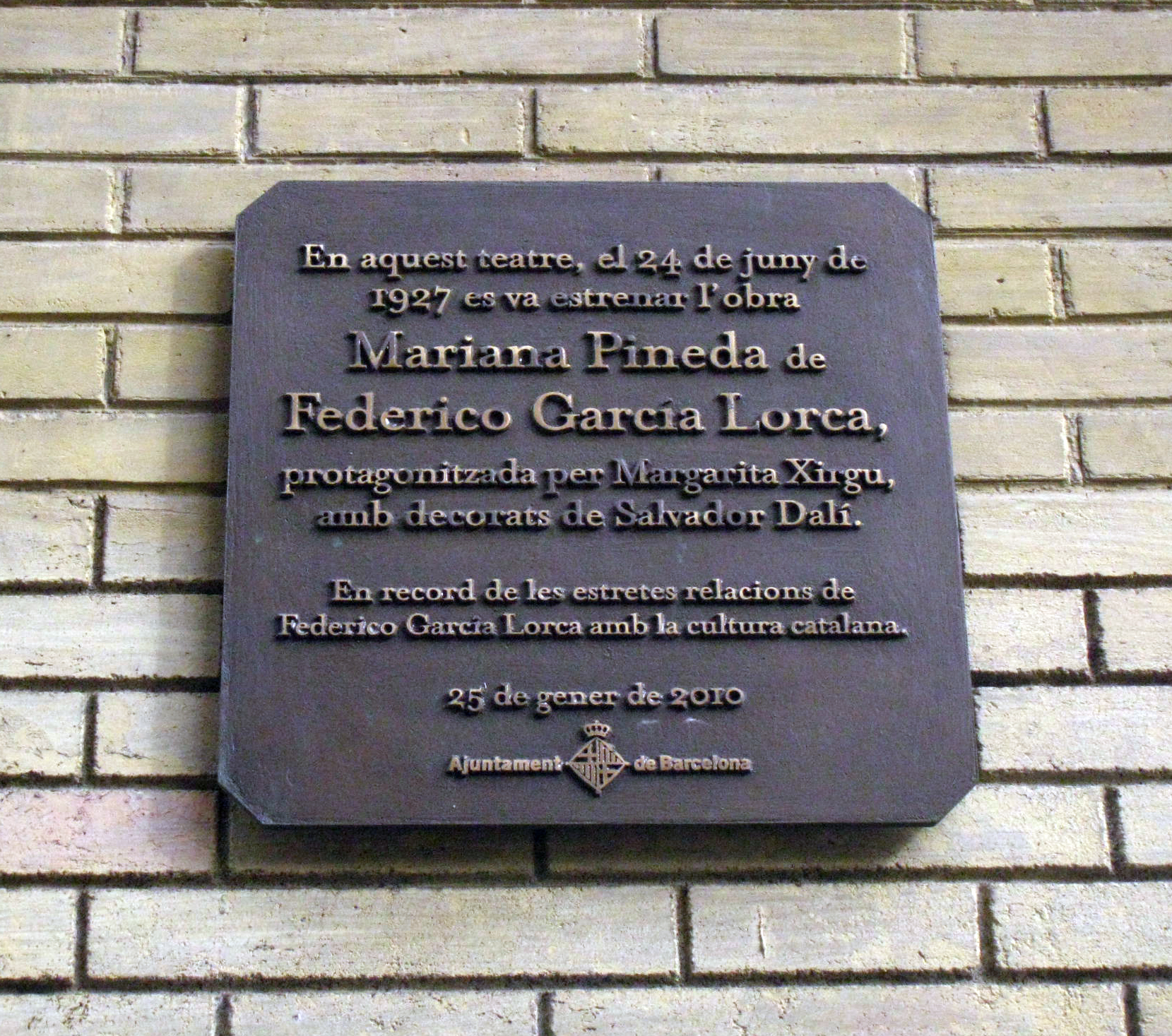

Mariana Pineda is a play by the Spanish playwright and poet Federico García Lorca. It is based on the life of Mariana de Pineda Muñoz, whose opposition to Ferdinand VII (and subsequent public execution in 1831 for treason) had become part of the folklore of Granada. The play was written between 1923 and 1925 and was first performed in June 1927 at the Teatre Goya, in Barcelona. That production was directed by García Lorca, with scenic design and costumes by Salvador Dalí, and was performed by the company of Margarida Xirgu. The play received its Madrid première that October, at the Teatro Fontalba.

In contrast to García Lorca's first play, The Butterfly's Evil Spell, which was first performed in 1920 but which closed after only four performances, Mariana Pineda was a success. Consequently, García Lorca often claimed that Mariana Pineda was his first play.

The play figures prominently in the opera Ainadamar (2003) by Osvaldo Golijov.

== Honors ==
The Spanish airline, Iberia, has named one of its airplanes after the play and the person it was based on.

== See also ==
- List of works by Salvador Dalí

== Sources ==
- Edwards, Gwynne. 1980. Lorca: The Theatre Beneath the Sand. London and New York: Marion Boyars. ISBN 0-7145-2771-8.
