= Búsqueme a esa chica =

- Directed by: George Sherman
- Written by: Fernando Palacios, George Sherman
- Produced by: Vicente Coello
- Release date: 1964
- Country: Spain
- Languages: English, Spanish

Búsqueme a esa chica (lit. 'Find me that girl') is a 1964 Spanish musical film starring Marisol and Dúo Dinámico.

Partially in English, the film was written by Vicente Coello and directed by Fernando Palacios and American film director George Sherman.

== Cast ==
- Marisol
- El Dúo Dinámico
