= Proceso a Mariana Pineda =

Spanish historical drama limited television series

- Genre: Historical drama
- Screenplay by: Rafael Moreno Alba; Carmen Icaza; Emilio Romero
- Directed by: Rafael Moreno Alba
- Starring: Pepa Flores; Germán Cobos
- Composer: Jaime Pérez
- Country of origin: Spain
- Original language: Spanish
- No. of seasons: 1
- No. of episodes: 5

Production
- Executive producer: Carmen Icaza
- Producer: Paulino González
- Running time: 60 min (approx.)

Original release
- Network: TVE1
- Release: 13 November – 11 December 1984

Proceso a Mariana Pineda is a Spanish historical drama television miniseries directed by Rafael Moreno Alba, starring Pepa Flores in the leading role of Mariana Pineda. It aired on TVE1 in 1984.

== Premise ==
Set in Granada in 1831, the plot is a dramatisation of the last days of Mariana Pineda, a female champion of the Liberal cause, a detractor of monarchical absolutism, executed by garrote vil during the Ominous Decade after refusing to betray her accomplices in exchange for leniency.

== Cast ==
- Pepa Flores as Mariana Pineda.
- Germán Cobos as Ramón Pedrosa.
- Juanjo Puigcorbé.
- Carlos Larrañaga.
- José María Caffarel.
- Rafael Alonso.
- Tony Isbert.
- Manuel Galiana.
- Antonio Iranzo.
- Valentín Paredes.
- Conrado San Martín.
- José Vivó.
- Rosario Flores as Juanita.
- Enrique San Francisco as Federico.
- Alicia Altabella.
- Teresa del Olmo.
- Sonia Hohmann.

== Production and release ==
Directed by Rafael Moreno Alba, the 4-month-long filming took place in Madrid, Granada, Boadilla del Monte, Carmona, Seville and Huelva. Consisting of 5 episodes, the serial aired on Televisión Española from November 1984 to December 1984.

Series	Episodes	Originally released		
Series	Episodes	First released	Last released	Network
1	5	13 November 1984	11 December 1984	tve

No. in season	Title	Directed by	Original release date
1	"Capítulo 1"	Rafael Moreno Alba	13 November 1984
2	"Capítulo 2"	Rafael Moreno Alba	20 November 1984
3	"Capítulo 3"	Rafael Moreno Alba	27 November 1984
4	"Capítulo 4"	Rafael Moreno Alba	4 December 1984
5	"Capítulo 5"	Rafael Moreno Alba	11 December 1984
