= Dúo Dinámico =

Spanish musical duo

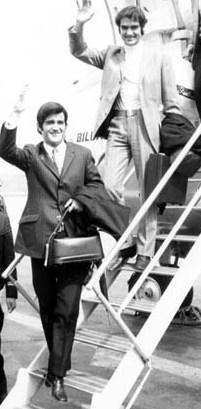
- Dúo Dinámico waving at Barajas Airport in 1968 (left: de la Calva, right: Arcusa)

Background information
- Origin: Barcelona, Spain
- Genre: Pop
- Years active: 1958–1972; 1978–2022
- Labels: EMI; Sony Music; Líderes Entertainment Group
- Members: Manuel de la Calva; Ramón Arcusa

Dúo Dinámico (transl. Dynamic Duo) was a Spanish pop music duo formed by Manuel de la Calva and Ramón Arcusa. Besides singers, they were songwriters and record producers and they starred in four feature films. They were the main precursors of pop music and fandom in Spain and were very popular in the 1960s.

They were the songwriters of "La, la, la", the song that won the Eurovision Song Contest 1968. They received the Latin Grammy Lifetime Achievement Award in 2014.

== History ==
Manolo and Ramón met when they were 16 years old, working as aeronautical engineering apprentices. The duo officially formed on 28 December 1958 in Barcelona. Their first performance before a live audience was on Radio Barcelona; they wanted to be called The Dynamic Boys, but the show host, Enrique Fernández, said he did not speak English and introduced them as Dúo Dinámico, a name the musicians accepted. After that came more radio performances and a contract to sing at La Masía, a famous restaurant in Barcelona, all while they still worked as engineers. Finally, in the summer of 1959 they quit their day jobs to dedicate themselves to their nascent music career.

They recorded their first EP in the fall of 1959, and it was a sales success. From then on, their ascent was spectacular, and they frequently topped the Spanish charts throughout the 1960s with hits like "Quince años tiene mi amor", "Quisiera ser", "Perdóname", "Bailando el twist", "Mari Carmen", "Esos ojitos negros", "Amor de verano", or "Mi chica de ayer". They also starred in four films: Anchor Button (1961), Búsqueme a esa chica (1964), Stop at Tenerife (1964), and Una chica para dos (1966). Their popularity among Spanish music fans was comparable, if not superior, to the one achieved by The Beatles.

The Duo often participated in the various music festivals that took place in Spain at the time. They won the Mediterranean Song Festival in Barcelona in 1966 with "Como ayer"; the Costa Verde Festival in Gijón with "Somos Jóvenes"; they were twice second in the Benidorm Song Festival in 1962 and 1966, with "Quisiera ser" and "Amor amargo"; and they placed second in Eurofestival, the Spanish national selection for the Eurovision Song Contest 1965, with "Esos ojitos negros".

Their greatest achievement came as composers, when their song "La, la, la" won the Eurovision Song Contest 1968, performed by Massiel. This was the first win for Spain in the Eurovision Song Contest, and the only time that it has been the sole winner. (Note: Spain won again in 1969, but tied with other three countries) Initially, Televisión Española had internally selected the song for Joan Manuel Serrat to perform on the contest, and he recorded it and promoted it throughout Europe, but they replaced him after his demand to sing it in Catalan in the contest.

After the sales failure of their 1972 album Mejor que nunca, recorded in London with the collaboration of George Martin, the duo decided to retire, but they kept composing for other artists such as Camilo Sesto and Nino Bravo, and producing for Julio Iglesias, Miguel Gallardo, or José Vélez.

Due to the continuing popularity of their songs, included in the soundtracks of many popular Spanish films and TV shows, and the insistence of various entrepreneurs, the duo made a comeback in 1978. A greatest hits album was released in 1980, and in 1986, they started to record new songs under a new contract with Sony Music. In 1989, one of them, "Resistiré", was included in the soundtrack of Pedro Almodóvar's film Tie Me Up! Tie Me Down!.

The duo was presented with the Latin Grammy Lifetime Achievement Award in 2014.

On 21 September 2007, the jukebox musical Quisiera ser, featuring 24 hits of the Dúo Dinámico, premiered at the Teatro Nuevo Apolo in Madrid.

As of 2020, the duo were still active, performing their hits in yearly live tours throughout Spain.

Manuel de la Calva died on 26 August 2025, at the age of 88.

== Discography ==
=== Albums ===
- Dúo Dinámico (1962)
- Dúo Dinámico (1963)
- Dúo Dinámico (1963)
- Los novios de Marisol (1964)
- Dúo Dinámico (1965)
- El gran Dúo Dinámico (1965)
- Dinamismo juvenil (1967)
- Manolo y Ramón (1970)
- El regreso (1977)
- Duo Dinámico (1986)
- Interpretan éxitos internacionales (1986)
- En forma (1988)
- Con zapatos nuevos (1989)
- Tal cual (1991)
- Viva los 50 (1993)
- P'alante (1997)
- El penúltimo del Dúo Dinámico (2003)
- Somos jóvenes: 50 años (2011)

== Filmography ==
- Anchor Button (1961)
- Búsqueme a esa chica (1964)
- Stop at Tenerife (1964)
- Una chica para dos (1966)

== See also ==
- List of bands from Spain
