= El poder del deseo =

- Directed by: Juan Antonio Bardem
- Written by: Juan Antonio Bardem, Rafael Azcona
- Based on: Joc brut by Manuel de Pedrolo
- Produced by: Serafín García Trueba
- Release date: 1975
- Running time: 117 min
- Country: Spanish
- Language: Spanish

El poder del deseo (lit. 'The power of desire', 'The force of desire') is a 1975 Spanish film starring Marisol and English actor Murray Head. The film was directed by Juan Antonio Bardem. The script was written by him and Rafael Azcona based on the novel Joc brut by Manuel de Pedrolo.

== Plot ==
Murray Head plays Javier, a young man who lives with his mother in an apartment and works in an advertising agency, conducting surveys on the effectiveness of advertisements. One day, he accidentally meets a young woman who needs help with her car. After a while, they begin a relationship, but she is very elusive and doesn't want anyone seeing her with him.

== Cast ==
- Marisol as Juna
- Murray Head as Javier
