= Los Brincos =

Spanish rock band

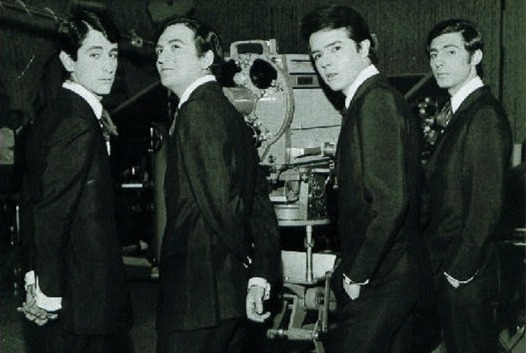

Los Brincos (the Jumps) were one of the most successful Spanish rock bands of the 1960s, and were sometimes called the "Spanish Beatles".

The group was formed in 1964. The members were Fernando Arbex (drums), Manuel González (bass), Juan Pardo (guitar) and Antonio "Junior" Morales (guitar). All four sang, and vocal harmonies were an important part of their sound.

Early hits included "Flamenco" (1964), "Sola" (1965), "Tú me dijiste adiós" ("You Told Me Goodbye" – 1965, B-side "Eres Tú"). "Mejor" (1966) and "Un sorbito de champán" ("A Sip of Champagne" – 1966).

After two years of success, Juan and Junior left the group to form a duo. Los Brincos recruited new members and continued to have hits. "Lola" (no relation to the Kinks song) was number one in the summer of 1967.

Their third album Contraband (1968) was produced by Larry Page. Mundo, demonio y carne (1970) was less successful and the band broke up shortly after.

They reformed in 2000, but Fernando Arbex died in 2003. Former member Júnior died in 2014.

== Discography ==
- 1964 Los Brincos (Novola, NL - 1001) — split evenly between songs in Spanish and English.
- 1966 Los Brincos (Novola, NLX-1.004) — this and subsequent albums sung mostly in Spanish.
- 1968 Contrabando (Novola, NL 1010) — produced by Larry Page.
- 1970 Mundo, demonio y carne (Novola, NLX-1019 S).
- 1970 World, Evil & Body (Novola, NLX-1020 S) — English version of Mundo, demonio y carne
- 2000 Eterna juventud (EPF Entertainment, EPF-014-CD) — reunion album.
