= Luis Lucia =

Spanish film director and screenwriter

- Born: Luis Lucia Mingarro; 24 May 1914; Valencia, Spain
- Died: 12 March 1984 (aged 69); Madrid, Spain
- Years active: 1942 - 1973

Luis Lucia Mingarro (24 May 1914, in Valencia – 12 March 1984, in Madrid) was a Spanish film director and screenwriter.

His father, Luis Lucia, was the Spanish minister of communications in 1935. He studied Law and was the attorney of CIFESA film studios.

As director, he discovered child prodigies Marisol, Rocío Dúrcal and made them stars. He tried the same with Ana Belén but her film debut Zampo y yo was a flop.

He was interred at Cementerio de Majadahonda, Majadahonda, Madrid, Spain.

== Filmography ==
- Follow the Legion (1942)
- El 13 - 13 (1944) - ɬɬ
- Un hombre de negocios (1945) - ɬ
- The Princess of the Ursines (1947) - ɬɬ
- Dos cuentos para dos (1948) - ɬ
- Noche de Reyes (1949) - ɬ
- Currito of the Cross (1949) - ɬ
- The Duchess of Benameji (1949) - ɬɬ
- Woman to Woman (1950) - ɬ
- The Dream of Andalusia (1951) - ɬ
- Lola the Coalgirl (1952) - ɬ
- Gloria Mairena (1952) - ɬ
- Cerca de la ciudad (1952) - ɬ
- Sister San Sulpicio (1952) - ɬ
- Jeromin (1953) - ɬ
- Airport (1953) - ɬ
- Morena Clara (1954) - ɬ
- An Andalusian Gentleman (1954) - ɬ
- La hermana alegría (1954) - ɬ
- El piyayo (1955) - ɬ
- Esa voz es una mina (1955) - ɬ
- La lupa (1955) - ɬ
- La vida en un bloc (1956) - ɬɬ
- Un marido de ida y vuelta (1957) - ɬ
- La muralla (1958) - ɬ
- Un ángel tuvo la culpa (1959) - ɬɬ
- Molokai (La isla maldita) (1959) - ɬ
- El príncipe encadenado (1960) - ɬ
- Un rayo de luz (1960) - ɬ
- Ha llegado un ángel (1961) - ɬ
- Tómbola (1962) - ɬ
- Rocío de La Mancha (1962) - ɬ
- Canción de juventud (1962) - ɬɬ
- Crucero de verano (1964) - ɬ
- Zampo y yo (1965) - ɬ
- Grandes amigos (1966) - ɬ
- Las cuatro bodas de Marisol (1967) - ɬ
- Solos los dos (1968) - ɬ
- Pepa Doncel (1969) - ɬ
- La orilla (1970) - ɬ
- The Rebellious Novice (1971) - ɬ
- Entre dos amores (1972) - ɬ

ɬ-director and screenwriter
ɬɬ-director
