= A Bullet for Sandoval =

1969 film by Julio Buchs

- Directed by: Julio Buchs
- Starring: Ernest Borgnine
- Cinematography: Francisco Sempere
- Music by: Gianni Ferrio
- Release date: 1969
- Countries: Italy; Spain
- Language: Italian

A Bullet for Sandoval (a.k.a. Los desesperados, a.k.a. Those Desperate Men Who Smell of Dirt and Death, a.k.a. Desperate Men) is a 1969 Spaghetti Western film. It is a co-production between Italy (where is known as Quei disperati che puzzano di sudore e di morte) and Spain (where it was released as Los Desperados). The film was generally well received by critics. For years, it was thought that famed Italian horror film director Lucio Fulci directed this western, but that was later disputed by the film's lead star George Hilton.

== Plot ==
John Warner is a soldier for the Confederate States of America. When he receives a message that his lover is about to deliver a child he becomes a deserter. On his way to her he is captured and brought before a tribunal. Yet two old friends make sure he can escape. He makes it to the town where he expects his lover to be. Only is he too late too marry her because she's died in the meantime. He tries to take care of his child as a single father but the citizens of this town aren't supportive and thus another tragedy takes place.

The love of army deserter John Warner dies at deliverance and their baby child perishes after its grandfather, the landowner Sandoval, rejects it. Warner forms a feared outlaw gang with of two fellow deserters, one runaway lay brother, and some outlaws that join along the way. The local ranchers call in the army for protection, but except for an episode where Warner refuses to make a woman a hostage for money, we mainly see the gang harass Sandoval. One of the gang eventually tries to sell out Warner for a reward. The four core members stay together until Warner has avenged himself on Sandoval, and then they die a spectacular death at a shootout in a bullfighting arena.

== Cast ==
- George Hilton as Corporal John Warner
- Ernest Borgnine as Don Pedro Sandoval
- Alberto De Mendoza as Lucky Boy
- Leo Anchóriz as Padre Converso
- Annabella Incontrera as Rosa Sandoval
- Antonio Pica as Sam Paul
- Manuel Miranda as Francisco Sandoval
- Gustavo Rojo as Guadalupano
- Andrea Aureli as Morton
- Manuel De Blas as José Sandoval

== Reception ==
In his discussion of the cases of double motives in Spaghetti Western films Fridlund contrasts stories like A Bullet for Sandoval - where the revenge motive of Warner comes into conflict with the monetary motive of some gang members - with the bounty killer pair in For a Few Dollars More, where at first their common monetary motive creates a conflict which is resolved when the revenge motive of the Mortimer character is revealed and he leaves the collection of all the bounty to the Man with No Name character.
