= Juan Pardo (singer) =

Spanish singer

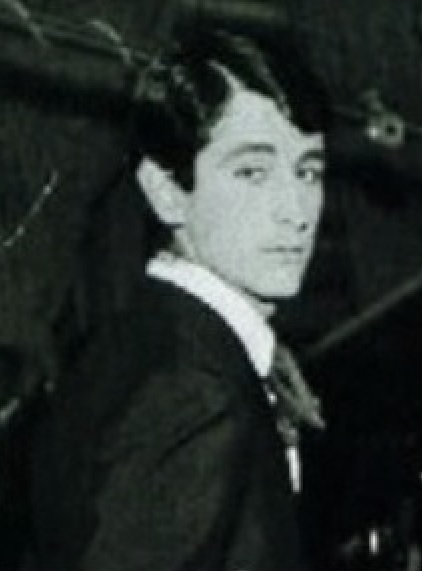

Background information
- Born: November 11, 1942 (age 83); Palma de Mallorca, Spain
- Occupations: Singer, songwriter
- Instruments: Voice, guitar
- Formerly of: Los Brincos, Juan y Junior

Juan Pardo is a Spanish born singer who had a hit in the early 1980s with "No Me Hables".

== Background ==
Born Juan Ignacio Pardo Suárez on November 11, 1942, in Spain, Juan Pardo is singer-songwriter. He was a member of the group Los Brincos. He later teamed up with Junior, a former Brincos member to form the duo Juan y Junior. At the end of 1980, he returned to the musical scene to launch his successful international career.

== Career ==
It was reported by Billboard in the magazine's September 19, 1970 issue that former Juan y Junior member Juan Pardo, a Novola artist had made his first concert appearance as a solo artist.

In December 1974, Pardo had "Conversasiones Conmigo Mism" on the Latin Hit Parade chart in Spain and "Mr. Guitarra" on the Venezuela chart. He also had his album Conversasiones Conmigo Mism in the album chart.

On the week of September 12, 1981, "No Me Hables" got to no. 8 on the East Coast section of Record World Latin U.S.A. Hit Parade chart. It was also at no. 7 in the West Coast section, and registering the Mexico charts. It entered the German charts on 29 November 1981. Spending a total of ten weeks in the chart, it peaked at no. 3. It was also a hit in other countries including Czechoslovakia, the Netherlands and Belgium.

During the week of March 6, 1993, Pardo's album, Sinceramente Juan entered the Music & Media Europe Top 100 Albums chart at no. 44.

== Later years ==
He recorded the album, "Lúa chea", which was released in 2003.

== See also ==
- List of best-selling Latin music artists
