= Maria Kazakova (figure skater) =

Russian-Georgian ice dancer (born 2001)

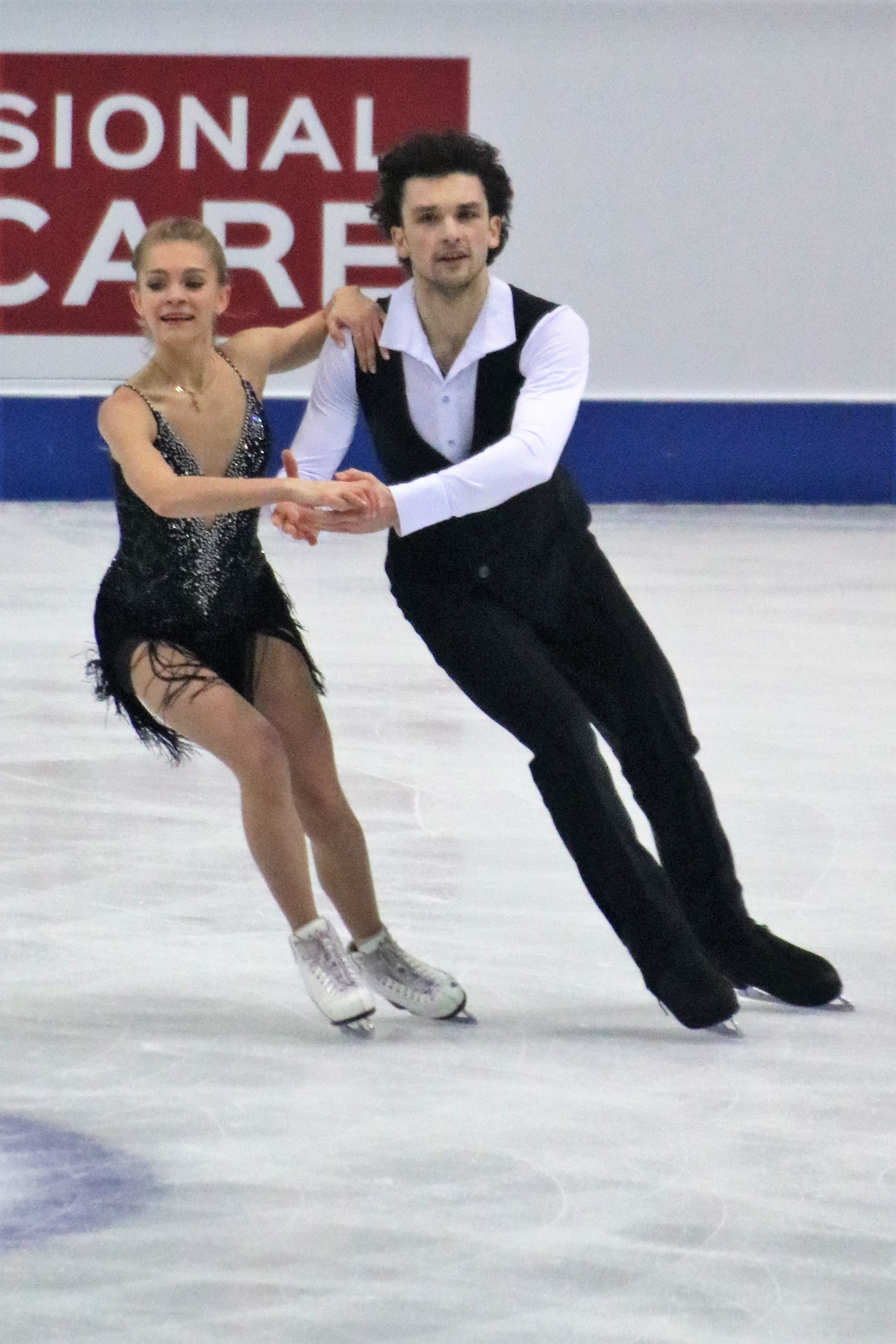
- Kazakova/Reviya at the 2019–20 Junior Grand Prix Final

Personal information
- Native name: Мария Евгеньевна Казакова
- Full name: Maria Evgenyevna Kazakova
- Born: 15 July 2001 (age 25) Moscow, Russia
- Home town: Tbilisi, Georgia
- Height: 1.60 m (5 ft 3 in)

Figure skating career
- Country: (Georgia (country)) Georgia
- Partner: Vladislav Kasinskij (since 2025); Georgy Reviya (2017–24); Aleksandr Vaskovich (2014–17)
- Coach: Matteo Zanni; Barbora Řezníčková
- Skating club: Balashikha SC
- Began skating: 2005
Medal record
Representing Georgia
Figure skating: Ice dance
World Junior Championships
| Silver medal – second place | 2020 Tallinn | Ice dance |
Junior Grand Prix Final
| Gold medal – first place | 2019–20 Turin | Ice dance |

Maria Evgenyevna Kazakova (Russian: Мария Евгеньевна Казакова, Georgian: მარია ევგენიევნა კაზაკოვა, born 15 July 2001) is a Russian-Georgian ice dancer who competes for Georgia. With her former partner, Georgy Reviya, she is a three-time ISU Challenger Series bronze medalist.

On the junior level, she is the 2020 World Junior silver medalist, the 2019 Junior Grand Prix Final champion, the 2019 JGP Croatia champion, the 2018 Toruń Cup champion, the 2019 NRW Trophy champion and the 2018 Volvo Open Cup champion.

== Personal life ==
Kazakova was born on 15 July 2001 in Moscow, Russia. She holds dual Russian and Georgian citizenship. Kazakova currently studies ballet at the Russian Institute of Theatre Arts, in addition to coaching pedagogy at the Russian State University of Physical Education, Sport, Youth and Tourism.

== Career ==
=== Early years ===
Kazakova began learning to skate in 2005 at the age of four. Competing with Aleksandr Vaskovich for Russia, she placed tenth in junior ice dancing at the 2016 Ice Star in Belarus.

=== Partnership with Reviya ===
==== 2017–2018 season ====
In 2017, Kazakova teamed up with Georgy Reviya to compete for Georgia. During the 2017–2018 season, the team appeared at four international events – the Toruń Cup, the Golden Spin of Zagreb, the Santa Claus Cup, and the Tallinn Trophy. In March, they placed ninth at the 2018 World Junior Championships in Sofia, Bulgaria.

==== 2018–2019 season ====
Kazakova/Reviya made their ISU Junior Grand Prix (JGP) debut in September at the 2018 JGP Czech Republic. They finished second in both the rhythm dance and the free dance to earn the silver medal overall behind Russian gold medalists Elizaveta Khudaiberdieva / Nikita Nazarov and ahead of Russian bronze medalists Davis/Smolkin.

At their next Junior Grand Prix event, in Armenia, Kazakova/Reviya placed second in both segments, behind Russia's Ushakova/Nekrasov, and received another silver medal. They set a new personal best score of 65.42 in the rhythm dance. They became the first ice dancers representing Georgia to qualify to a Junior Grand Prix Final, where they finished sixth.

Kazakova/Reviya concluded the season at the 2019 World Junior Championships, where they placed sixth. Reviya called their performance there "not our season’s best, but the best skate of the season. There were some technical mistakes, and we’ll work on them, but I’m happy my partner and I are moving in the right direction."

==== 2019–2020 season: Senior debut and World Junior silver medalists ====
Kazakova/Reviya began their season in early September at the 2019 JGP Latvia. Though they won the free dance at this event by a little under two points, they placed second overall behind the Russian team and training mates Khudaiberdieva/ Filatov by about 0.3 points after being at a deficit after the rhythm dance. Despite missing gold, the team set new personal bests in the free dance and overall at the event. At their second assignment, 2019 JGP Croatia, Kazakova/Reviya earned their first Junior Grand Prix title, taking first place by a 15-point margin over Russian silver medalists Tyutyunina/Shustitskiy. The team set new personal bests in both the rhythm dance and the free dance as well as overall, and with their win qualified for the Junior Grand Prix Final for the second season in a row.

Kazakova/Reviya made their senior international debut in early November 2019 at the 2019 CS Asian Open Figure Skating Trophy. The team placed third in the rhythm dance and second in the free dance to finish third overall behind the American team Carreira/Ponomarenko and Russian team (including Reviya's former partner) Konkina/Drozd. The pair also set new personal bests in all three segments at the event. Days later, Kazakova/Reviya competed in the senior category again at the 2019 Volvo Open Cup in Riga, Latvia. They placed second in both the rhythm dance and the free dance behind the Russian team Shevchenko/Eremenko to win the silver medal overall.

In December 2019, Kazakova/Reviya returned to the junior level to compete at the 2019–20 Junior Grand Prix Final in Turin, Italy. The team took the lead in the rhythm dance by just a 0.04 point margin over the American team Nguyen/Kolesnik and again set a new personal best (68.76). After their performance, Reviya remarked, "It wasn't easy today. We are very happy with our marks, but not so happy with the skate," citing a few minor technical errors that the team will look to work on moving forward. On splitting their season between the junior and senior circuit, Reviya further added, "It's hard, so hard! But the free dance in juniors is easier after skating in seniors." During the following day of competition, Kazakova/Reviya continued their momentum from the rhythm dance by placing first in the free dance by a 0.12 point margin over the Americans to capture their first Junior Grand Prix Final title. Their win marks the first Junior Grand Prix Final victory by an entrant from Georgia in any discipline. After their win, Kazakova stated, "It's a great pleasure for us just to skate and especially to skate for Georgia."

In January 2020, Kazakova/Reviya competed at the 2020 European Championships, their first senior ISU championship. The team placed twelfth in the rhythm dance, scoring just shy of their personal best score and qualifying to the free dance. The couple fell to fourteenth place in the free dance and ultimately ranked fourteenth overall.

Kazakova/Reviya next competed in early March 2020 at the 2020 World Junior Figure Skating Championships in Tallinn, Estonia. The team set a new personal best in the rhythm dance and finished second in the segment behind Russian team Shanaeva/Naryzhnyy and ahead of American rivals Nguyen/Kolesnik. In the free dance, Kazakova/Reviya outscored Shanaeva/Naryzhnyy, but were overtaken by Nguyen/Kolesnik, leaving the team once again in second in the segment and second overall. Their silver medal marks Georgia's first ISU championship medal in ice dance.

They had been assigned to make their senior World Championship debut in Montreal, but these were cancelled as a result of the coronavirus pandemic.

==== 2020–2021 season ====
Kazakova/Reviya were assigned to make their Grand Prix debut at the 2020 Rostelecom Cup, but withdrew. Later in the season, the team was assigned to the 2021 World Championships, but withdrew prior to the publication of the entry list due to health issues.

==== 2021–2022 season: Beijing Olympics ====
Kazakova/Reviya returned to competition after a season away due to injury at the 2021 CS Nebelhorn Trophy, attempting to qualify a berth for Georgia in ice dance at the 2022 Winter Olympics. They placed fifth in the rhythm dance due primarily to a mistake made by Reviya on their third set of twizzles but were able to remain in contention for Olympic qualification. In the free dance, Kazakova/Reviya came back with a stronger performance to finish second in the segment, scoring just shy of their personal best and finishing third overall to successfully qualify for a spot in their discipline for Georgia at the Olympic Games.

At their next assignment, the 2021 Mezzaluna Cup, Kazakova/Reviya placed first in both segments of competition to take the title by a 15-point margin over Australian silver medalists Kerry/Dodds. They were scheduled to compete at the 2021 CS Cup of Austria, the 2021 CS Warsaw Cup, and the 2021 Rostelecom Cup, but withdrew from all three events due to injury. Due to equipment issues, the team also skipped the 2022 European Championships in January.

Kazakova/Reviya began the 2022 Winter Olympics as the Georgian entrant in the rhythm dance segment of the Olympic team event. They placed eighth in the segment, taking three points for the Georgian team. Ultimately the team did not advance to the second phase of the competition and finished sixth. In the dance event, Kazakova/Reviya were eighteenth in the rhythm dance, qualifying for the free dance. Nineteenth in the free dance, they finished nineteenth overall.

The team concluded the season at the 2022 World Championships, held in Montpellier with Russian dance teams absent due to the International Skating Union banning all Russian athletes due to their country's invasion of Ukraine. They finished fifteenth.

Following the season, Kazakova/Reviya relocated to Bolzano, Italy to train with Matteo Zanni, Barbora Řezníčková, and Denis Lodola becoming their new coaching team.

==== 2022–2023 season ====
Before the start of the 2022–23 season, Kazakova and Reviya left Russia and long-time coaches Denis Samokhin and Maria Borovikova and relocated to Egna, Italy to train under Matteo Zanni and Barbora Řezníčková. They said that training outside Russia would be beneficial in light of the ongoing invasion of Ukraine.

Kazakova broke her hand in the preseason, resulting in them missing two months of training and having to withdraw from two early events. Kazakova/Reviya opened their season by making their ISU Grand Prix debut at the 2022 Grand Prix de France in November. They placed sixth in both the rhythm and free dance to finish sixth overall. They were sixth as well at the 2022 MK John Wilson Trophy the following weekend.

In their second appearance at the European Championships, Kazakova/Reviya finished eighth. They came in thirteenth at the 2023 World Championships.

==== 2023–2024 season ====
Kazakova/Reviya won the bronze medal at the 2023 CS Lombardia Trophy to start the competitive season, before finishing sixth at the 2023 CS Nebelhorn Trophy. On the Grand Prix, they were seventh at the 2023 Cup of China. Reviya said they were happy with their performance, noting that his "health condition is not that good."

In April, Kazkova announced that she and Reviya had split.

=== Partnership with Kasinskij ===
==== 2025–2026 season ====
In August 2025, it was announced that Kazakova had teamed up with Vladislav Kasinskij, who previously represented Bosnia and Herzegovina with his former partner. It was also reported that the team would train in Egna, Italy under coaches, Matteo Zanni and Barbora Řezníčková.

== Programs ==
=== With Kasinskij ===
| Season | Rhythm dance | Free dance |
|---|---|---|
| 2025–2026 | Believe; All or Nothing; Strong Enough by Cher | Life Is Beautiful; Buongiorno Principessa by Nicola Piovani; Beautiful That Way by Noa; Buongiorno Principessa performed by Luigi Piovano & Archi di Santa Cecilia; Arriva il Carro Armato; Buongiorno Principessa by Nicola Piovani |

=== With Reviya ===
| Season | Rhythm dance | Free dance | Exhibition |
|---|---|---|---|
| 2023–2024 | A Kind of Magic; Save Me; I Want to Break Free; Need Your Loving Tonight by Queen choreo. by Matteo Zanni | Schindler's List by John Williams choreo. by Matteo Zanni | |
| 2022–2023 | Samba: Squid Samba by Alessandro Olivato; Rhumba: Hello by Adele; Samba: 1 to 8 by Brian Sessarego choreo. by Matteo Zanni | Mad World by Tears for Fears performed by 2WEI, Tommee Profitt, and Fleurie choreo. by Matteo Zanni | Dream by Imagine Dragons |
| 2021–2022 | Blues: Chosen One by Valley of Wolves; Hip Hop: Yeah! by Usher, feat. Lil Jon and Ludacris choreo. by Nikolai Nikonov | Dummy (from Saw II) by Charlie Clouser; Texas Gypsy Massacre; Mephisto's Lullaby by Xtortion Audio choreo. by Nikolai Nikonov | In the End by Linkin Park performed by Tommee Profitt, feat. Fleurie and Jung Youth choreo. by Elena Sokolova |
| 2020–2021 | Did not compete this season | | |
| 2019–2020 | Quickstep: Take Good Care of My Baby (from Beautiful: The Carole King Musical) performed by Jake Epstein and Jessie Mueller; Foxtrot: Dream a Little Dream of Me performed by The Beautiful South; Quickstep: Overture (from Funny Girl) | In the End by Linkin Park performed by Tommee Profitt, feat. Fleurie and Jung Youth choreo. by Elena Sokolova | Gandagan (Georgian Folk Dance) by Cekva Zgaparshi |
| 2018–2019 | Argentine Tango: Building the Bullet by Luis Bacalov; Argentine Tango: Assassin's Tango (from Mr. & Mrs. Smith) by John Powell | Carmina Burana by Carl Orff performed by Edvin Marton; Vocalise (from The Ninth Gate) by Wojciech Kilar | Gandagan (Georgian Folk Dance) by Cekva Zgaparshi |
| | Short dance | | |
| 2017–2018 | Cha Cha: Unchain My Heart performed by Joe Cocker; Rhumba: Abrázame performed by Tamara | A Time For Us (from Romeo and Juliet) arranged by Henry Mancini; Aimer (from Roméo et Juliette) performed by Damian Sargue and Cécelia Cara | |

=== With Vaskovich ===
| Season | Short dance | Free dance |
|---|---|---|
| 2016–2017 | Blues: Clint Eastwood performed by Smooth Jazz All Stars; Swing: | California Dreamin' performed by The Mamas & the Papas; Somebody to Love by Darby Slick performed by Jefferson Airplane |
| 2015–2016 | Waltz: Hedwig's Theme from Harry Potter and the Philosopher's Stone by John Williams; Harry Potter and the Goblet of Fire by Patrick Doyle | Haru Mamburu by Anton Yakomulsky, Igor Lapukhin, Maksim Pokrovsky, and Maksim Likhachev performed by Nogu Svelo!; Little Chinese Bells by Maksim Likhachev performed by Nogu Svelo! |
| 2014–2015 | unknown | Hang Fire by The Rolling Stones performed by James Asher and Sivamani; Earthsong by Karunesh |

== Records and achievements ==
=== Junior world record scores ===
Kazakova/Reviya are the former junior world record holders for the free dance and total scores.

Junior ice dance combined total records
| Date | Score | Event | Note |
|---|---|---|---|
| 7 March 2020 | 176.19 | 2020 World Junior Championships | Surpassed by Avonley Nguyen / Vadym Kolesnik on 7 March 2020. |
Junior ice dance free dance
| Date | Score | Event | Note |
| 7 December 2019 | 106.14 | 2019–20 Junior Grand Prix Final | Surpassed on 7 March 2020. |
| 7 March 2020 | 106.21 | 2020 World Junior Championships | Surpassed by Avonley Nguyen / Vadym Kolesnik on 7 March 2020. |

== Competitive highlights ==
- GP – Event of the ISU Grand Prix Series
- JGP – Event of the ISU Junior Grand Prix Series
- CS – Event of the ISU Challenger Series
- TBD – Assigned
- WD – Withdrew from competition
- C – Event was cancelled
- Medals at team events are awarded for the team results only. Individual placements at team events are listed in parentheses.

=== Ice dance with Vladislav Kasinskij for Georgia ===
Competition placements at senior level
| Season | 2025–26 |
|---|---|
| Europeans | TBD |
| CS Golden Spin of Zagreb | 10th |
| CS Lombardia Trophy | 9th |
| CS Trialeti Trophy | 9th |
| Bosphorus Cup | 3rd |
| EDGE Cup | 3rd |
| Mezzaluna Cup | 8th |
| Skate to Milano | 13th |

=== Ice dance with Georgy Reviya for Georgia ===
International
| Event | 17–18 | 18–19 | 19–20 | 20–21 | 21–22 | 22–23 | 23–24 |
|---|---|---|---|---|---|---|---|
| Olympics | | | | | 19th | | |
| Worlds | | | C | WD | 15th | 13th | |
| Europeans | | | 14th | | WD | 8th | |
| GP Cup of China | | | | | | | 7th |
| GP France | | | | | | 6th | |
| GP NHK Trophy | | | | | | | WD |
| GP Wilson Trophy | | | | | | 6th | |
| CS Asian Open | | | 3rd | | | | |
| CS Finlandia | | | | | | WD | |
| CS Golden Spin | | | | | WD | 5th | |
| CS Lombardia | | | | | | | 3rd |
| CS Nebelhorn | | | | | 3rd | | 6th |
| CS Warsaw Cup | | | | | WD | | |
| Cup of Nice | | | | | | WD | |
| Mezzaluna Cup | | | | | 1st | | |
| NRW Trophy | | | | | | 1st | |
| Volvo Open Cup | | | 2nd | | | | |
International: Junior
| Junior Worlds | 9th | 6th | 2nd | | | | |
| JGP Final | | 6th | 1st | | | | |
| JGP Armenia | | 2nd | | | | | |
| JGP Croatia | | | 1st | | | | |
| JGP Czech Republic | | 2nd | | | | | |
| JGP Latvia | | | 2nd | | | | |
| Golden Spin | 2nd | | | | | | |
| NRW Trophy | | | 1st | | | | |
| Santa Claus Cup | 3rd | | | | | | |
| Tallinn Trophy | 5th | | | | | | |
| Toruń Cup | 1st | | | | | | |
| Volvo Open Cup | | 1st J | | | | | |
Team events
| Olympics | | | | | 6th T 8th P | | |

=== Ice dance with Aleksandr Vaskovich for Russia ===
International: Junior
| Event | 2014–15 | 2015–16 | 2016–17 |
|---|---|---|---|
| Ice Star | | | 10th |
International: Advanced novice
| NRW Trophy | 9th | | |

== Detailed results ==
ISU Personal best in bold. Small medals for short and free programs awarded only at ISU Championships.

=== With Kasinskij ===
{{Figure skating detailed results |season=2025-26|icedance=RD/FD|ref= |Sep 11-14, 2025| (Italy) 2025 CS Lombardia Trophy|10|56.73|10|84.90|9|141.63 |Sep 18-21, 2025| (China) 2025 ISU Skate to Milano|13|59.53|13|89.25|13|148.78 |Nov 24-30, 2025| (Turkey) 2025 Bosphorus Cup|3|65.13|3|100.62|3|165.75 |Dec 3-6, 2025| (Croatia) 2025 CS Golden Spin of Zagreb|9|61.37|10|94.71|10|156.08 |Jan 27 - Feb 1, 2026| (Poland) 2026 EDGE Cup|3|66.63|5|97.52|3|164.15 ))

=== With Reviya ===
==== Senior results ====
**2023–2024 season**
| Date | Event | RD | FD | Total |
| November 10–12, 2023 | 2023 Cup of China | 6; 70.58 | 6; 108.28 | 7; 178.66 |
| September 20–23, 2023 | 2023 CS Nebelhorn Trophy | 4; 68.68 | 6; 107.15 | 6; 175.83 |
| September 8–10, 2023 | 2023 CS Lombardia Trophy | 3; **70.95** | 4; 110.04 | 3; 180.99 |
**2022–2023 season**
| Date | Event | RD | FD | Total |
| March 22–26, 2023 | 2023 World Championships | 14; 69.43 | 12; **111.79** | 13; **181.22** |
| January 25–29, 2023 | 2023 European Championships | 8; 68.55 | 8; 107.27 | 8; 175.82 |
| December 7–10, 2022 | 2022 CS Golden Spin of Zagreb | 5; 68.84 | 5; 104.59 | 5; 173.43 |
| November 24–27, 2022 | NRW Trophy | 1; 74.73 | 1; 113.65 | 1; 188.38 |
| November 11–13, 2022 | 2022 MK John Wilson Trophy | 6; 70.71 | 5; 106.00 | 6; 176.71 |
| November 4–6, 2022 | 2022 Grand Prix de France | 6; 68.84 | 7; 104.21 | 6; 173.05 |
**2021–2022 season**
| Date | Event | RD | FD | Total |
| March 21–27, 2022 | 2022 World Championships | 17; 66.76 | 15; 98.62 | 15; 165.38 |
| February 12–14, 2022 | 2022 Winter Olympics | 18; 67.08 | 19; 97.25 | 19; 164.33 |
| February 4–7, 2022 | 2022 Winter Olympics – Team event | 8; 64.60 | — | 6T |
| October 15–17, 2021 | 2021 Mezzaluna Cup | 1; 74.98 | 1; 111.80 | 1; 186.78 |
| September 22–25, 2021 | 2021 CS Nebelhorn Trophy | 5; 66.95 | 2; 106.25 | 3; 173.20 |

==== Junior results ====
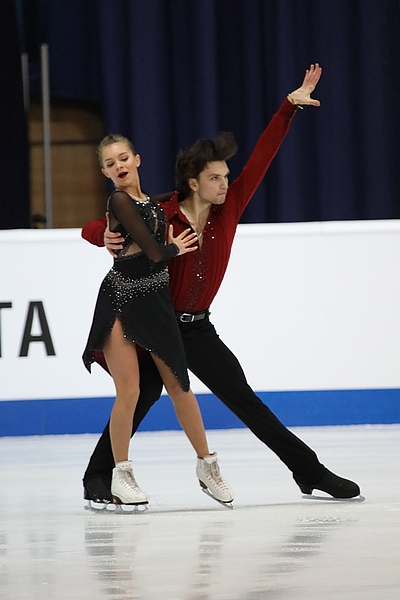
Kazakova/Reviya at the 2019 World Junior Championships

**2019–2020 season**
| Date | Event | Level | RD | FD | Total |
| 2–8 March 2020 | 2020 World Junior Championships | Junior | 2; 69.98 | 2; 106.21 | 2; 176.19 |
| 20–26 January 2020 | 2020 European Championships | Senior | 12; 67.49 | 14; 99.73 | 14; 167.22 |
| 5–8 December 2019 | 2019–20 Junior Grand Prix Final | Junior | 1; 68.76 | 1; 106.14 | 1; 174.90 |
| 5–10 November 2019 | 2019 Volvo Open Cup | Senior | 2; 69.95 | 2; 112.48 | 2; 182.43 |
| 30 Oct. – 3 Nov. 2019 | 2019 CS Asian Open Trophy | Senior | 3; 67.68 | 2; **106.95** | 3; 174.63 |
| 25–28 September 2019 | 2019 JGP Croatia | Junior | 1; 65.97 | 1; 103.25 | 1; 169.22 |
| 4–7 September 2019 | 2019 JGP Latvia | Junior | 2; 63.25 | 1; 102.01 | 2; 165.26 |
| 9–11 August 2019 | 2019 NRW Summer Trophy | Junior | 1; 59.13 | 1; 93.95 | 1; 153.08 |
**2018–2019 season**
| Date | Event | Level | RD | FD | Total |
| 18–24 March 2019 | 2019 World Junior Championships | Junior | 6; 60.08 | 6; 95.32 | 6; 155.40 |
| 6–9 December 2018 | 2018–19 Junior Grand Prix Final | Junior | 6; 57.51 | 6; 91.25 | 6; 148.76 |
| 7–11 November 2018 | 2018 Volvo Open Cup | Junior | 1; 67.04 | 1; 100.26 | 1; 167.30 |
| 10–13 October 2018 | 2018 JGP Armenia | Junior | 2; 65.42 | 2; 99.23 | 2; 164.65 |
| 26–29 September 2018 | 2018 JGP Czech Republic | Junior | 2; 59.77 | 2; 94.40 | 2; 154.17 |
**2017–2018 season**
| Date | Event | Level | SD | FD | Total |
| 5–11 March 2018 | 2018 World Junior Championships | Junior | 11; 54.95 | 8; 78.12 | 9; 133.07 |
| 30 Jan. – 4 Feb. 2018 | 2018 Toruń Cup | Junior | 1; 56.44 | 1; 75.63 | 1; 132.07 |
| 6–9 December 2017 | 2017 Golden Spin of Zagreb | Junior | 2; 58.70 | 2; 79.02 | 2; 137.72 |
| 4–10 December 2017 | 2017 Santa Claus Cup | Junior | 4; 52.44 | 3; 75.15 | 3; 127.59 |
| 20–26 November 2017 | 2017 Tallinn Trophy | Junior | 4; 54.86 | 8; 70.10 | 5; 124.96 |

World Junior Record Holders
| Preceded by (Canada) Marjorie Lajoie / Zachary Lagha | Junior Free Dance; 7 December 2019 – 7 March 2020 | Succeeded by (United States) Avonley Nguyen / Vadym Kolesnik |
| Preceded by (Canada) Marjorie Lajoie / Zachary Lagha | Junior Total Score; 7 March 2020 | Succeeded by (United States) Avonley Nguyen / Vadym Kolesnik |
