= Ukraine (song) =

"Украина"

Single by Nogu Svelo!
- Released: 12 June 2022
- Recorded: 2022
- Length: 4:03
- Label: Max Incubator
- Songwriter: Maxim Pokrovskiy

Nogu Svelo! singles chronology
"Назад, Россия!" (2022)	"Украина" (2022)

Music video
- "Украина" on YouTube

"Ukraine" is a 2022 song by Russian rock band Nogu Svelo!. The song was released on 12 June 2022 on Russia Day to voice the band's opposition of the 2022 Russian invasion of Ukraine.

== Release ==
The song was released on 12 June 2022 on major streaming platforms, the same day as Russia Day. On the day of the song's release, Nogu Svelo! frontman Maxim Pokrovskiy released a statement on his Instagram page, saying "For the previous 34 years of our existence, we have walked difficult paths so that now, at this point, at this particular moment in time, this particular song will be born. What will happen to us with all of us, only God knows. We only know that everything will be fine with Ukraine."

== Production ==
Production for the music video was directed by Alex Musin. The video was filmed in the United States, near the border of states New Jersey and Pennsylvania in a location that Musin thought looked familiar in terms of landscape to Ukraine. Many actors of the music video were unpaid volunteers from Ukraine who wanted to appear in the video.

== Composition ==
In the beginning of the song, Pokrovskiy talks to his son and daughter, saying to them that he promises that Ukraine will win the Russian invasion of Ukraine. He also hopes in the video that the Ukrainian cities of Kyiv, Mariupol, Odesa, Kharkiv, and Bucha will recover soon from Russian attacks.

== Music video ==
Along with the song's release on streaming platforms, a music video was made to accompany the release. In the video, Maxim Pokrovskiy is shown wearing a blouse and acting as a father. He is shown comforting his son and daughter during an air raid, promising that the raid will be over soon and that Ukraine will win the invasion.
