= The Castilian =

- Theatrical release poster
- Directed by: Javier Setó
- Written by: Paulino Rodrigo; Luis de los Arcos; Javier Setó
- Screenplay by: Paulino Rodrigo; Luis de los Arcos; Javier Setó
- Based on: Poema de Fernán González
- Produced by: Sidney W. Pink
- Starring: Cesar Romero; Frankie Avalon
- Cinematography: Mario Pacheco
- Edited by: Richard Mayer; Margarita de Ochoa
- Music by: José Buenagú
- Production company: Producciones Cinematográficas M.D. S.L.
- Distributed by: Warner Bros. Pictures (USA)
- Release date: September 6, 1963
- Running time: 120 minutes
- Countries: Spain; USA
- Language: English
- Budget: over $1 million or $1.6 million

The Castilian (in Spanish El valle de las espadas) is a 1963 independently made historical action film drama in Eastmancolor, produced by Sidney W. Pink, directed by Javier Setó, that stars Cesar Romero, Frankie Avalon, Broderick Crawford, Alida Valli, Espartaco Santoni, Tere Velázquez, Fernando Rey, and Soledad Miranda. The Castilian was distributed in the U.S. by Warner Bros. Pictures.

The film's storyline concerns Fernán González, the first independent count of Castile, who lived and ruled in the early 10th century.

== Plot ==
Don Sancho is a despotic 10th-century king who, in league with the Moors, has banished handsome nobleman Fernán González. With the surreptitious aid of Don Sancho's daughter, Sancha, Fernán González assembles an army to march against the Moors.

== Cast ==
- Cesar Romero as Jerónimo
- Frankie Avalon as Jerifán
- Broderick Crawford as Don Sancho
- Alida Valli as Reina Teresa
- Espartaco Santoni as Fernán González
- Tere Velázquez as Sancha
- Fernando Rey as Ramiro II of León
- Soledad Miranda as Maria Estevez

== Production ==
The film was developed by Espartaco Santoni who was married to actress Marujita Díaz. They wanted to make a Spanish film that would have international appeal in the vein of El Cid. Sidney J. Pink became involved in the production; he disliked Santoni but admired an associate producer Emiliano Piedra. The script was called El Vallde de Las Espadas or The Valley of the Swords. Luis de los Arcos wrote it with Javier Setó, who directed. Pink agreed to make the film.

Pink called the original script "over-long, verbose, dull work... its characters were boring, the perfect example of the Spanish movie industry's inability to comprehend international tastes. Spanish writers believed a hundred words were better than one picture, and so they talked away about the battles that were going to be fought. The script included only one battle scene, and while that one could be spectacular, it took place at the very end." However he liked the story as "it was, in essence, David and Goliath all over again, and its hero was potentially fascianating."

Pink arranged for a deal to be done with Warner Bros who would distribute in the US and some countries. Several roles were earmarked for American stars. These wound up being played by Cesar Romero, Broderick Crawford and Frankie Avalon. Pink hired Avalon to play the balladeer who would be used to help explain the plot. The producer says Avalon's manager Bob Marcucci agreed to his client making the movie "providing Marcucci had exclusive right to compose a title song and possibly two more songs for the picture." Santoni insisted on playing the lead although Pink claims "we had a real shot at getting Paul Newman".

The film was known during production as The Valley of the Swords. Linda Darnell was supposed to star in the film but had to bow out and was replaced by Alida Valli.

According to Pink, director Seto "had no real talent, [but] he was a great student of the cinema. He was earnest and completely dedicated... he was willing and most eager to learn, but he had one miserable failing: If he disagreed with you, he no longer heard you. Most of the time that he worked with us he attempted to understand what we needed and cooperated, but when he felt his Spanish pride and machismo challenged, he became as stubborn as Sancho Panza's donkey." Pink says Seto directed the drama scenes but had to be replaced for the action scenes as the director was not up to it. He wrote "Frankie's scenes turned out exceedingly well; Seto was content to let us control the way Frankie was presented."

Pink says Teresa Vasquez was cast at the behest of Santoni who wanted to sleep with her. (He succeeded, and he left his wife for her.)

All of film's exteriors were shot in Burgos, Berlanga de Duero (Soria), and Peñafiel (Valladolid). Filming took nineteen weeks and Pink says it was difficult due to the inexperience of the crew working on such a large production and the bad behavior of Santoni.

== Release ==
=== Box office ===
Warner Bros asked for the film to be retitled The Castilian. Pink says "The picture never did as well in the U.S. as it did where it played under another title." The producer claims the film was Warners second-highest-grossing film in Latin America at the time (after Giant) and "was a huge success" in the British Commonwealth and Spain.

=== Critical ===
Filmink wrote "Avalon's character performs no real function: he's a strolling balladeer, which is at least different (and helps explain the story). The Castilian has impressive production values and it's worth a look if you liked El Cid and are into dramatisations of Spanish history."

== Comic book adaption ==
- Dell Movie Classic: The Castilian (January 1964)

== See also ==
- List of historical drama films

== Notes ==
- Pink, Sidney (1989). So you want to make movies : my life as an independent film producer.
