= Generation Z (disambiguation) =

Generation Z is the demographic cohort born between approximately 1997 and 2012.

Generation Z or Gen Z may also refer to:

- "Generation Z" (song), a 2022 song by Nogu Svelo!
- Generation Z (album), a 2017 album by Bars and Melody
- Generation Z (TV series), a 2024 British comedy horror television miniseries
- Gen-Z (consortium), a trade group of computer technology vendors

== See also ==
- Gen Z stare, a social phenomenon discussed in the media in year 2025
- Gen Z protests, worldwide series of protests in the 2020s
- Pernikahan Dini Gen Z, an Indonesian television series
- Zorro: Generation Z, a 2006 animated series
