= Rafael Farina =

Spanish flamenco singer

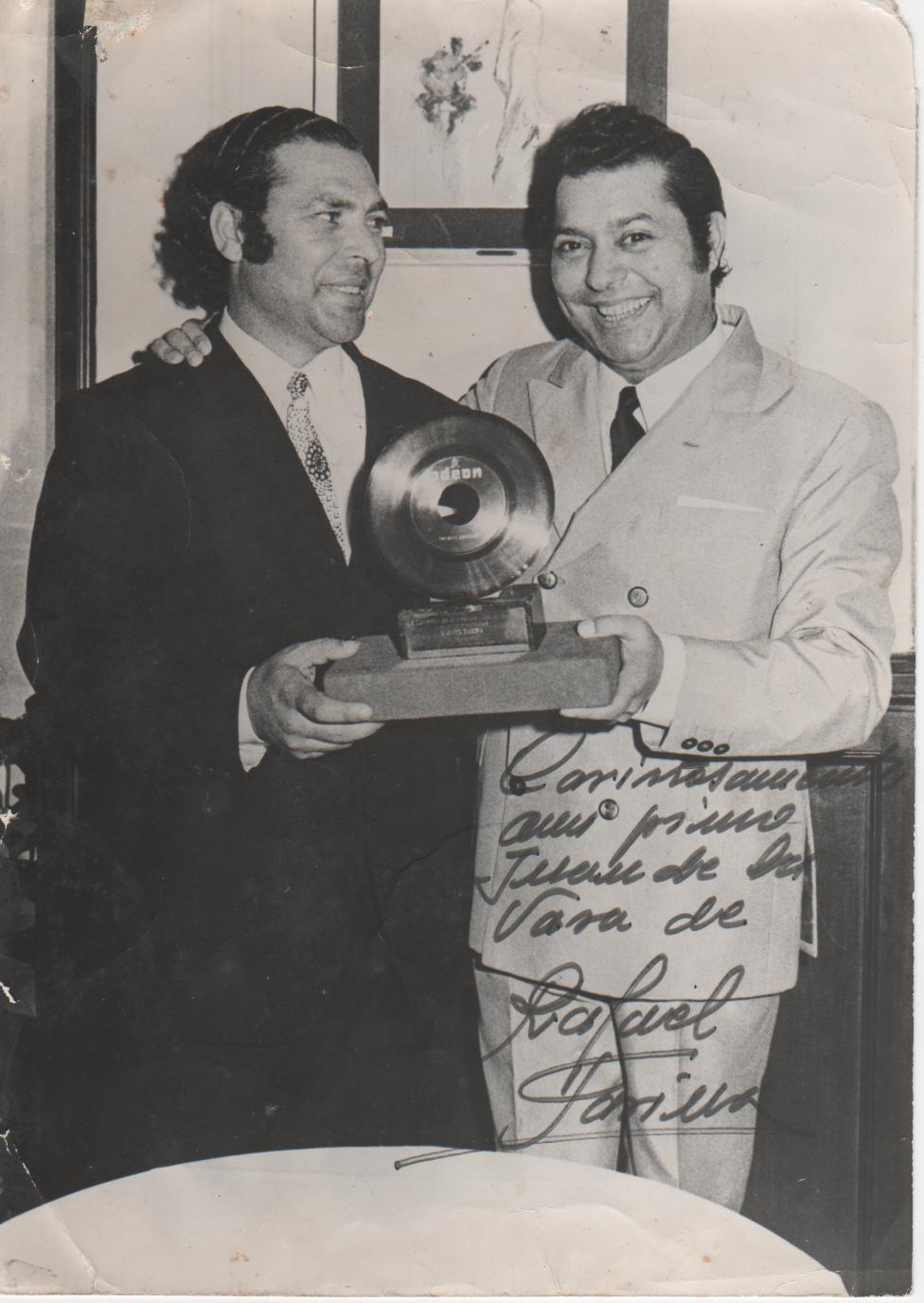
- Rafael Farina with cousin Juan de la Vara

Background information
- Born: Rafael Antonio Salazar Motos; June 2, 1923; Martinamor, Spain
- Origin: Salamanca, Spain
- Died: November 21, 1995 (aged 72) Salamanca, Spain
- Genres: Copla, Flamenco
- Occupations: Singer; Actor
- Instrument: Vocals
- Years active: 1930s–1990s
- Label: Various

Rafael Antonio Salazar Motos (2 June 1923 - 21 November 1995), commonly known as Rafael Farina (Rafael Salazar for his composing work), was a singer of Copla and Flamenco. His granddaughter is the pop-singer Tamara and his nephew is the singer Diego el Cigala.

== Biography ==
Farina was born in Martinamor, into a Romani family, his father, Antonio Salazar Motos, was a cattle dealer, in Alba de Tormes, Martinamor; his mother was Jesusa Motos. He began his career at the age of six singing in the bars of Barrio Chino in Salamanca, accompanied by his older brother, Rafael Salazar Motos, Calderas de Salamanca, also a singer. In 1949 he obtained some fame participating in a tribute to Juanito Mojama. Previously, he had performed at El Colmao. After joining the company of Concha Piquer, he was able to go on tour throughout Spain and America. In 1952 he participated in the revival of the play "La copla andaluza" at the Pavón Theater in Madrid. In 1956 he managed to premiere his own show and in 1968 he worked with Lola Flores at Arte Español.

== Acting career ==
Farina starred in six Spanish and one Argentinian film:

- Café cantante (1951) with Imperio Argentina
- Aventura para dos (1958), with Carmen Sevilla
- La copla andaluza (1959)
- Café de chinitas (1960), with Antonio Molina
- Puente de coplas (1965), also with Antonio Molina
- El milagro del cante (1967), with El Príncipe Gitano, Luis Sánchez Polack
- Canciones de nuestra vida (1975)

== Discography ==
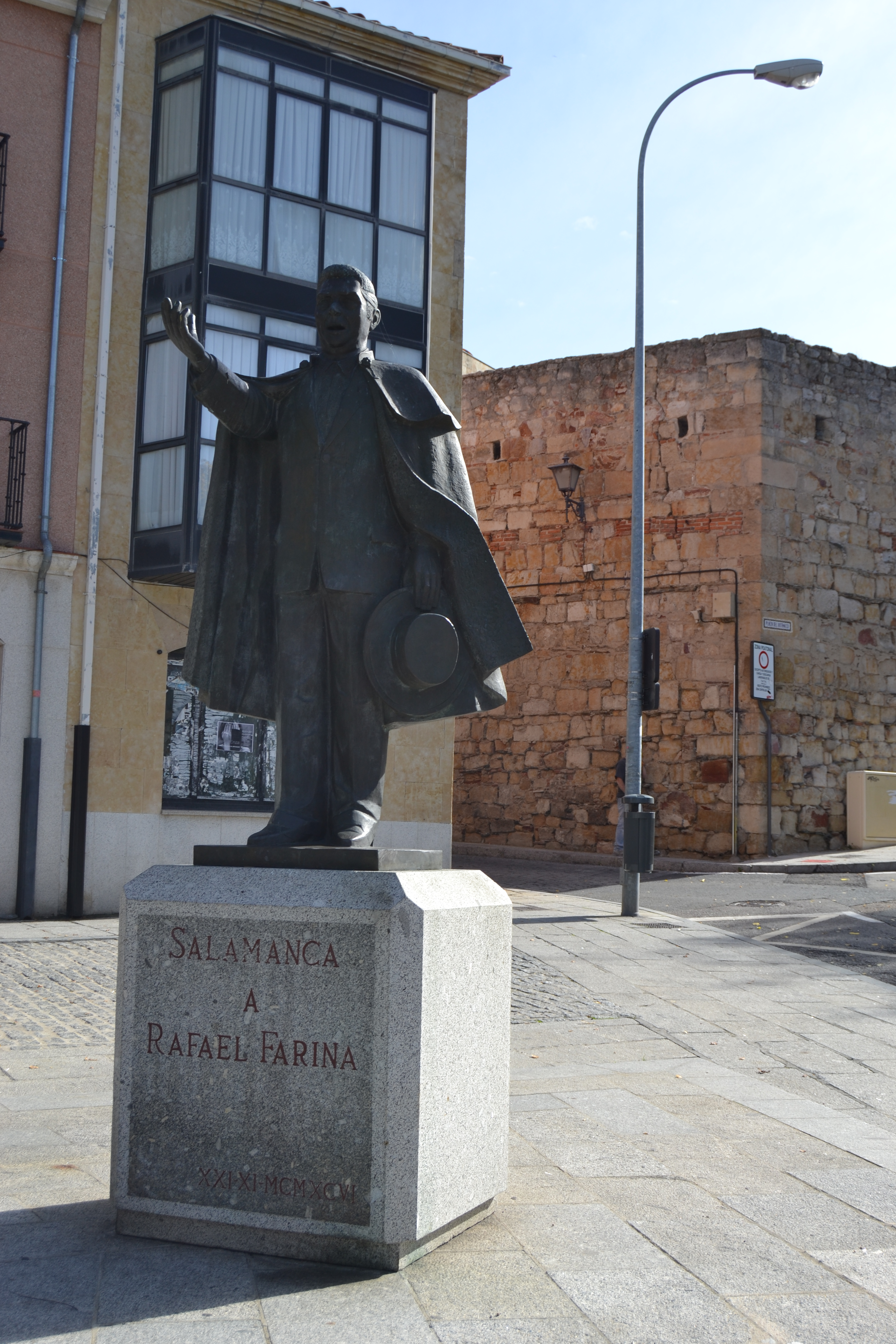
Monument to Rafael Farina in the Barrio Chino district of Salamanca

Some of the best known songs popularized by Rafael Farina include:

- Mi Salamanca
- Twist del faraón
- A Barcelona llegan los olés
- Tientos del Reloj
- Que no te olvido un momento
- No echarle más tierra santa
- Mi corazón dice, dice
- Los iguales para hoy
- Las Campanas de Linares
- Sendas del Viento
- Tesoro de coplas
- Un fandango informativo
- Como las piedras
- Por Dios que me vuelvo loco
- Caminito del olvido
- Piensa ser buena y honrá
- Mi perro amigo
- Dinero y Riquezas
- Aurora
- Que doblen las campanas
- Nana de Jerez
- Vino amargo

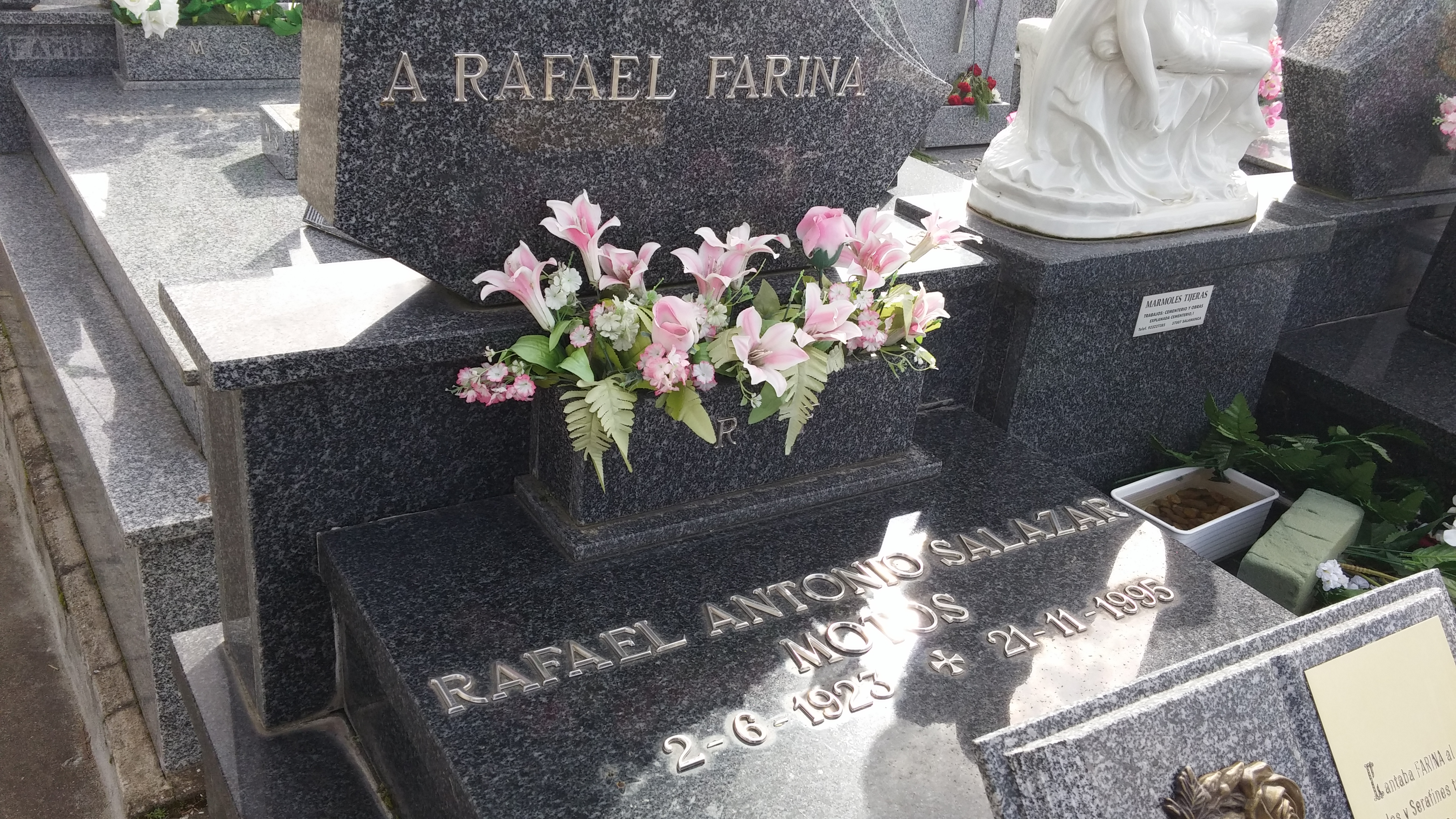
Rafael Farina's grave in the Salamanca cemetery

== Death ==
Rafael Farina died in Madrid on November 21, 1995, at the age of 72, as a result of a myocardial infarction, after undergoing an open heart surgery at the Nuestra Señora de América Clinic in Madrid.

== Sources ==
- Billboard. United States, Billboard Publishing Company, 1975.
- Jeffery, Keith. The Secret History of MI6. United States, Penguin Press, 2011.
- Ni Shuinear, Sinead, and Leblon, Bernard. Gypsies and Flamenco: The Emergence of the Art of Flamenco in Andalusia. United Kingdom, University of Hertfordshire Press, 2003.
- Fernandez, Manuela Rosado. El Flamenco Vive en Madrid. United States, Palibrio, 2013.
- Screen World. United States, Crown Publishers, 1959.
- Pohren, D. E.. Lives and Legends of Flamenco: A Biographical History. Spain, Society of Spanish Studies; [distribution: H. Howell, La Mesa, Calif., 1964. ISBN 9781463347550
- Filmfacts. United States, n.p, 1958.
- Lorente Rivas, Manuel. Etnografía antropológica del flamenco en Granada. Spain, Universidad de Granada, 2007.
- Gómez, Agustín. De Silverio al "flamenglish": (escuelas del cante). Spain, Universidad de Córdoba, 2004. ISBN 9788478017355
- Santamarina, Antonio, and Heredero, Carlos F.. Biblioteca del cine español: fuentes literarias 1900–2005. Spain, Cátedra, 2010. ISBN 9788437626543
- Burgos, Antonio. Juanito Valderrama: Mi España querida. Spain, Esfera de los Libros, 2002. ISBN 9788497340366
- Lorente Rivas, Manuel. Etnografía antropológica del flamenco en Granada. Spain, Universidad de Granada, 2007.ISBN 9788433839947
