= Rafael Salazar =

Rafael Salazar may refer to:

- Rafa Salazar, Colombian drug dealer
- Rafael Salazar Alonso, Spanish lawyer, newspaper proprietor and politician

== See also ==
- Rafael Salazar Motos, Spanish singer
