= Antonio Mateos =

Set decorator

- Occupation: Set decorator
- Years active: 1954–2000

Antonio Mateos is a set decorator. He won an Academy Award in the category Best Art Direction for the film Patton.

== Selected filmography ==
- The Christ of the Lanterns (1958)
- Red Cross Girls (1958)
- Marisol rumbo a Rio (1963)
- El Verdugo (1963)
- Patton (1970)
- La estanquera de Vallecas (1987)
- Familia (1996)
