= Chinitas's Cafe =

1960 film

- Directed by: Gonzalo Delgrás
- Written by: Gonzalo Delgrás
- Cinematography: Sebastián Perera
- Edited by: Pedro del Rey
- Music by: Daniel Montorio
- Production company: Estela Films
- Distributed by: Exclusivas Floralva Distribución
- Release date: 8 May 1960
- Running time: 80 minutes
- Country: Spain
- Language: Spanish

Chinitas's Cafe (Spanish: Café de Chinitas) is a 1960 Spanish film directed by Gonzalo Delgrás.

== Cast ==
- Frank Braña
- Ricardo Canales
- Manuel de Juan
- Eulália del Pino
- Rafael Farina
- Rafael Hernández
- Delia Luna
- Antonio Molina
- Eva Tusset
- Enrique Ávila

== Bibliography ==
- Bentley, Bernard. A Companion to Spanish Cinema. Boydell & Brewer, 2008.
