= Pelusa =

- Directed by: Javier Setó
- Written by: Luis de los Arcos; José Manuel Iglesias
- Cinematography: Mario Pacheco
- Edited by: Antonio Ramírez de Loaysa
- Music by: Gregorio García Segura; José Padilla
- Production company: M.D. Producciones Cinematográficas
- Distributed by: Nueva Films
- Release date: 23 December 1960
- Running time: 96 minutes
- Country: Spain
- Language: Spanish

Pelusa is a 1960 Spanish musical film directed by Javier Setó.

== Cast ==
- Enrique Benchimol
- Francisco Bernal
- Antoñito Candelas
- Julio Carbayo
- José Clavijo
- José Cordero
- José Luis Díaz
- Marujita Díaz
- Félix Fernández
- Tito García
- Francisco González
- Eduardo Hernández
- Diana Lorys
- Pepita Otero
- Antonio Palacios
- Pedro Pescador
- Mari Luz Real
- Roberto Rey
- Antonio Riquelme
- Viviane Romance
- Rosario Royo
- Eduardo Ruiz
- Espartaco Santoni
- Salvador Soler Marí
- Charo Tabarés
- Ana Berta Tizón
- Gonzalo Zamora

== Bibliography ==
- Àngel Comas. Diccionari de llargmetratges: el cinema a Catalunya durant la Segona República, la Guerra Civil i el franquisme (1930-1975). Cossetània Edicions, 2005.
