= Javier Setó =

Spanish screenwriter and film director (1926–1969)

- Born: 1926; Lérida, Catalonia, Spain
- Died: 1969 (aged 42–43); Madrid, Spain
- Occupations: Writer, Director
- Years active: 1950-1969

Javier Setó (1926–1969) was a Spanish screenwriter and film director.

== Selected filmography ==
- Forbidden Trade (1952) a.k.a. Mercado prohibido
- Bronze and Moon (1953) a.k.a. Bronce y Luna
- Bread, Love and Andalusia (1958)
- Pelusa (1960)
- The Castilian (1963) a.k.a. El valle de las espadas
- The Sweet Sound of Death (1965) a.k.a. La Llamada
- The Drums of Tabu (1966) a.k.a. Tabu: The Virgins of Samoa
- Cry Chicago (1969) a.k.a. Viva America: The Mafia Mob
- Macabre (1969) Aka Viaje a vacio (1969) a.k.a. Shadow of Death

== Bibliography ==
- Bentley, Bernard. A Companion to Spanish Cinema. Boydell & Brewer 2008.
