= Espartaco Santoni =

Venezuelan actor and film producer (1937–1998)

Espartaco Garibaldi Borga Santoni (4 June 1937 – 3 September 1998) was a Venezuelan actor, film producer and hotelier.

== Biography ==
Espartaco Garibaldi Borga Santoni was born in Carúpano, Venezuela, the son of an Italian immigrant. He filmed movies with such screen stars as Stephen Boyd, Analía Gadé and Lucía Bosé.

== Personal life ==
Santoni died six months after his second wife, actress Tere Velázquez with the diagnosis of pancreatic cancer.

== Filmography ==
- La corista (1960)
- Pelusa (1960)
- Canción de arrabal o La cumparsita (1961)
- Abuelita Charlestón (1962)
- Han robado una estrella (1963)
- El valle de las espadas (The Castilian) (1963)
- El escándalo (1964)
- Abajo espera la muerte (1966)
- El misterioso señor Van Eyck (1966)
- El hombre de Caracas (1967)
- Cuernos debajo de la cama (1969)
- Goldface (1969)
- Un dólar para Sartana (1971)
- Su le mani, cadavere! Sei in arresto (1971)
- Las amantes del diablo (1971)
- Mil millones para una rubia (1972)
- Ceremonia sangrienta (1973)
- Pena de muerte (1973)
- Las melancólicas (1974)
- El diablo se lleva a los muertos (1974)
- Torrente, el brazo tonto de la ley (1998)
