= The Fisher of Songs =

- Directed by: Antonio del Amo
- Written by: Antonio Guzmán Merino; Esteban Madruga; Ramón Perelló; Antonio del Amo
- Starring: Marujita Díaz; Tony Leblanc; Antonio Molina
- Cinematography: Juan Mariné
- Edited by: Pepita Orduna
- Production company: Teide P.C.
- Distributed by: Rosa Films
- Release date: 15 February 1954
- Running time: 83 minutes
- Country: Spain
- Language: Spanish

The Fisher of Songs (Spanish: El pescador de coplas) is a 1954 Spanish musical comedy film directed by Antonio del Amo and starring Marujita Díaz, Tony Leblanc and Antonio Molina.

== Plot ==
In the marshes of San Fernando (Cádiz) lives María del Mar (Marujita Díaz) and her spirited brother, between fishing and fishing they dedicate themselves to singing and looking for love.

This was not the first of the many films starring the singer Antonio Molina, who became one of the most sought-after artists of the time, in it he sings, among others, I want to be a matador, María de los Remedios and Mar Blanca are already turning off two stars, Fisherman of couplets, Goodbye to Spain.

== Cast ==
- Marujita Díaz as María del Mar
- Tony Leblanc as Rafa
- Antonio Molina as Juan Ramón
- Manuel Monroy as Miguel
- Vicente Parra as Pretendiente de María del Mar
- Manuel Zarzo as Mauriño
- Luis Moscatelli as Gandul
- Salvador Soler Marí as Don Javier
- Luis Pérez de León as Negociante de barcas
- Aníbal Vela as Don José
- Manuel Arbó as Almirante
- José Franco as Director de escena
- José Prada as Don Paco
- Laura Valenzuela as Secretaria de Don Javier
- Manuel Guitián as Supervisor pesca
- Arturo Marín as Barquero
- Francisco Bernal as Joaquín
- Teófilo Palou as Assistante de Don Javier
- Agustín Rivero
- Lita Norman
- Paul Ellis

== Bibliography ==
- de España, Rafael. Directory of Spanish and Portuguese film-makers and films. Greenwood Press, 1994.
