= The Drums of Tabu =

- VHS cover
- Directed by: Javier Setó
- Written by: Javier Setó; Santiago Moncada
- Produced by: Sidney W. Pink
- Starring: James Philbrook; Seyna Seyn; Francisco Morán; Franco Fantasia; Carlo Tamberlani
- Cinematography: Antonio Modica
- Edited by: Antonio Ramírez
- Music by: Gregorio García Segura
- Distributed by: Troma Entertainment
- Release date: 1966
- Running time: 89 minutes
- Countries: Spain; Italy
- Language: Spanish

The Drums of Tabu (also known as Fugitivos de las islas del sur and Tabu: le vergini di Samoa) is a 1966 adventure film directed by Javier Setó and produced by Sidney W. Pink.

== Premise ==
The story follows a drunk who discovers a Samoan princess washed up on the shore of a beach.

== Cast ==
- James Philbrook
- Seyna Seyn
- Paco Morán
- Franco Fantasia
- Beni Deus

== Release ==
The film was distributed in America by Troma Entertainment.
