= Antón Jiménez =

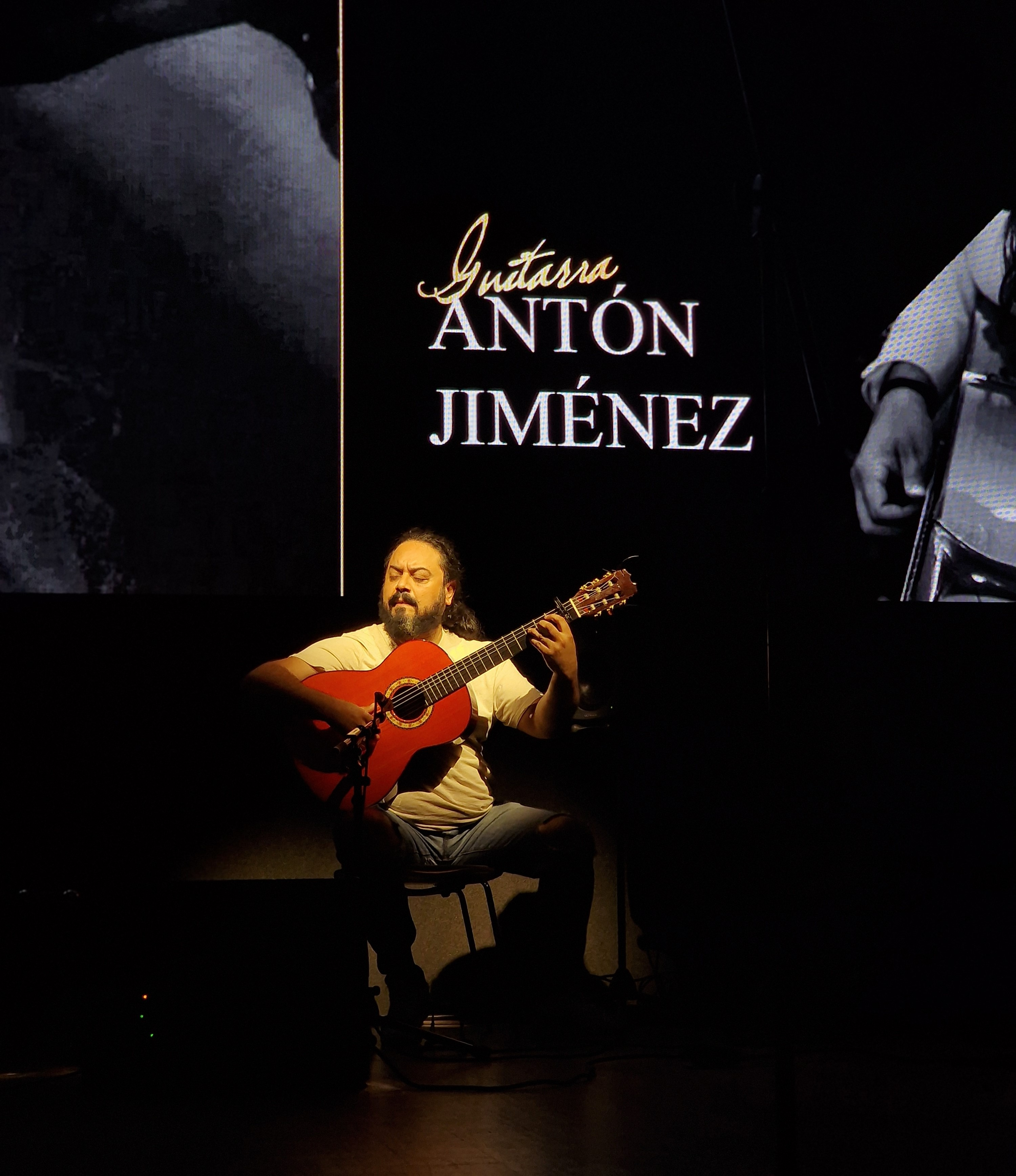

Background information
- Born: Pedro Antonio Giménez Cortés; January 2, 1975 (age 51); Madrid
- Instrument: Guitar

Pedro Antonio Giménez Cortés (Madrid, January 2, 1975), better known as Antón Jiménez, is a Spanish flamenco guitarist and composer. He began and developed his career playing with Diego el Cigala, and Joaquín Cortés, on their international tours. He received the National Guitar Award in 1995, and is an honorary member of the International Music Council CILM - UNESCO. He also collaborated on the album "The New School Of Flamenco Guitar" nominated for the 2003 Latin Grammy Awards. He has also been a composer for the Ballet Nacional de España and the companies of Lola Greco, Rocío Molina, and Rafael Amargo.

== Biography ==
Born in 1975 in Madrid, he is a descendant of the guitarists Ramón Montoya and Mario Escudero. He grew up between the Lavapiés neighborhood in Madrid and Córdoba. In 1988, at the age of 14, he was introduced by Mario Escudero in "Los Veranos de la Villa". At the age of 17 he began composing.

He started and developed his career playing with Diego el Cigala, and Joaquín Cortés in his "Cibayí" and "Pasión Gitana" tours, and during his international trips. He performed, among others, at the Radio City Music Hall in New York, the Universal Amphitheatre in Los Angeles, the Berliner Philharmonie, the Royal Albert Hall in London, the Sydney Opera House, the Luna Park in Buenos Aires and the Tokyo Forum.

Among his collaborations as a guest artist he has played with U2 at the Palau Sant Jordi in Barcelona, and with Vanessa Mae on her album "Storm". Also in 2003 he collaborated with three songs on the album "The New School Of Flamenco Guitar / La Nueva Escuela De La Guitarra Flamenca", produced by Gerardo Núñez, which was eventually nominated for the 2003 Latin Grammy Awards.

In 1995 he played the farruca alongside Joaquín Cortés in Carlos Saura's film Flamenco. Also in 2013 he co-directed and starred in the documentary film Guitarra de Palo, also starring Lola Greco, Raimundo Amador, Jerry González, Jorge Pardo, Javier Colina and Antonio Serrano.
