= Rafael Salazar Motos =

Spanish flamenco singer

Rafael Salazar Motos, better known as the Calderas de Salamanca was a singer (cantaor) of copla and flamenco. He was the brother of fellow singer Rafael Farina, uncle of singer Diego el Cigala and great-uncle of pop-singer Tamara.

== Life and career ==
Motos was born in 1919 at Martinamor, Salamanca into a Salamanca Roma family to Jesusa Motos and Antonio Salaza Motos, was a cattle dealer. He began his career around the age of ten singing in the bars of Salamanca's Chinatown, accompanied by his younger brother, Rafael Farina. The first name of the older brother is Rafael and that of the youngest, Farina, is similar but composed: his name was Rafael Antonio).

He became known in Madrid while acting in Los Gabrieles in 1949, in the tribute or to Juanito Mojama, at the Alcalá Cinema. He was then hired in Concha Piquer's company, which led him traveling for a year in Spain and then to various countries in America. He also worked in the Rafael de Córbova company. He appeared in the inaugural group of the Madrid tablao Las Brujas, in 1960, where he performed on the same stage in 1961, 1964, 1965 and 1966. He used to reside in the Madrid neighborhood of Lavapiés, closely linked to flamenco during that period. He toured with the Antonio Gades ballet in 1961, 1964, 1966, 1967 and 1969; From 1962, he did tours with María Albaicín.

Salazar Motos died in 1986 in Madrid.

== Discography ==
- Rincón de Puerto Real, Tientos (1962)
- Compare This Boat Is Mine (1971)
- Flamenco: Calderas de Salamanca (CPM) (1978)
- Calderas de Salamanca and Rafael Vargas (1978)
- met a man and others (1993, M60)
- Flamenco art: Sabicas / Calderas de Salamanca (1994)
- Farina Brothers Dynasty (1994)
- Designation of origin (1999)
- Atlas of flamenco singing (2011)
- Gypsy flamenco: tangos and bulerías. Vol. 2 (Piros / Dienc)

== Bibliography ==
- Ríos Vargas, Manuel (2002). Signature Editions, ed. Flamenco dance anthology . p. 200.
- Diéguez Gallardo, Fco. (2012). History of a tablao: Las Brujas.
