= The Brave, the Ruthless, the Traitor =

1967 Italian-Spanish film

- Directed by: Juan Xiol Marchal; Edoardo Mulargia
- Release date: 1967
- Countries: Italy; Spain

The Brave, the Ruthless, the Traitors (Italian: Il coraggioso, lo spietato, il traditore) is a 1967 Italian-Spanish film, shot in Technicolor, directed by Juan Xiol Marchal and Edoardo Mulargia (credited as Edward G. Muller). It premiered in theaters in France on 30 June 1971.

== Cast ==
- Espartaco Santoni (as Robert Anthony): Teniente Vargas
- Hélène Chanel: Mujer
- Ángel Álvarez (as Albert Alvarez): Santiago
- Teresa Velázquez: Ingrid
- Ivy Holzer: Mme. Kinsen
- Stephy Palmer
- Manuel Monroy: Mayor Díaz
- Hugo Pimentel: Hans Kinsen
