= The Showgirl =

1960 film by José María Elorrieta

- Directed by: José María Elorrieta
- Written by: José Manuel Iglesias
- Starring: Marujita Díaz; Espartaco Santoni; Luis Sánchez Polack
- Cinematography: Alfonso Nieva
- Edited by: Antonio Gimeno
- Music by: Gregorio García Segura
- Production company: M.D.
- Distributed by: DISCENTRO
- Release date: 30 May 1960
- Running time: 112 minutes
- Country: Spain
- Language: Spanish

The Showgirl (Spanish: La corista) is a 1960 Spanish musical film directed by José María Elorrieta and starring Marujita Díaz, Espartaco Santoni and Luis Sánchez Polack.

== Cast ==
- Marujita Díaz as Marieta
- Espartaco Santoni as Alfredo
- Luis Sánchez Polack as Periodista
- Joaquín Portillo 'Top' as Fotógrafo
- Rafael Corés
- Manolo Gómez Bur as Felipe
- Guadalupe Muñoz Sampedro as Clara
- Paquito Cano as Sebastián
- Félix Fernández as Pulino
- Eduardo Hernández
- Mara Laso as Rosa
- Antonio Molino Rojo
- Julia Pachelo
- Antonio Riquelme as Novio de Rosa
- José María Tasso as Pedro
- José Villasante as Inspector de policía
- Manuel Zarzo

== Bibliography ==
- Crusells, Magi. Directores de cine en Cataluña: de la A a la Z. Edicions Universitat Barcelona, 2009.
