= Women's Town =

- Directed by: Antonio del Amo
- Written by: José María Ochoa; Ramón Perelló; Rafael María Torrecilla; Antonio del Amo; Joaquín Álvarez Quintero (play); Serafín Álvarez Quintero (play)
- Starring: Marujita Díaz; Rubén Rojo
- Cinematography: Juan Mariné
- Edited by: Antonio Gimeno
- Music by: Jesús García Leoz
- Production company: Teide P.C.
- Distributed by: CIFESA
- Release date: 23 March 1953
- Running time: 93 minutes
- Country: Spain
- Language: Spanish

Women's Town (Spanish: Pueblo de las mujeres) is a 1953 Spanish comedy film directed by Antonio del Amo and starring Marujita Díaz and Rubén Rojo.

== Cast ==
- Marujita Díaz
- Milagros Leal
- Carmen Lozano
- Matilde Muñoz Sampedro
- José Prada
- Antonio Riquelme
- Rubén Rojo
- Luisa Sala
- Amparo Soler Leal

== Bibliography ==
- De España, Rafael. Directory of Spanish and Portuguese film-makers and films. Greenwood Press, 1994.
