= Generation Z (song) =

"Поколение Z"

Single by Nogu Svelo!
- Released: 20 April 2022
- Recorded: 2022
- Length: 3:19
- Songwriter: Maxim Pokrovskiy

Nogu Svelo! singles chronology
"Буква zю" (2022)	"Поколение Z" (2022)	"Назад, Россия!" (2022)

Music video
- "Generation Z" on YouTube

"Поколение Z" (romanizing as Pokoleniye Z; known in English as "Generation Z") is a 2022 song by Russian rock band Nogu Svelo!. The song was released on 20 April 2022, in response to the 2022 Russian invasion of Ukraine, condemning actions by Russian army and people during the invasion.

== Background ==
In previous songs, Nogu Svelo! made videos protesting the 2022 Russian invasion of Ukraine, showing destruction caused by the invasion. In a statement from band frontman Maxim Pokrovskiy, he said that "the proportion of people who are sane, according to our estimates, is 65-70%. This, of course, only applies to our audience."

== Composition ==
The lyrics talk about how the Russian government have manage to subdue the Russian people into a "slave mentality", with the people believing increasingly into Russian propaganda, with it becoming so severe that they are "ready to break their teeth for the right to die as slaves". The song later goes on to say that Russia has already lost the war by simply invading Ukraine in the first place. Then, the song lists off Russian controversies that had affected the country in recent years, including the Russian Olympic doping scandal and the Nord Stream 1 gas pipeline. It later goes on to debunk Russian propaganda from state television. The lyrics urge the Russian people to remain humans.

== Music video ==
Along with the release of the song, a music video was released on the same day. In the opening shot, Pokrovskiy burns papers in front of a barrel lit on fire. On the sheets of paper, it's revealed to be propaganda that praises Russia. Comments from Nogu Svelo's social media channels that criticize Pokrovskiy's position on the invasion are also shown. Around two-thirds into the video, a phone conversation between a captured Russian soldier and his mother is played, with the mother in disbelief when the soldier claims that he is not defending his homeland.

== Reaction in Russia ==
On 29 April 2022, Russian TV station Tsargrad TV released an article that condemned both the song and Maxim Pokrovskiy. On 8 June 2022, Russian government had begun performing a background check on Pokrovskiy, on the basis of "discrediting the Armed Forces of the Russian Federation". On the same day, it was found out that a man, Dmitry Sergienko, had filed a report with the Russian police against Pokrovskiy.
