= Diego el Cigala =

Spanish flamenco singer (born 1968)

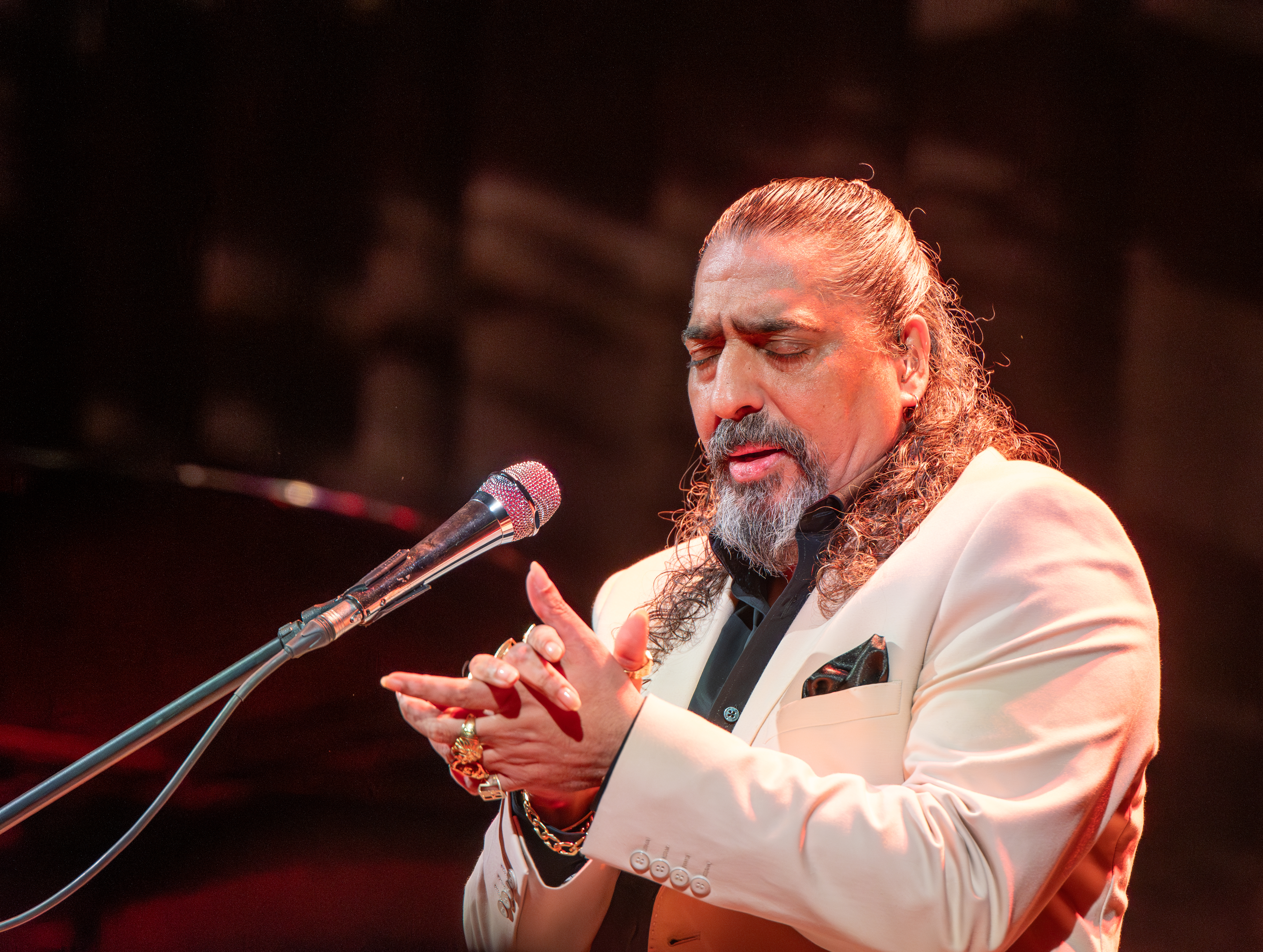
- Diego el Cigala in 2024

Background information
- Born: December 27, 1968 (age 57); Madrid, Spain
- Genre: Flamenco
- Instrument: Vocals

Diego Ramón Jiménez Salazar (born 27 December 1968 in Madrid), known as El Cigala (Castilian for 'Langoustine'), is a Spanish Romani Flamenco singer. He also holds Dominican citizenship. He is nephew of singers Rafael Farina and Rafael Salazar Motos and first cousin once removed of pop-singer Tamara.

== Biography ==
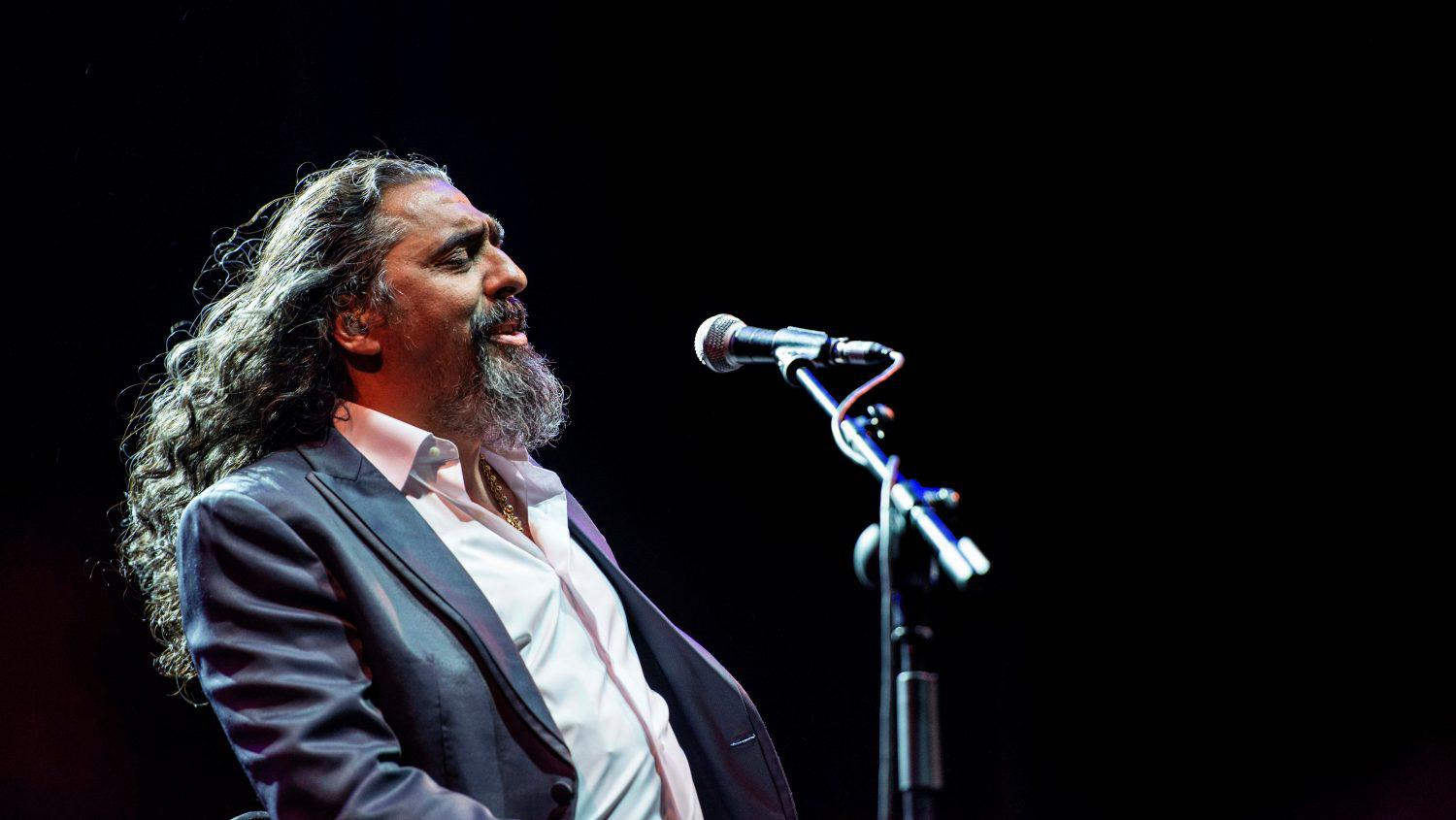
Diego el Cigala in 2018

Born into a family of Romani artists and intellectuals in Madrid, Jiménez started his career singing in flamenco clubs, until he caught the attention of flamenco dancers such as Mario Maya and Joaquín Cortés, and with guitarist Antón Jiménez, began touring as part of their companies. By the late 1990s, after collaborating on recordings by Camarón de la Isla, Tomatito, Gerardo Núñez and Vicente Amigo, he recorded his debut album "Undebel". He has since recorded a further seven albums, and has won two Grammy awards and five Latin Grammy nominations.

In 2010, he voiced Buzz Lightyear (when in "Spanish mode") for the European Spanish dub of Toy Story 3, using an Andalusian accent.

His wife, Amparo Fernández, died in 2015 from cancer in Punta Cana.

In 2024, he was convicted and sentenced to more than two years in prison. He was found guilty of all charges related to his domestic abuse against flamenco singer Dolores "Kina" Mendez, which has been reported in media and newspapers including Billboard, El País, El Mundo and El Diario de Jerez.

== Discography ==
- 1998 – Undebel
- 2000 – Entre vareta y Canasta
- 2001 – Corren tiempos de alegría
- 2002 – Teatro Real (Live album)
- 2003 – Lágrimas negras
- 2003 – Blanco y Negro en vivo (Bebo & Cigala) (Live album)
- 2005 – Picasso en mis ojos
- 2008 – Dos lágrimas
- 2010 – Cigala & Tango (Live album)
- 2013 – Romance de la luna Tucumana
- 2013 – Vuelve el flamenco (Live album)
- 2016 – Indestructible
- 2020 – Cigala canta a México
