= The Christ of the Lanterns =

1958 film

El Cristo de los Faroles (The Christ of the Lanterns)
- Directed by: Gonzalo Delgras
- Written by: Gonzalo Delgrás
- Produced by: Union Films
- Starring: Antonio Molina; María de los Ángeles Hortelano; Margarita Robles; Manuel de Juan; Alicia González; Laura Granados; José Villasante; Jesús Puente; Pedro Fenollar; Fidel Navacerrada; Rafaela Aparicio
- Music by: Daniel Montorio
- Release date: 1958
- Running time: 87 minutes
- Country: Spain
- Language: Spanish

The Christ of the Lanterns (Spanish: El Cristo de los Faroles) is a 1958 Spanish film.

== Plot ==
Antonio Reyes meets Soledad, a woman from Córdoba, in the Plaza del Cristo de los Faroles. But she ignores his attention and refuse to be another of Antonios conquests.
