= Marujita Díaz =

Spanish singer and actress

- Born: María del Dulce Nombre Díaz Ruiz; 27 April 1932; Seville, Spain
- Died: 23 June 2015 (aged 83); Madrid, Spain
- Occupations: Actress, singer

María del Dulce Nombre Díaz Ruiz (27 April 1932 – 23 June 2015) better known as Marujita Díaz was a Spanish singer and actress. She was born in Seville, Spain. Díaz was known for presenting the very popular show Música y estrellas. She also appeared in the films A Cuban in Spain (1951) and La pérgola de las flores (1965).

Díaz died of respiratory failure caused by colon cancer in Madrid, aged 83.

== Selected filmography ==
- 1998: Tesoro (short film). (Spain), directed by Miguel Ángel Vivas
- 1980: La reina de la Isla de las Perlas. (Spain), directed by Víctor Barrera
- 1978: Deseo carnal. (Spain), directed by Manuel Iglesias Vega
- 1976: El avispero. (Spain), directed by Ramón Barco
- 1975: Canciones de nuestra vida. (Spain), directed by Eduardo Manzanos Brochero
- 1974: La boda o la vida. (Spain), directed by Rafael Romero Marchent
- 1971: Carmen Boom. Grazie zio, ci provo anch'io. (Spain, Italy), directed by Nick Nostro
- 1971: Las amantes del diablo. (Spain, Italy), directed by José María Elorrieta
- 1968: Flash 22. (short film (Spain), directed by Félix Martialay
- 1965: La pérgola de las flores (1º Premio a la mejor película Argentina) (Argentina, Chile), directed by Román Viñoly Barreto
- 1964: Visitando a las estrellas. (Spain), directed by Julián de la Flor
- 1963: Lulú, El globo azul, (Spain), directed by Javier Setó
- 1963: La casta Susana. (Spain, France), directed by Luis César Amadori
- 1963: El valle de las espadas, (Productora Marujita Díaz). (Spain), directed by Javier Setó
- 1963: La mujer de tu prójimo, (Productora Marujita Díaz). (Argentina, Spain), directed by Enrique Carreras
- 1962: Han robado una estrella. (Spain), directed by Javier Setó
- 1961: Abuelita Charlestón. (Spain), directed by Javier Setó
- 1961: Canción de arrabal. (Argentina) Título alternativo: La cumparsita. Directed by Enrique Carreras
- 1960: Three Black Angels. (México), directed by Fernando Cortés
- 1960: The Showgirl (Spain)., directed by José María Elorrieta
- 1960: Pelusa, (Spain) Título alternativo: La cenicienta del circo (México), Os milagres de Pelusa (Portugal). (Premio Nacional del Sindicato del Espectáculo a la mejor actriz), directed by Javier Setó.
- 1959: Y después del cuplé. (Spain) Título alternativo:Le temps du charleston. Directed by Ernesto Arancibia
- 1957: El genio alegre, Gioventù disperata. (Spain), directed by Gonzalo Delgrás
- 1957: Ángeles sin cielo, (Spain, Italy), directed by Sergio Corbucci y Carlos Arévalo
- 1956: Polvorilla, (Spain), directed by Florián Rey
- 1955: El ceniciento, (Spain), directed by Juan Lladó
- 1955: Good Bye, Sevilla (Adiós, Sevilla), (Spain), directed by Ignacio F. Iquino
- 1954: The Fisher of Songs, directed by Antonio del Amo
- 1953: Women's Town, directed by Antonio del Amo
- 1952: ¡Ay, tu madre! o Aventuras y desventuras de Eduardini, (Spain), directed by Fernando Robles Polo
- 1951: Una cubana en España, (Argentina, Cuba), directed by Luis Bayón Herrera
- 1951: Furrows Surcos, (Spain, Portugal), directed by José Antonio Nieves Conde (4 premios del Sindicato Nacional del Espectáculo: mejor película, director, actor y actriz secundaria)
- 1950: The Troublemaker
- 1951: The Dream of Andalusia
- 1949: La aventura de Esparadrapo, (Voz) (Spain), directed by Ángel de Echenique
- 1949: La Revoltosa, (México), directed by Juan de Orduña
- 1949: El rey de Sierra Morena, (Spain), directed by Adolfo Aznar
- 1948: La cigarra, (Spain), directed by Florián Rey
