= Antonio Molina (singer) =

Spanish singer

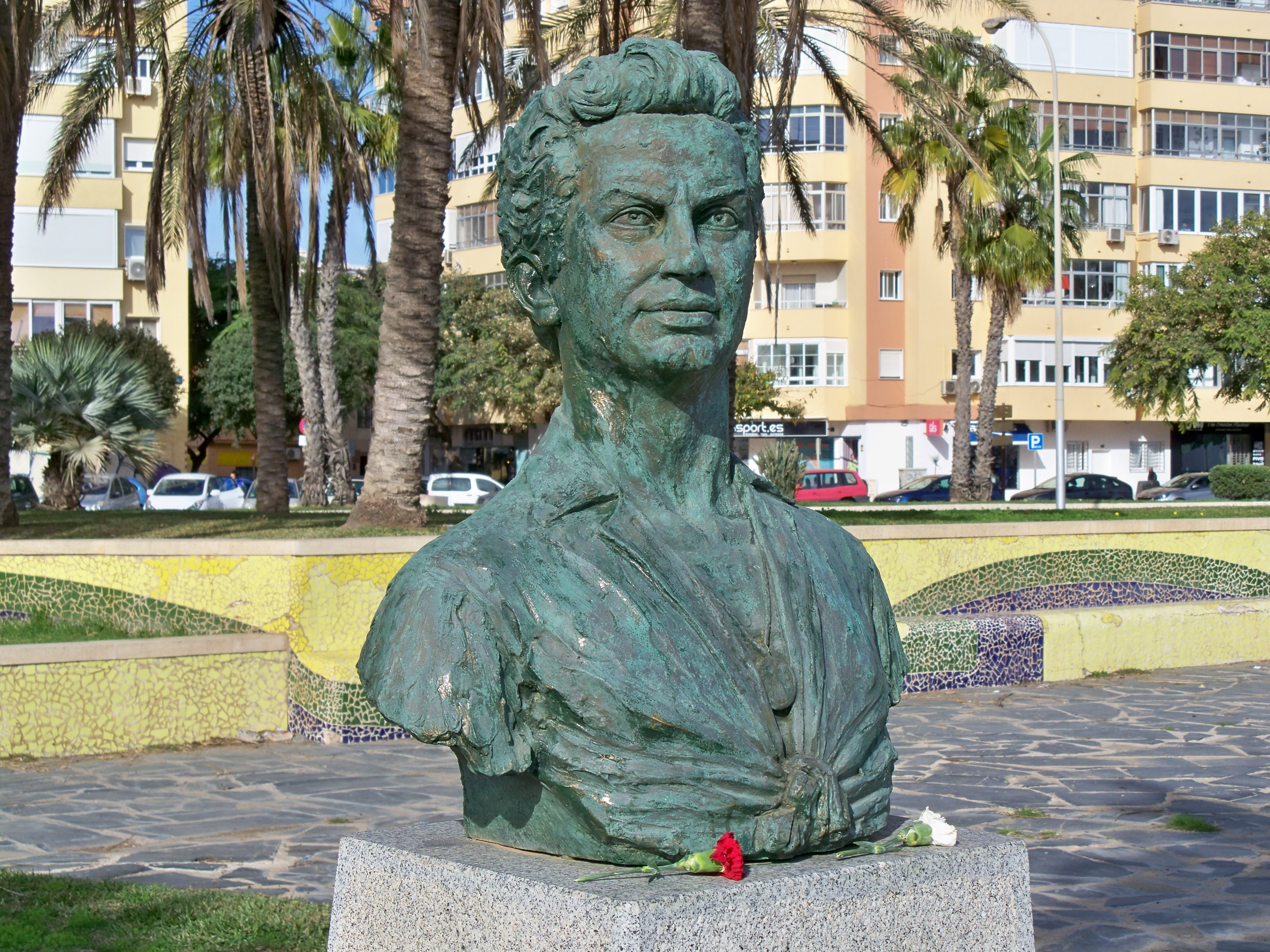
- Bust of Antonio Molina in Málaga
- Born: Antonio Molina De Oses; 9 March 1928; Málaga, Spain
- Died: 18 March 1992 (aged 64); Madrid, Spain
- Occupations: Singer; actor
- Years active: 1949–1989
- Spouse: Ángela Tejedor Capitán (1951–1992)
- Children: Antonio; Juan Ramón; Ángela Molina; José Alberto; Paula Molina; Miguel Molina; Mónica Molina; Noel Molina

Antonio Molina De Oses (9 March 1928 – 18 March 1992) was a Spanish Flamenco dancer and popular singer and actor in films and on theatrical stage. Born in Málaga, from the age of 10 he showed great aptitude for flamenco singing, and became popular by participating in various radio shows. He had a high, brilliant voice, which he perhaps abused until he lost it prematurely. He was very popular starring in many theater shows. His film career began in 1953, and he is remembered for films such as "El pescador de coplas" (1953), "Esa voz es una mina" (1955), and "La hija de Juan Simón" (1956). He maintained his popularity for many years by touring with his own musical show. After a few years of retirement, he attempted an unsuccessful come-back in 1986.

Molina was the husband of Angela Tejedor and they had 8 children, among them actors and actresses (Ángela Molina, Miguel Molina, Paula Molina, Noel Molina and Mónica Molina). He died in Madrid on 18 March 1992 from a pulmonary fibrosis he got three years before. He was buried at Fuencarral cemetery.

== Filmography ==
- For Whom the Bell Tolls (1943)
- El macetero (1951)
- The Fisher of Songs (1954)
- Esa voz es una mina (1955)
- Malagueña (1956)
- Juan Simón's Daughter (1957)
- The Christ of the Lanterns (1958 film) (1958)
- Café de Chinitas (1958)
- Puente de coplas (1961)
