= Tamara (Spanish singer) =

- Also known as: Tamara
- Born: Tamara Macarena Valcárcel Serrano; 27 June 1984 (age 42)
- Origin: Seville, Spain
- Years active: 1995–present

Tamara Macarena Valcárcel Serrano (born 27 June 1984) is a bolero, ballad and latin pop singer from Seville, Spain. She is the granddaughter of singer Rafael Farina, grandniece of singer Rafael Salazar Motos and first cousin once removed of singer Diego el Cigala.

== Discography ==
- 1999 – "Gracias"
- 2001 – "Siempre"
- 2003 – "Abrázame"
- 2004 – "Canta Roberto Carlos"
- 2005 – "Lo Mejor de Tu Vida"
- 2006 – "Emociónes en Directo"
- 2007 – "Perfecto"
- 2009 – "Amores"
- 2011 – "Más"
- 2012 – "Encandenados"
- 2013 – "Incondicional"
- 2015 – "Lo Que Calla El Alma"
