= Nogu Svelo! =

Russian rock band

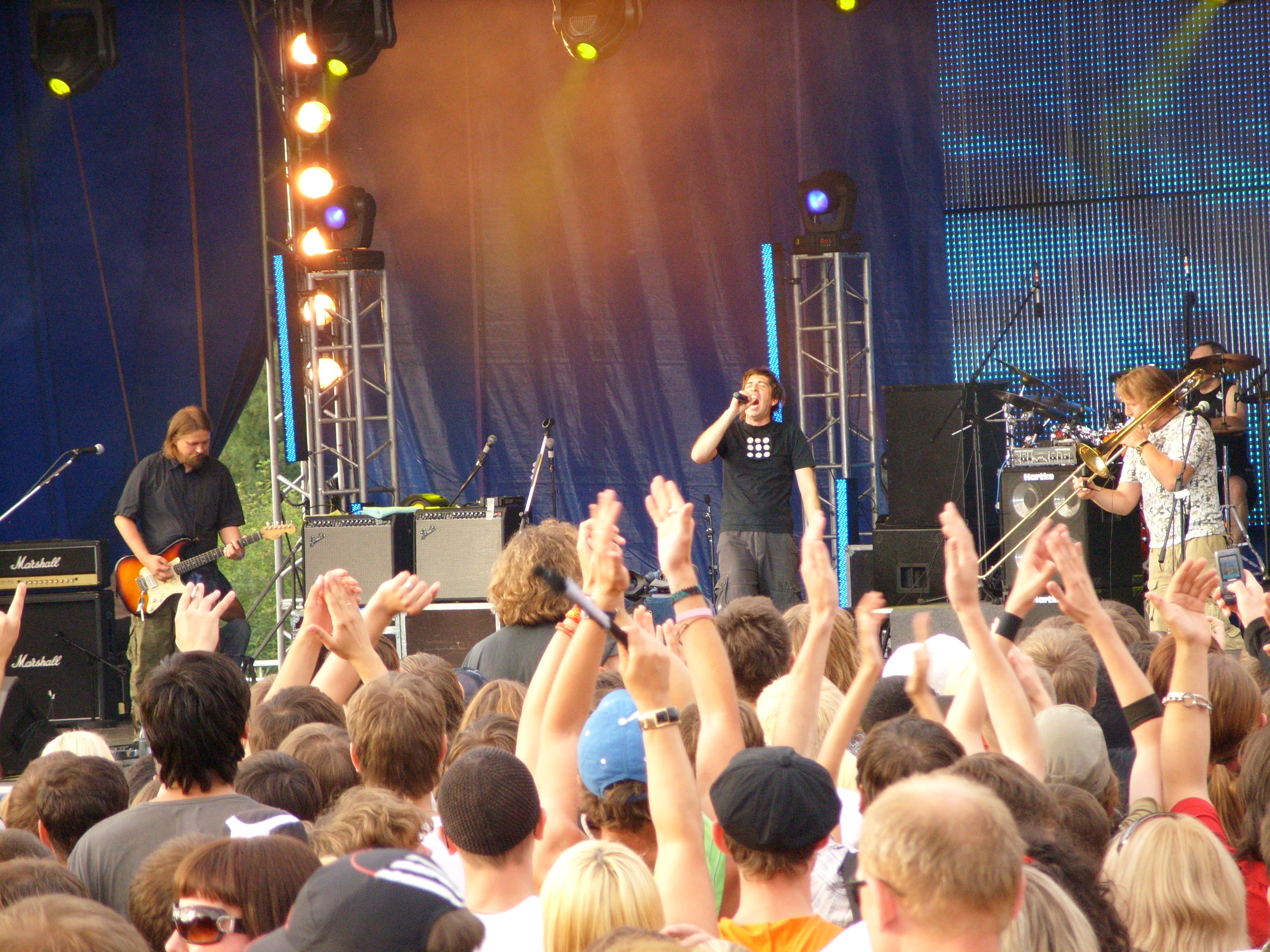

Background information
- Also known as: Golos Vselennoy
- Origin: Moscow, Russian SFSR, Soviet Union
- Genres: Alternative rock, punk rock, ska punk, experimental rock
- Years active: 1988–present
- Members: Maxim Pokrovsky; Alexander Volkov; Evgeny Grudkov; Alexander Ilyushenko; Yevgeny Bashtan; Pavel Aksenov
- Past members: Vitaly Akshevsky; Dmitry Yakomulsky; Konstantin Prokofiev; Mikhail Serov; Viktor Medvedev; Vitaly Raevsky; Anton Yakomulsky
- Website: https://nogusvelo.com/

Nogu Svelo! (Russian: Ногу свело!, lit. 'Leg has cramped!') is a contemporary Russian rock band. The group was founded by Maxim Pokrovsky, the only consistent member and author of nearly all of the band's work.

The band's work is diverse and influenced by a variety of styles, including alternative rock, pop punk, punk rock, art punk, experimental rock and others. Later works also include elements of electronic music. Lyrically, they are characterised by frequent use of humor and parody. While some of their albums include English lyrics, the majority of their work is in Russian. While originally from Moscow, the band relocated to the US in 2016 and for political reasons no longer performs in Russia.

== Early years (1988–1995) ==
The group Nogu Svelo! was founded in 1987 by singer and bass player Maxim Pokrovsky, together with guitarist Vitaly Akshevsky and later drummer Anton Yakomulsky. At the beginning Nogu Svelo! was a member of Moscow Rock Laboratory, an organization which supported both well-known and promising independent groups. In 1989, they performed at the Moscow Rock Laboratory's annual "Festival of Hope", where their performance was noted positively by critics. When Moscow Rock Laboratory broke up in 1992, Nogu Svelo! had already recorded two albums, participated in several festivals and were well-known even outside Moscow.

The band's first two albums are difficult to find, even in Russia. The debut (recorded first, but released second), 1:0 v pol'zu devochek (Russian: «1:0 в пользу девочек», lit. 'The Girls Lead 1:0') was recorded in 1990 but released in 1993. Several of the songs were re-recorded by the band on their later albums. The band's second album (recorded second, but released first), Kaprizy manekenschits (Russian: «Капризы манекенщиц», lit. 'The Capriciousness of Supermodels') was recorded in 1991 and released on vinyl in 1992. Three songs were later re-recorded: "Haru Mamburu" (Russian: «Хару Мамбуру») (1993), "Golaya koroleva" (Russian: «Голая королева», lit. 'The Naked Queen') and "Hrustal'naya vaza" (Russian: «Хрустальная ваза», lit. 'The Crystal Vase'), which appears on 1999's Kally (Russian: «Каллы», lit. 'Calla Lilies').

The song "Haru Mamburu" (Russian: Хару Мамбуру), whose lyrics are a nonsense phonetic play on English, became widely known in 1993 after winning a first prize at the festival Generation-93. It is regarded as greatly influential in the development of Russian pop-rock culture. Increased interest in the band's work due to the song "Haru Mamburu" led to the release of their 1990 album 1:0 v pol'zu devochek as a studio album in 1993.

In the same year, the album Haru Mamburu (Russian: «Хару Мамбуру») was also released. 1993's Haru Mamburu provided the majority of the material for 1995's Sibirskaya lyubov' (Russian: Сибирская любовь, lit. 'Siberian love'), a compilation of re-recorded songs from the band's first three albums and some new tracks. The 1995 release contained two new songs: the title track "Sibirskaya lyubov'", with which the band attempted to enter the Eurovision Song Contest and won the second place in the national selection in 1994, and "Rojdestvenskaya kolybel'naya" (Russian: «Рождественская колыбельная», lit. 'Christmas Lullaby').

== Turn of the century (1996–2001) ==
Having gained popularity (they even appeared with Russian mega-star Alla Pugachova in a concert), the band spent the next two years maturing their sound. Wind and horn sections received additional attention, synth parts became more colorful, bass became more subdued. The vocals of Maxim Pokrovsky changed significantly, from a lack of melodic nuance and subtlety in conveying the humorous and parodic aspects of the lyrics to having a wide emotional range, an almost crooning quality in the slower or melodic passages and a serious tone even in the most ridiculous songs. For example, in a song describing the romance between a lady and a soldier, he proclaims: "...save our women from the anti-war rabble of the world"!).

The band recorded two albums between 1997 and 1999: Schastliva, potomu chto beremenna: Siniy al'bom (Russian: «Счастлива, потому что беременна: Cиний альбом», lit. 'Happy Because I'm Pregnant: The Blue Album') and Schastliva, potomu chto beremenna: Zelyonyi al'bom (Russian: «Счастлива, потому что беременна: Зелёный альбом», lit. 'Happy Because I'm Pregnant: The Green Album').

In 1997 Nogu Svelo! wrote music for Nikulin Moscow Circus. It is still used by Russian circus performers in France, Monte-Carlo, Germany and other European countries.

The band had planned the two albums to be released nine months apart. The "Blue" album was released in 1997, but the "Green" album was released in 1999, due to scheduling and other problems. The band continued their commercial success with two hits from the "Blue" album, "Liliputskaya lyubov'" (Russian: «Лилипутская любовь», lit. 'Liliputian Love') and "Moskovskiy romans" (Russian: «Московский романс», lit. 'Moscow Romance'), the latter with an award-winning video presenting Pokrovsky as a giant Southern Caucasian begging for money on the background of a sweeping Moscow panorama.

While songs such as "Nedugi" (Russian: «Недуги», lit. 'Illnesses') still have the loose bass-driven approach of "Haru Mamburu", "Rekviem" (Russian: «Реквием», lit. 'Requiem') and "Chetyre druga" (Russian: «Четыре друга», lit. 'Four Friends') attempt a serious, more subdued style, while "Kitayskiye kolokol'chiki" (Russian: «Китайские колокольчики», lit. 'Chinese Bells') predicts the "Green" album with its use of eclectic instrumentation and bittersweet melodies. The opening track has a retro-style rock and roll guitar riff backed up by a sweeping chord sequence. The bonus tracks include a self-made dance remix of 1993's "Лысая девочка" and a noisy cover of the Russian film music classic "Na Tihoretskuyu" (Russian: «На Тихорецкую», lit. 'To Tihoretskaya').

The "Green" album was a colorfully arranged and instrumented album. Most of the album is mostly humor, with only "Volki" (Russian: «Волки», lit. 'Wolves') and "Reki" (Russian: «Реки», lit. 'Rivers') - recorded with the Russian pop-star Natalya Vetlitskaya - being true pop songs. Only "Jyvaya massa" (Russian: «Живая масса», lit. 'Live Mass') and "Iskusstvo boli" (Russian: «Искусство боли», lit. 'The Art of Pain') have anything less than immediately appealing melody lines. Eastern-tinged "Vlyublyonnye olenevody" (Russian: «Влюблённые оленеводы», lit. 'Reindeer Breeders in Love') and "Lesnaya shkola" (Russian: «Лесная школа», lit. 'The Forest School') are rich in melodies, drawing from folk music - the latter song employs a Ukrainian folk music vocal ensemble. In several songs the band employs guitar effects similar to those of Dire Straits' "Money for Nothing". The acoustic-instrumental "Muj na rabote" (Russian: «Муж на работе», lit. 'Husband at Work') is tasteful and subtle. "Volki" is a slow dance and the Nirvana pastiche "Den' rojdeniya" (Russian: «День рождения», lit. 'Birthday') samples a bass line from that band's "Very Ape".

In 1999, the out-takes and non-album tracks compilation Kally (Russian: «Каллы») was released, drawing mostly on their earlier period, to mark the band's tenth anniversary. The album opens with "Kukla" (Russian: «Кукла», lit. 'Doll') which shows the more straightforward style the band had adopted. The other tracks run the full gamut of styles: classical parody "Ave Maria" (Schubert's famous melody interpolated with incongruous guitar noise), covers of two famous Russian film melodies probably originally intended for the "Blue" album, "Myasnoy brudershaft" (Russian: «Мясной брудершафт», lit. 'The Meat Brüderschaft') parodying German popular music, early songs like "I'm Blue" and "Sporting", and drawn-out psychedelic jams "Hrustal'naya vaza" and "Diblopops" (Russian: «Диблопопс»). "Trusiki" (Russian: «Трусики», lit. 'Panties') is a fully worked-out piece of 80s indie music.

On the 2000 album Boks (Russian: «Бокс», lit. 'Boxing'), Pokrovskiy and Nogu Svelo! abandon much of what had characterized their 1990s music. The band now embraced outside influences in a wholesale way, maintaining its identity almost exclusively on the strength of Pokrovskiy's voice and image. Later in the year the band released its first CD single, "Matnaya pesnya" (Russian: «Матная песня», lit. 'Obscene Song'), containing the title track and several remixes by the band.

In the summer of 2001 Maxim Pokrovsky starred in Sarah Kane's play Cleansed, directed by J. Montvilajte. It was his first experience as an actor.

== 2000s (2002–2010) ==
Commercial success continued with the 2002 album V temnote (Russian: «В темноте», lit. 'In the Dark') and hits such as "Poslednee Tango" (Russian: «Последнее танго», lit. 'The Last Tango'), "Nashi yunye smeshnye golosa" (Russian: «Наши юные смешные голоса», lit. 'Our Young Funny Voices'), and the 2004 single "Ya - ne posledniy geroy!" (Russian: «Я - не последний герой!», lit. 'I'm Not the Last Hero!'), which became a theme song to the reality show Last Hero, a Russian version of Survivor, in which Pokrovsky participated in late 2003.

In the summer of 2002 the songs of Nogu Svelo! were played by a number of Spanish radio stations such as Radio Denia, Radio Pego, Europa Benidorm, Radio Benidorm, Cadena COPE (Valensia), Radio Gandia, Radio Naranja (Gandia).

Maxim Pokrovsky tried his hand at composing music for cinema, that is, writing the soundtrack to the film Time Is Money, which was shown in the US and Australia and was a success. At the end of 2004 the group released an album that included the soundtrack and the song “Moskva - Shaverma”, for which a video was made. In the whole there are more than 30 songs in the album.

Also in 2004 the band released its first "greatest hits" compilation entitled Otkrovennye fotografii (Russian: «Откровенные фотографии», lit. 'Candid Photos'), which collected the band's most popular songs and some tracks previously unreleased or released only as singles (such as "Ya - ne posledniy geroy!") and another single release, "Reklamnoe mesto sdayotsya!" (Russian: «Рекламное место сдаётся!», lit. 'Ad Space for Rent!'), featuring an openly anti-commercial song. The band's frontman acted in the feature film Vremya-den'gi (Russian: «Время-деньги», lit. 'Time is Money'), and the soundtrack was released in early 2005. The album contained one new song, with the rest of the album being filled with short instrumental pieces, often experimental in nature.

In 2004 Nogu Svelo! had its 15th anniversary. To celebrate the event the group put on a great show in Estrada Theatre on April, 20, which was first shown on one of the main Russian TV channels and then several times on MTV Russia.

In the summer of 2004 Maxim participated in the Russian version of the game show Fort Boyard (project of RTR - national Russian TV channel).

In late 2004 – early 2005, Maxim started working at the song "Let's Go East!" which was the main soundtrack to the film The Turkish Gambit, directed by Janick Faiziev. The song became very popular and was played on the main Russian radio stations, and the video topped TV charts. The Turkish Gambit was released in Russia, the US and Europe and was top-grossing film of the year in Russia.

The band's tenth studio album was released in 2005, entitled Idyom na Vostok! (Russian: «Идём на Восток!», lit. 'Going East!'). Before this album, the title song was used as the main soundtrack single from the 2005 Russian record-breaking blockbuster film The Turkish Gambit. The album contains the previously released "Reklamnoe mesto sdayotsya!".

On 16 June 2005, Nogu Svelo! prepared a special event for its fans - the presentation of their new album "Going East!", performed in an aircraft hangar.

In 2005, Pokrovsky appeared in the film Rhythm of Tango (director Alexander Pavlovsky, starring Natalia Oreiro), where the group's songs were used. In the autumn of 2005 Pokrovsky played Gorynych in the Hollywood film Treasure Raiders, directed by Brent Huff and produced by Alexander Nevsky. Among his partners were David Carradine, Sherilyn Fenn, William Shockley, Steven Brand and Andrew Divoff.

Maxim Pokrovsky was involved in making the anthem of the 2014 Winter Olympics in support of holding them in Sochi. In 2007 Nogu Svelo! participated in the third annual Russian Winter Festival in London.

In 2006 the group won Best Soundtrack in MTV Russia Movie Awards for its song "Going East!" written for the film The Turkish Gambit. Maxim Pokrovsky took part in making the anthem of the 2014 Olympic Games in support of holding them in Sochi.

In 2007 Nogu Svelo! participated in the 3rd annual Russian Winter Festival and in the Moscow Motion Party in London.

Yakomulsky left the band in 2007, due to mounting philosophical differences with Pokrovsky over the future course of the band's development.

On January 11, 2010, the band was jokingly renamed the "Voice of the Universe" (Russian: Голос вселенной, romanized: Golos Vselennoy) during the filming of the video for "Marsianskiy val's".

== After 2010 ==
In 2011, Nogu Svelo! released the album Obratnaya storona nogi (Russian: Обратная сторона ноги, lit. 'The other side of the leg').

The release of the 2014 album S"yesh' moyo serdtse (Russian: Съешь моё сердце, lit. 'Eat my heart') was preceded by the single "Yaytsa Faberzhe" (Russian: Яйца Фаберже, lit. 'Fabergé eggs'). The presentation of the video for the titular song in a Moscow restaurant in February 2016 involved a publicity stunt during which a theft was acted out and police pretended to arrest the musicians.

Anti-war art (2022)

Since April 2022, Nogu Svelo! has released a number of songs and videos against the Russian invasion of Ukraine, namely "Nam ne nuzhna voina!" (Russian: «Нам не нужна война!», lit. 'We don't need war!'), "Ukraine" (Russian: «Украина») "Bukva zyu" (Russian: «Буква zю», lit. 'The letter z'), "Pokolenie z" (Russian: «Поколение z», lit. 'Generation Z (song)'), "Russia, Go Home!", "Gimn obrechyonnykh" (Russian: «Гимн обречённых», lit. 'Hymn of the Doomed'), and "S novym godom, synok!" (Russian: «С новым годом, сынок!», lit. 'Happy new year, son!').

== Band members ==
Current members

- Max Pokrovsky – lead vocals, bass (1988–present)
- Igor Lapukhin – lead guitar (1991–present)
- Alexander Volkov – piano, jaw harp (2008–present)
- Dmitry Krichevsky – drums (2007–present)
- Maxim Likhachev – trombone (1993–present)

Former members

- Vitaly Akshevsky – lead guitar (1988–1990)
- Dmitry Yakomulsky – lead guitar (1989–1990)
- Konstantin Prokofiev – lead guitar (1989–1990)
- Mikhail Serov – piano (1988–1990)
- Viktor Medvedev – piano (1995–2008)
- Vitaly Raevsky – drums (1988)
- Anton Yakomulsky – drums (1988–2007)

== Discography ==
Albums

- 1992: Kaprizy manekenshchits (Russian: Капризы манекенщиц, lit. 'Models' Caprices')
- 1993: 1:0 v pol'zu devochek (Russian: 1:0 в пользу девочек, lit. '1-0 to Girls')
- 1993: Haru Mamburu (Хару Мамбуру)
- 1995: Sibirskaya Lyubov' (Russian: Сибирская любовь, lit. 'Siberian Love')
- 1997: Schastliva, potomu chto beremenna: Siniy al'bom (Russian: Счастлива, потому что беременна: Синий альбом, lit. 'Happy because I'm pregnant: The Blue Album')
- 1998: Schastliva, potomu chto beremenna: Zelyony al'bom (Russian: Счастлива, потому что беременна: Зелёный альбом, lit. 'Happy because I'm pregnant: The Green Album')
- 1999: Kally (Russian: Каллы, lit. 'Callas')
- 2000: Boks (Russian: Бокс, lit. 'Boxing')
- 2002: V temnote (Russian: В темноте, lit. 'In the dark')
- 2004: Otkrovennye fotografii (Russian: Откровенные фотографии, lit. 'Revealing Photos')
- 2005: Idyom na vostok! (Russian: Идём на Восток!, lit. 'Going East!')
- 2005: Moskva-Shaverma (Russian: Москва — Шаверма, lit. 'Moscow-Shawarma'), soundtrack for the movie Vremya - den'gi (Russian: Время — деньги, lit. 'Time is money')
- 2005: Re-release (with bonus tracks) of the albums "Schastliva, potomu chto beremenna: Siniy al'bom" (1997), "Schastliva, potomu chto beremenna: Zelyony al'bom" (1998), "Kally" (1999) and "Boks" (2000)
- 2011: Obratnaya storona nogi (Russian: Обратная сторона ноги, lit. 'The other side of the leg')
- 2014: Fast food kids
- 2014: S"yesh' moyo serdtse (Russian: Съешь моё сердце, lit. 'Eat my heart')
- 2015: Vsyo luchshe v odnom (Russian: Всё лучшее в одном, lit. 'All the best in one')
- 2017: Materiki moey planety (Russian: Материки моей планеты, lit. 'The Continents of My Planet')
- 2020: Khochu bodat'sya (Russian: Хочу бодаться!, lit. 'I want to lock antlers')
- 2021: Parfyumeriya (Russian: Парфюмерия, lit. 'Perfumery')
- 2024: Amputastiya (Russian: Ампутация, lit. 'Amputation')

EPs

- 2019: Haru Mamburu 25 (Хару мамбуру 25)
- 2020: 4 stadii karantinina (Russian: 4 стадии карантина, lit. '4 stages of quarantine')

Singles

- 2000: Matnaya pesnya (Russian: Матная песня, lit. 'Dirty song')
- 2002: Benzin (Russian: Бензин, lit. 'Gasoline')
- 2004: Ya - ne posledniy geroy! (Russian: Я — не последний герой!, lit. 'I'm Not the Last Hero!')
- 2004: Reklamnoye mesto sdayotsya! (Рекламное место сдаётся!; Your Ad Could Be Here!)
- 2012: Na Baikal (Russian: На Байкал, lit. 'To Baikal')
- 2013: Yaytsa Faberzhe (Russian: Яйца Фаберже, lit. 'Fabergé eggs')
- 2015: In100gramm
- 2016: Russkiy alfavit (Russian: Русский алфавит, lit. 'The Russian alphabet')
- 2016: Igry s ognyom (Russian: Игры с огнём, lit. 'Playing with fire')
- 2017: Tuda-syuda (Russian: Туда-сюда, lit. 'Back and forth')
- 2017: Ding-ding (Динь-динь)
- 2018: The English Alphabet
- 2018: Samurai (Russian: Самурай, lit. 'Samurai')
- 2018: Leto v nashem getto (Russian: Лето в нашем гетто, lit. 'Summer in our ghetto')
- 2018: Eroticheskie sny (Russian: Эротические сны, lit. 'Erotic dreams')
- 2019: Samolyoty-Poezda (Russian: Самолёты-Поезда, lit. 'Airplanes-Trains')
- 2019: Pushistyy Gnom (Russian: Пушистый гном, lit. 'Furry gnome')
- 2020: Zolotoe vremya (Russian: Золотое время, lit. 'Golden time')
- 2020: Molchanie Yagniat (Russian: Молчание Ягнят, lit. 'The Silence of the Lambs')
- 2020: Pora proschat'sya, 2020 (Russian: Пора прощаться, 2020, lit. 'Time to say goodbye, 2020')
- 2020: Zaebali! (Russian: Заебали!, lit. 'You've pissed me off!')
- 2021: ***beep***ЛАН
- 2021: Posledniy den' v rayu (Russian: Последний день в раю, lit. 'Last day in paradise')
- 2021: Власть (Йорш feat. Ногу Свело)
- 2022: Nam ne nuzhna voyna! (Russian: Нам не нужна война!, lit. 'We don't need war!')
- 2022: Pokolenie Z (Russian: Поколение Z, lit. 'Generation Z (song)')
- 2022: Gimn Obrechennykh (Goida, Orki!) (Russian: Гимн Обреченных (Гойда, Орки!), lit. 'Hymn of the Doomed (Goida, Orcs!)')

VHS

- 1995 “Siberian Love. The Show in the State Central Concert Hall «Russia»”

DVD

- 2005 - Pyatnadtsatiletie: Yubileyny kontsert v teatre Estrady (Пятнадцатилетие: Юбилейный концерт в театре Эстрады; “15th Anniversary. The Show in Moscow Estrada Theatre”)
- 2007 - Poteryanny poezd (Потерянный Поезд; “The Lost Train”)
- 2011 - "The Other Side of the Leg" Videos collection

Videos

- 1993: Haru Mamburu (Хару Мамбуру)
- 1994: Haru Mamburu (animated version) (Хару Мамбуру (анимационный клип))
- 1994: Vestochka (Russian: Весточка, lit. 'Message')
- 1994: Sandunovckie bani (Russian: Сандуновские бани, lit. 'Sandunovskie Baths')
- 1995: Demoralization of Love
- 1996: Rozhdestvenskaya kolybel'naya (Russian: Рождественская колыбельная, lit. 'Christmas Lullaby')
- 1996: Moskovskiy romans (Russian: Московский романс, lit. 'Moscow Romance')
- 1997: Liliputskaya lyubov' (Russian: Лилипутская любовь, lit. 'Liliputian Love')
- 1997: Den' rozhdeniya (Russian: День рождения, lit. 'Birthday')
- 1997: Reki (Russian: Реки, lit. 'Rivers')
- 1997: Ave Maria (Russian: Аве Мария, lit. 'Ave Maria')
- 1997: Ya shagayu po Moskve (Russian: Я шагаю по Москве, lit. 'Walking the Streets of Moscow')
- 1998: Volki (Russian: Волки, lit. 'Wolves')
- 1998: S.O.S. in the Ass
- 1999: Kukla (Russian: Кукла, lit. 'Doll')
- 1999: Posledneye tango (Russian: Последнее танго, lit. 'Last Tango')
- 2000: Klyazma (Клязьма)
- 2000: Sem' planet (Russian: Семь планет, lit. 'Seven Planets')
- 2002: Nashi yunye smeshnye golosa (Russian: Наши юные смешные голоса, lit. 'Our Young Funny Voices')
- 2003: Iz Alma-Aty (Russian: Из Алма-Аты, lit. 'From Almaty')
- 2003: Ya - ne posledniy geroy! (Russian: Я — не последний герой!, lit. 'I'm Not the Last Hero!')
- 2004: Reklamnoye mesto sdayotsya! (Рекламное место сдаётся!; Your Ad Could Be Here!)
- 2005: Idyom na Vostok! (Russian: Идём на Восток!, lit. 'Going East!')
- 2006: Aprel' (Апрель; April)
- 2007: Sibirskaya lyubov' (Russian: Сибирская любовь, lit. 'Siberian Love')
- 2010: Marsianskiy val's (Russian: Марсианский вальс, lit. 'Martian Waltz')
- 2014: My name is Dick
- 2014: Have a Nice Flight
- 2015: Maslo (Russian: Масло, lit. 'Oil')
- 2016: S"yesh' moyo serdtse (Russian: Съешь моё сердце, lit. 'Eat my heart')
- 2017: Igry s ognyom (Russian: Игры с огнём, lit. 'Playing with fire')
- 2017: Sudak (Russian: Судак, lit. 'Zander') (2 videos)
- 2017: Vatrushki (Russian: Ватрушки, lit. 'Cheesecakes')
- 2018: Materiki moey planety (Russian: Материки моей планеты, lit. 'Continents of my planet')
- 2018: Samurai (Russian: Самурай, lit. 'Samurai')
- 2018: Leto v nashem getto (Russian: Лето в нашем гетто, lit. 'Summer in our ghetto')
- 2018: Eroticheskie sny (Russian: Эротические сны, lit. 'Erotic dreams')
- 2019: Samolyoty-Poezda (Russian: Самолёты-Поезда, lit. 'Airplanes-Trains')
- 2019: Earthquake Shake
- 2019: Karamba Mamba (Карамба Мамба)
- 2019: Pushistyy Gnom (Russian: Пушистый гном, lit. 'Furry gnome')
- 2020: Khochu bodat'sya! (Russian: Хочу бодаться!, lit. 'I want to butt heads!')
- 2020: Sexy
- 2020: Zolotoe vremya (Russian: Золотое время, lit. 'Golden time')
- 2020: Dyshat'! (Russian: Дышать!, lit. 'Breathe!')
- 2020: Zaebali! (Russian: Заебали!, lit. 'You've pissed me off!')
- 2020: Molchanie Yagniat (Russian: Молчание Ягнят, lit. 'The Silence of the Lambs')
- 2020: Pora proschat'sya, 2020 (Russian: Пора прощаться, 2020, lit. 'Time to say goodbye, 2020')
- 2021: Selektsiya (Russian: Селекция, lit. 'Selection')
- 2021: Kryl'ya (Russian: Крылья, lit. 'Wings')
- 2021: Telezvezda (Russian: Телезвезда, lit. 'TV star')
- 2021: ***beep***ЛАН
- 2021: ***beep***ЛAH (Ska Mix)
- 2021: Posledniy den' v rayu (Russian: Последний день в раю, lit. 'Last day in paradise')
- 2021: Padshie angely (Russian: Падшие ангелы, lit. 'Fallen angels')
- 2021: Kuda ukhodit staryy god (Russian: Куда уходит старый год, lit. 'Where does the old year go')
- 2022: Nam ne nuzhna voyna! (Russian: Нам не нужна война!, lit. 'We don't need war!')
- 2022: Pokolenie Z (Russian: Поколение Z, lit. 'Generation Z')
- 2022: Nazad, Rossiya! (Russian: Назад, Россия!, lit. 'Back off, Russia!')
- 2022: Ukraina (Russian: Украина, lit. 'Ukraine')
- 2022: Ya boyus' (Russian: Я боюсь, lit. 'I am afraid')
- 2022: Gimn Obrechennykh (Goida, Orki!) (Russian: Гимн Обреченных (Гойда, Орки!), lit. 'Hymn of the Doomed (Goida, Orcs!)')
- 2022: S novym godom, synok! (Russian: С Новым годом, сынок!, lit. 'Happy new year, son!')

== Awards ==
Year	Organization	Award	Result
1993	Festival Generation	Grand Prix	Won
1994	Festival Generation	the best video	Won
1994	Music Festival in Mont-Lusson, France	Best Video	Won
1994	Golden Stag Festival	Discovery of the year	Won
1995	Award Start	Grand Prix	Won
1996	Festival "Groove"	Discovery of the year	Won
1996	MTV Russia Music Awards	Special prize	Won
1996	Festival Generation	the most scandalous video of the year	Won
1996	Festival of Computer Arts "Fantasy"	Hero of the Year	Won
1996	Festival of computer graphics	Best video	Won
1996	Award "Groove"	Best Alternative Band	Won
1997	Award "Groove"	Best Alternative Band	Won
1998	Award "Groove"	Best Alternative Band	Won
2005	Award "Groove"	Best Alternative Act	Won
2006	MTV Russia Movie Awards	Best Soundtrack	Won
