= Maksim Pokrovsky =

Russian musician (born 1968)

Maksim Pokrovsky Максим Покровский
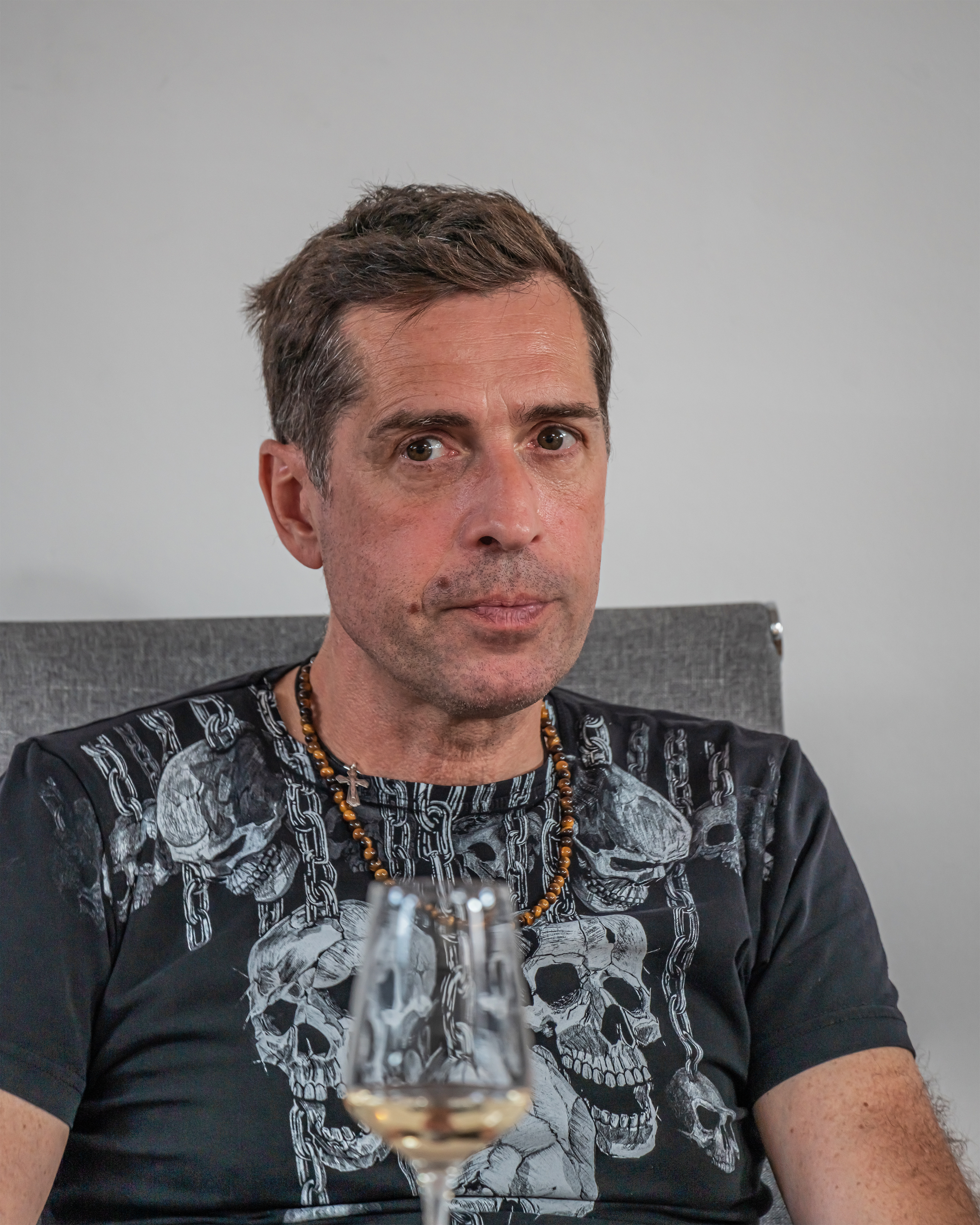
- Pokrovsky in 2024

Background information
- Born: Maksim Sergeyevich Pokrovsky; June 17, 1968 (age 58)
- Origin: Moscow, Russia
- Genres: Indie rock, alternative rock, russian rock, punk rock
- Occupations: Musician, songwriter
- Instruments: Vocals, bass, tambourine
- Years active: 1988–present
- Label: Soyuz Music
- Member of: Nogu Svelo!

Maksim Sergeyevich Pokrovsky (Russian: Макси́м Серге́евич Покро́вский, born June 17, 1968) is a Russian musician, best known as the frontman of the Moscow-based rock band Nogu Svelo!. He has also released some solo songs in Russia and the UK. He is currently working in the United States.

== Career ==
=== Nogu Svelo! ===
During the band’s 20 years history Nogu Svelo! have released 14 studio albums, 4 singles, 2 concert DVDs, and 28 video clips.

=== Film and television ===
Pokrovsky and Nogu Svelo! are regularly on TV channels such as NTV, the Channel One, Russia 2, MTV, A1. Radio Maximum, Radio Mayak, Nashe Radio and Russian Radio are also great supporters of Pokrovsky and his music.

Pokrovsky regularly participates in Russian TV shows. He had a successful stint on the reality show Last Hero, the Channel One’s version of the world famous reality show Survivor. Pokrovsky wrote a song about the laborious life on the island. The song called “I Am Not The Last Hero!” became the soundtrack to the season, and was later released as a single with additional remixes. Pokrovsky has also starred in the independent film Treasure Raiders and TV miniseries In a Tango Rhythm which also featured Nogu Svelo! on the soundtrack. Pokrovsky wrote a number of songs for Russian historical film The Turkish Gambit which appeared on the main soundtrack release. The film was released worldwide and the songs became very popular. The song won Best Soundtrack at the 2006 MTV Russia Movie Awards.

Pokrovsky also voiced the Clown With the Tearaway Face in the Russian dub of The Nightmare Before Christmas.

=== Collaborations & solo career ===
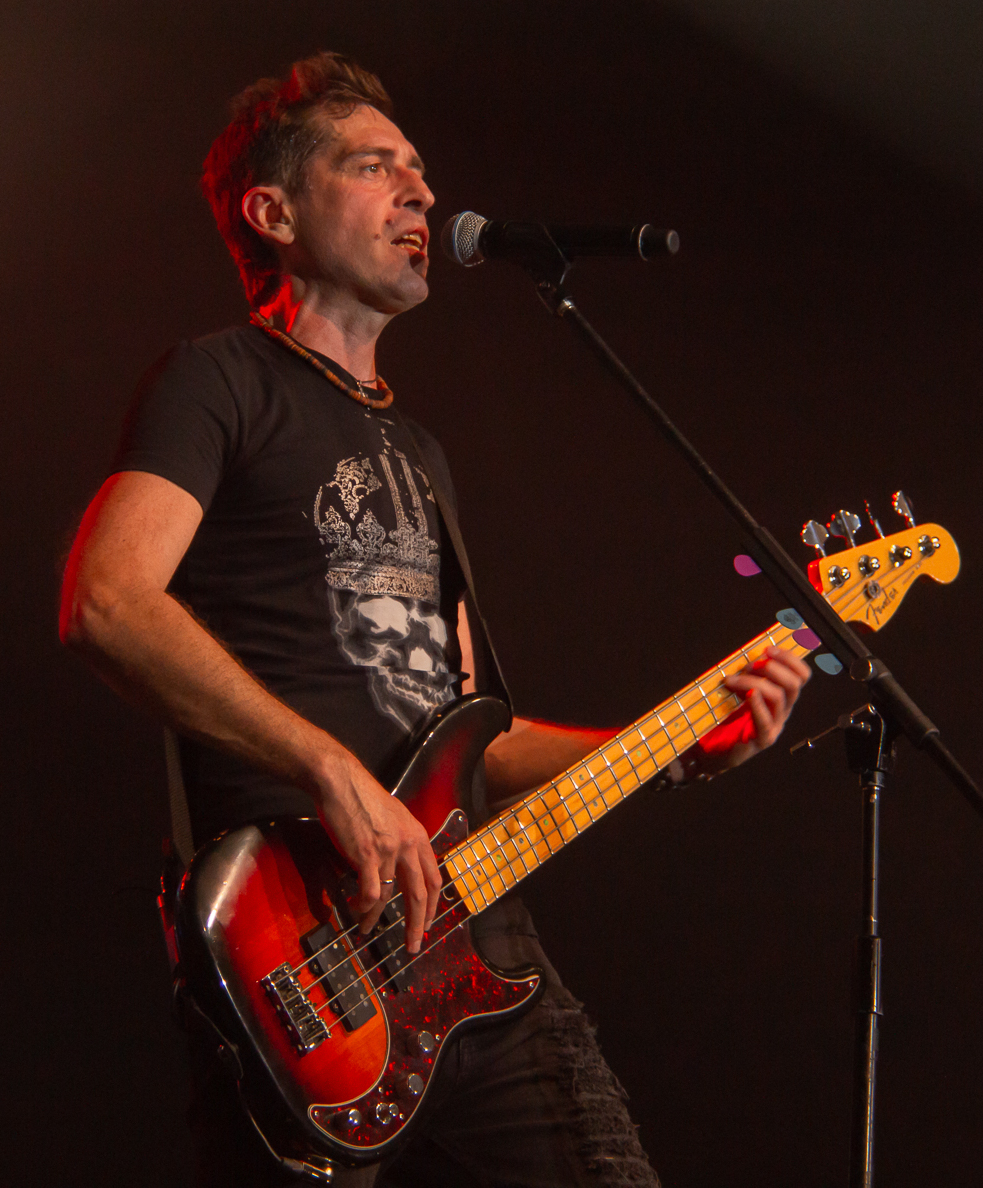
Pokrovsky in 2019

Pokrovsky established the project Max Inc. in the UK. The track "Shopping" was a club hit and reached number 38 in the dance charts. 2nd single Infinite Highway stayed at #8 in the Music week Upfront Chart for 2 months. Pokrovsky collaborated with many British DJs including DJ Stonebridge, DJ Ripper and Digital Dog.

=== Olympic anthem for Russian delegation 2012 and aftermath of the Russian invasion of Ukraine ===
Pokrovsky wrote the official anthem for Team Russia for the 2012 Olympic Games. The anthem was officially launched at the beginning of January in London. Pokrovsky visited the first Olympic event in London where he released the song to the media and special guests including the Ambassador of Russia and Lord Colin Moynihan.

Pokrovsky experienced a "completely natural" transformation into an anti-war artist after the 2022 Russian invasion of Ukraine.

== Personal life ==
Pokrovsky is married and has two children, Iliya and Taisia.
