= Martinamor =

- Municipality
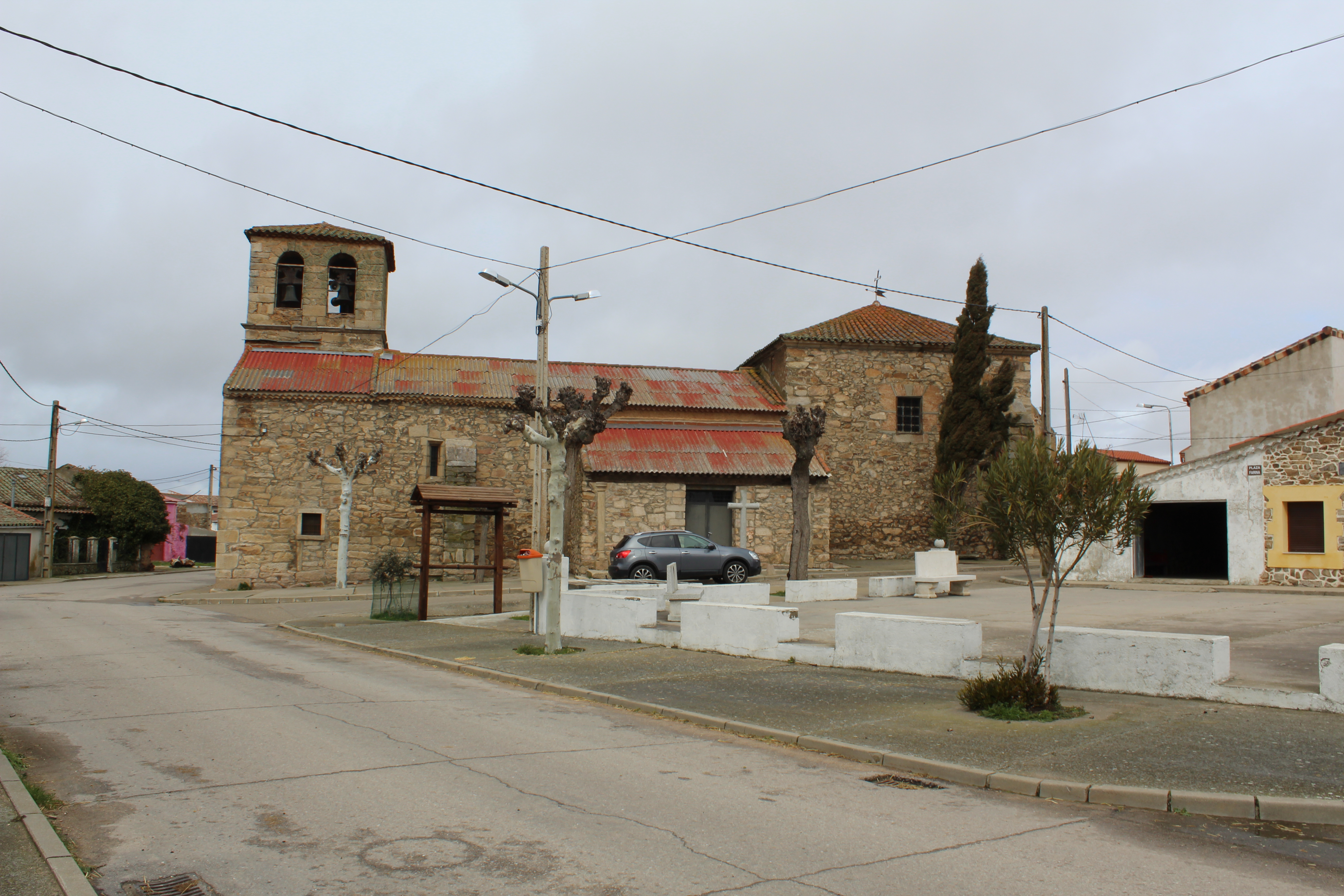
- Church of Our Lady of the Assumption

- Location in Salamanca
- Coordinates: 40°48′23″N 5°36′0″W
- Country: Spain
- Autonomous community: Castile and León
- Province: Salamanca
- Comarca: Tierra de Alba

Government
  - Mayor: Juan Antonio Martín Hernández (People's Party)

Area
  - Total: 24 km^{2} (9.3 sq mi)
- Elevation: 956 m (3,136 ft)

Population (2025-01-01)
  - Total: 91
  - Density: 3.8/km^{2} (9.8/sq mi)
- Time zone: UTC+1 (CET)
  - Summer (DST): UTC+2 (CEST)
- Postal code: 37891

Martinamor is a municipality located in the province of Salamanca, Castile and León, Spain. As of 2016 the municipality has a population of 82 inhabitants.
