= List of Spanish child actors =

This is a list of child actors from Spain. Films and/or television series they appeared in are mentioned only if they were still a child at the time of filming.

Current child actors (under the age of eighteen) are indicated by boldface.

== A ==
- Silvia Abascal (born 1979)
  - 1993-1994: Un, dos, tres... responda otra vez (18 episodes)
  - 1995: Telepasión española (1 episode)
  - 1995: Pepa y Pepe
  - 1996: Turno de oficio: Diez años después (1 episode)
  - 1997: Don Juan
  - 1997: Time of Happiness
  - 1997: Hostal Royal Manzanares (12 episodes)
- Isabel Aboy (born 1982)
  - 1995-1999: Médico de familia
  - 1998-2002: Periodistas
- María Adánez (born 1976)
  - 1978: Cabo de vara
  - 1982: Loca por el circo
  - 1983: Vivir mañana
  - 1983: El currante
  - 1983: El crack II
  - 1983: Mar brava
  - 1989: El rey del mambo
  - 1989: The Flight of the Dove
  - 1991: Farmacia de guardia
  - 1994: The Worst Years of Our Lives
- Elene Arandia (born 1989)
  - 2001-2004: Betizu
- Juanjo Artero (born 1965)
  - 1981: Estudio 1 (1 episode)
  - 1981-1982: Verano azul
- Daniel Avilés (born 2001)
  - 2009: Las manos de Abel (short film)
  - 2010: Campo de batalla (short film)
  - 2010: Miedo (short film)
  - 2010: Rascacielos (short film)
  - 2010-2012: Los protegidos
  - 2012: Zombi (short film)
  - 2012: Ayúdame a recordar (short film)
  - 2013: El don de Alba (1 episode)
  - 2013-2014: Vive cantando
  - 2015: Algo que celebrar

== B ==
- Ivana Baquero (born 1994)
  - 2004: Romasanta
  - 2004: Rottweiler
  - 2005: Fragile
  - 2005: Maria i Assou
  - 2005: Películas para no dormir: Cuento de Navidad
  - 2006: Pan's Labyrinth
  - 2008: The Anarchist's Wife
  - 2009: The New Daughter
- Juan José Ballesta (born 1987)
  - 1997-1998: Querido maestro
  - 2000: El Bola
  - 2000-2001: Compañeros (10 episodes)
  - 2002: The Shanghai Spell
  - 2002: Carol's Journey
  - 2003: The 4th Floor
  - 2005: 7 Virgins
- Javier Bardem (born 1969)
  - 1974: El Pícaro (1 episode)
  - 1981: El poderoso influjo de la luna
  - 1986: Segunda enseñanza
- Nerea Barros (born 1981)
  - 1997: A nena
- Sandra Blázquez (born 1987)
  - 1998: Al salir de clase (16 episodes)
  - 2002: Primer y último amor
  - 2002: Ana y los 7 (2 episodes)
  - 2002: Javier ya no vive solo (1 episode)
  - 2003: La vida de Rita (7 episodes)
  - 2003: Aquí no hay quien viva (1 episode)
  - 2004: Matar al ángel
  - 2004: La sopa boba
  - 2004-2007: Hospital Central (3 episodes)
- Juan Diego Botto (born 1975)
  - 1982: Ni te cases ni te embarques
  - 1983: Power Battle
  - 1984: Berta's Motives
  - 1986: El río de oro
  - 1986: Teo el pelirrojo
  - 1987: Hace quince años (short film)
  - 1989: If They Tell You I Fell
  - 1990: Ovejas negras
  - 1990-1993: Zorro
  - 1991: Cómo ser mujer y no morir en el intento
  - 1991: Lucrecia
  - 1992: 1492: Conquest of Paradise
  - 1993: Mascara de Diijon
- María Botto (born 1974)
  - 1984: Berta's Motives
  - 1985: Stico
  - 1986: Teo el pelirrojo
  - 1989: If They Tell You I Fell
- Carlota Boza (born 2001)
  - 2007-2017, 2019-present: La que se avecina
  - 2009: Clarividencia (short film)
  - 2010: La duquesa (1 episode)
  - 2010: Desalmados
  - 2011: Los misterios de Laura (1 episode)
  - 2012: El accidente
  - 2013: ¡Bingo! (short film)
  - 2015: Desatranques Jaén (short film)
- Daniel Brühl (born 1978)
  - 1994: Sven's Secret
  - 1995: Verbotene Liebe (16 episodes)
  - 1996: Der Pakt – Wenn Kinder töten

== C ==
- Javier Calvo (born 1991)
  - 2007: Doctor Infierno
  - 2008-2011: Física o Química
- Pablito Calvo (1948-2000)
  - 1955: Marcelino pan y vino
  - 1956: Uncle Hyacynth
  - 1957: The Man Who Wagged His Tail
  - 1958: Totò e Marcellino
  - 1960: Juanito
  - 1961: Alerta en el cielo
  - 1962: Dos años de vacaciones
  - 1963: Barcos de papel
- Nerea Camacho (born 1996)
  - 2008: Camino
  - 2010: Forever Young
  - 2010: Los Protegidos (1 episode)
  - 2010: Three Steps Above Heaven
  - 2011: As Luck Would Have It
  - 2012: Fuga
  - 2012: I Want You
  - 2013: El Barco (1 episode)
  - 2014: Bienvenidos al Lolita
- Carla Campra (born 1999)
  - 2007: Atlas de geografía humana
  - 2008: Cazadores de hombres (1 episode)
  - 2008-2009: Yo soy Bea
  - 2009: 90-60-90, diario secreto de una adolescente
  - 2009: La Mari 2
  - 2010: No soy como tú
  - 2011: El sueño de Iván
  - 2011: La duquesa
  - 2011-2012: Águila Roja (2 episodes)
  - 2014: Marseille
  - 2016: El secreto de Puente Viejo (1 episode)
  - 2016: The Collection (short film)
  - 2016: Centro médico (2 episodes)
  - 2016: El hombre de tu vida (1 episode)
  - 2017: Verónica
- Guillermo Campra (born 1997)
  - 2008: Carlitos y el campo de los sueños
  - 2008-2009: El Internado (3 episodes)
  - 2009: Sin Cobertura (short film)
  - 2009-2016: Águila Roja
  - 2011: Red Eagle, the Movie
  - 2012: Aída (1 episode)
  - 2014: Solo (short film)
  - 2014: Videópatas (1 episode)
- Susana Canales (1933-2021)
  - 1942: Concierto de almas
  - 1943: Dieciséis años
  - 1947: Albéniz
  - 1947: Con el diablo en el cuerpo
  - 1947: Vacations
  - 1948: La locura de Don Juan
  - 1948: White Horse Inn
  - 1949: Un Pecado Por Mes
  - 1950: El ladrón canta boleros
  - 1950: Sangre en Castilla
  - 1950: Mary tuvo la culpa
  - 1951: Black Sky
- Lucía Caraballo (born 1999)
  - 2008-2009: Hospital Central (2 episodes)
  - 2009: Águila Roja (1 episode)
  - 2009: Los hombres de Paco (2 episodes)
  - 2009: Física o química (2 episodes)
  - 2010: Gran Reserva (1 episode)
  - 2010: Uniformadas (short film)
  - 2010: Taxi (short film)
  - 2011: Carne cruda
  - 2012: Buenas noches, dijo la Señorita Pájaro
  - 2013: El club del chiste (1 episode)
  - 2014: Víctor Ros (1 episode)
  - 2014: El amor me queda grande (short film)
  - 2014: La mujer que hablaba con los muertos
  - 2014: Los huesos del frío (short film)
  - 2016: El Caso. Crónica de sucesos (1 episode)
  - 2016: Centro médico (1 episode)
  - 2016: Don't Blame the Karma for Being an Idiot
  - 2017: Cuéntame Cómo Pasó (1 episode)
  - 2017: Ángeles (short film)
  - 2017: Acacias 38 (1 episode)
- Eduardo Casanova (born 1991)
  - 2005-2014: Aída
  - 2007: Chuecatown
- Óscar Casas (born 1998)
  - 2005: Abuela de verano
  - 2006: Los Serrano (2 episodes)
  - 2006: 53 días de invierno
  - 2007: The Orphanage
  - 2009-2014: Águila Roja (54 episodes)
  - 2011: El sueño de Iván
- Anna Castillo (born 1993)
  - 2009: El enigma Giacomo
  - 2009: Persuasió (short film)
  - 2010: Blog
  - 2011: Doctor Mateo (12 episodes)
- David Castillo (born 1992)
  - 2004: Cachorro
  - 2004: Manolito Gafotas
  - 2005-2014: Aída
  - 2010: El diario de Carlota
- Marina Comas (born 1996)
  - 2010: Black Bread
  - 2011: Terra baixa
  - 2012: The Wild Ones
  - 2012: Rem
  - 2013: Club der roten Bänder (3 episodes)
  - 2013: Solisombra (1 episode)
  - 2013: Canguro (short film)
  - 2014: El cafè de la Marina
- Úrsula Corberó (born 1989)
  - 2002: Mirall trencat (3 episodes)
  - 2005-2006: Ventdelplà (7 episodes)
  - 2007: Cuenta atrás (1 episode)
  - 2007: El Internado (1 episode)
  - 2007: Crónica de una voluntad (short film)
- Patrick Criado (born 1995)
  - 2006: Con dos tacones (8 episodes)
  - 2007: 13 Roses
  - 2009-2015: Águila Roja
  - 2011: Red Eagle, the Movie
- Penélope Cruz (born 1974)
  - 1991: Softly from Paris (1 episode)
  - 1992: Jamón, jamón
  - 1992: Belle Époque

== D ==
- Pilar López de Ayala (born 1978)
  - 1995: El niño invisible
  - 1996: Yo, una mujer (2 episodes)
  - 1996: Menudo es mi padre (1 episode)
- Nino del Arco (born 1958)
  - 1964: A Fistful of Dollars
  - 1965: The Boy and the Ball and the Hole in the Wall
  - 1965: La primera aventura
  - 1967: Grandes amigos
  - 1969: La gran aventura
  - 1969: El niño y el potro (Más allá de río Miño)
  - 1971: El Cristo del Océano
  - 1972: Kalimán, el hombre increíble
- Carla Díaz (born 1998)
  - 2009: El internado (1 episode)
  - 2009: Águila Roja (1 episode)
  - 2010: La pecera de Eva (1 episode)
  - 2010: Aída (1 episode)
  - 2010-2014: Tierra de lobos
  - 2011: Punta Escarlata
  - 2012: Marco (1 episode)
  - 2012: Carmina
  - 2014: Hermanos (2 episodes)
  - 2014-2016: El Príncipe
  - 2015: Teresa
  - 2015-2017: Seis hermanas
- Maialen Diez (born 1995)
  - 2006: Betizu

== E ==
- Sandra Escacena (born 2001)
  - 2017: Veronica
  - 2017: The Same (short film)
- Irene Escolar (born 1988)
  - 2003: Imagining Argentina
  - 2004: The 7th Day
  - 2005: El comisario (1 episode)
- Yaiza Esteve (born 1994)
  - 2001: Sólo mía
  - 2002: Hospital Central (1 episode)
  - 2002: Paraíso (1 episode)
  - 2003-2004: Un lugar en el mundo
  - 2004: Corre, Adrián (short film)
  - 2004-2006: Mis adorables vecinos
  - 2006: The Backwoods
  - 2008: Proyecto Dos
- Gala Évora (born 1983)
  - 1991: El día que nací yo

== F ==
- Dafne Fernández (born 1985)
  - 1996: Canguros (1 episode)
  - 1996: Malena Is a Name from a Tango
  - 1997: Little Bird
  - 1998: Resultado final
  - 1999: Between Your Legs
  - 1999: Goya en Burdeos
  - 2000: Paraíso (1 episode)
  - 2000: The Other Side
  - 2001: Hombres felices
  - 2001: Luna's Game
  - 2002: Box 507
  - 2002: Hospital Central (1 episode)
  - 2002-2005: Un Paso Adelante (68 episodes)
- **Luna Fulgencio** (born 2011)
  - 2016: El ministerio del tiempo (1 episode)
  - 2017-2018: Ella es tu padre (13 episodes)
  - 2018: Mirage
  - 2019: Father There Is Only One
  - 2019-2020: El embarcadero (10 episodes)
  - 2020: The Barrier (3 episodes)
  - 2020: Desaparecidos (1 episode)
  - 2020: Father There Is Only One 2
  - 2020-2022: Nasdrovia
  - 2021: The Fall (5 episodes)
  - 2021: Blowing Kisses
  - 2021: The House of Snails
  - 2021: The Kids Are Alright
  - 2021: Our (Perfect) Xmas Retreat
  - 2021-2023: Supernormal
  - 2022: Entrevías (1 episode)
  - 2022: Father There Is Only One 3
  - 2022: The Te$t
  - 2022: Football Heroes of the Block
  - 2022: The Kids Are Alright 2
  - 2022: Cuesta arriba (short film)
  - 2023: Lobo feroz
  - 2023: The Boogeyman: The Origin of the Myth
  - 2024: Father There Is Only One 4

== G ==
- Ruth Gabriel (born 1975)
  - 1982: La cometa blanca
  - 1983-1987: Barrio Sésamo
- Lucía Gil (born 1998)
  - 2010-2011: Gran Reserva (14 episodes)
  - 2011-2013: La Gira (38 episodes)
  - 2012-2015: Violetta (16 episodes)
  - 2013: La Gira: Luces, cámara, acción
  - 2013: The Avatars (2 episodes)
  - 2014: XQ Esperar
  - 2015-2018: Yo quisiera
- Ricardo Gómez (born 1994)
  - 2001-2018: Cuéntame cómo pasó
  - 2004: Tiovivo c. 1950
- María José Goyanes (born 1948)
  - 1964: Confidencias (1 episode)
  - 1965: Primera fila (1 episode)
  - 1965: Sábado 64 (1 episode)
  - 1965-1974: Estudio 1 (12 episodes)
  - 1965-1970: Novela (13 episodes)
  - 1966: Diego Acevedo (1 episode)
  - 1966: Tiempo y hora (1 episode)
  - 1966: Tengo un libro en las manos (1 episode)
  - 1966: Los Encuentros (1 episode)

== I ==
- Amane Ibañez (born 1989)
  - 2003: Betizu
  - 2005: Olentzero y el tronco mágico (voice)

== J ==
- Michelle Jenner (born 1986)
  - 2000: Faust: Love of the Damned
  - 2000-2001: El cor de la ciutat
  - 2003: Més enllá de les Estrelles
  - 2003: El analista Catódico
  - 2004: Summer's Clouds
- Joselito (born 1943)
  - 1956: The Little Nightingale
  - 1958: The Nightingale in the Mountains
  - 1959: The Song of the Nightingale
  - 1959: Listen to My Song
  - 1960: The Little Colonel
  - 1960: Adventures of Joselito and Tom Thumb
  - 1961: The Two Little Rascals
  - 1961: Lovely Memory
- Jorge Jurado (born 1995)
  - 2002: Hospital Central (1 episode)
  - 2003-2008: Los Serrano
  - 2007: Goal II: Living the Dream
  - 2010-2011: Los protegidos (6 episodes)
  - 2011: Vida loca

== K ==
- Dafne Keen (born 2005)
  - 2015: The Refugees
  - 2017: Logan
  - 2019-2022: His Dark Materials
  - 2020: Ana

== L ==
- Clara Lago (born 1990)
  - 2000: Miserable Life (voice)
  - 2000: Manos a la obra (1 episode)
  - 2000-2002: Compañeros (15 episodes)
  - 2002: Carol's Journey
  - 2004: Your Next Life
  - 2004-2007: Hospital Central (27 episodes)
  - 2006: Arena en los bolsillos
  - 2007: El club de los suicidas
  - 2007-2008: Los Hombres de Paco (19 episodes)
  - 2008: LEX
- Helga Liné (born 1932)
  - 1941: Porto de Abrigo
  - 1946: Ladrão, Precisa-se!...
  - 1946: La mantilla de Beatriz
  - 1950: Kill or Be Killed
- Iván Luengo (born 2003)
  - 2010: Three Steps Above Heaven
  - 2012: Rec 3: Genesis
  - 2013: Crackòvia (1 episode)
  - 2013: Club der roten Bänder (2 episodes)
  - 2014: Aída (1 episode)
  - 2014: Campanadas (short film)
  - 2015: Night and Day
  - 2016: El pregón
  - 2016: Nit i dia (9 episodes)
  - 2017: Apaches (3 episodes)
  - 2017: El incidente (5 episodes)
  - 2017: Black Snow
  - 2018: El pan no es para los caballos (short film)
  - 2019: Claudia (short film)
  - 2021: Queer You Are (3 episodes)

== M ==
- Marisol (born 1948)
  - 1960: A Ray of Light
  - 1961: An Angel Has Arrived
  - 1962: Tómbola
  - 1963: Marisol rumbo a Río
  - 1964: La Nueva Cenicienta
  - 1964: La Historia de Bienvenido
  - 1964: Búsqueme a esa chica
  - 1965: Cabriola
- Abraham Mateo (born 1998)
  - 2009: Días sin Luz (2 episodes)
  - 2010: Raphael: Una historia de superación personal
  - 2014: Who I am (short film, cameo)
  - 2014: B&b, de boca en boca (1 episode, cameo)
  - 2015: NCIS (1 episode)
- Leire Merino (born 1988)
  - 2000-2005: Betizu
- Sandra Mozarowsky (1958-1977)
  - 1969: El otro árbol de Guernica
  - 1973: Blue Eyes of the Broken Doll
  - 1973: Lo verde empieza en los Pirineos
  - 1974: The Devil's Possessed
  - 1975: Night of the Seagulls
  - 1975: El clan de los Nazarenos
  - 1975: Sensualidad
  - 1975: Las protegidas
  - 1975: Cuando el cuerno suena
  - 1975: School of Death
  - 1975: Cuentos y leyendas (1 episode)
  - 1976: Curro Jiménez (1 episode)
  - 1976: Call Girl: La vida privada da una señorita bien
  - 1976: El hombre de los hongos
  - 1976: El libro del buen amor II
  - 1976: Beatriz
- Andreas Muñoz (born 1990)
  - 2001: The Devil's Backbone
  - 2001: Dime que me quieres
  - 2001: Paraíso (1 episode)
  - 2001-2002: Policías, en el corazón de la calle (8 episodes)
  - 2002: ¡Hasta aquí hemos llegado!
  - 2002: Don Quixote, Knight Errant
  - 2002: Onán (short film)
  - 2003: Un lugar en el mundo (1 episode)
  - 2003: Código fuego (6 episodes)
  - 2003: Atraco a las 3... y media
  - 2003: Hospital Central (1 episode)
  - 2004: El comisario (1 episode)
  - 2004: Hours of Light
  - 2004: Swindled
  - 2005: Ana y los 7 (1 episode)
  - 2005: Al filo de la ley (1 episode)
  - 2005: Ke no! (2 episodes)
  - 2005: Cuéntame Cómo Pasó (1 episode)
  - 2005: Life and Colour
  - 2006: My Quick Way Out
  - 2006: Arena en los bolsillos
  - 2006: El comisario (1 episode)
  - 2006: Hospital Central (3 episodes)
  - 2007: Goal II: Living the Dream
  - 2007: Quart (1 episode)
  - 2008: 2 de mayo, la libertad de una nación
  - 2008: Paredes (short film)
  - 2008-2009: Cosas de la vida
- Miguel Ángel Muñoz (born 1983)
  - 1994: La vida siempre es corta (short film)
  - 1995: El Palomo cojo
  - 1997: Mamá quiere ser artista (6 episodes)
  - 1997-1998: Al salir de clase (77 episodes)
  - 1999: Condenadas a entenderse (1 episode)
  - 2000: ¡Ala... Dina! (1 episode)
  - 2000: Policías, en el corazón de la calle
  - 2000-2002: Compañeros (16 episodes)
  - 2001: Gente pez
  - 2001: Periodistas (2 episodes)

== N ==
- Tamar Novas (born 1986)
  - 1999: Butterfly's Tongue
  - 2004: The Sea Inside

== O ==
- **Sofía Otero** (born 2013)
  - 2023: 20,000 Species of Bees
  - 2023: Cuéntame Cómo Pasó (2 episodes)

== P ==
- Víctor Palmero (born 1989)
  - 2005: Sprint especial
  - 2006: Love to Keep
- Ana Polvorosa (born 1987)
  - 1999: Nada es para siempre (1 episode)
  - 2000: Raquel busca su siti
  - 2001: ¡Ala... Dina! (1 episode)
  - 2002-2003: Javier ya no vive solo
  - 2003: Hospital Central (1 episode)
  - 2003-2004: Ana y los 7 (18 episodes)
  - 2004: El comisario (1 episode)
  - 2004: Escuela de seducción
  - 2005: La gota (short film)
  - 2005: Los recuerdos de Alicia

== R ==
- Martiño Rivas (born 1985)
  - 1998-2000: Mareas vivas
- Elena Rivera (born 1992)
  - 2003-2018: Cuéntame cómo pasó
- Antoñito Ruiz (born 1951)
  - 1965: For a Few Dollars More
  - 1966: Dollars for a Fast Gun
  - 1966: The Good, the Bad and the Ugly
  - 1967: A Bullet for the General
  - 1967: The Long Duel
  - 1968: Un día después de agosto
  - 1968: Villa Rides
  - 1968: Llego, veo, disparo
  - 1968: Massacre Harbor

== S ==
- Jorge Sanz (born 1969)
  - 1979: La miel
  - 1980: El canto de la cigarra
  - 1980: Los locos vecinos del 2º
  - 1981: La leyenda del tambor
  - 1981: Dos pillos y pico
  - 1981: Dos y dos, cinco
  - 1981: Verano azul (1 episode)
  - 1982: Conan the Barbarian
  - 1982: Crónica del alba. Valentina
  - 1982: La rebelión de los pájaros
  - 1983: Mar brava
  - 1983: Vivir mañana
  - 1984: Dos mejor que uno
  - 1985: Goya (1 episode)
  - 1986: Year of Enlightment
  - 1986: Segunda enseñanza (1 episode)
  - 1986: Pepe Carvalho (1 episode)
  - 1986: Mambru Went to War
- Aurora Bayona Sarriá (born 1947)
  - 1963: Como dos gotas de agua
  - 1964: Dos chicas locas, locas
  - 1965: Whisky y vodka
  - 1965: Sharp-Shooting Twin Sisters
- Pilar Bayona Sarriá (born 1947)
  - 1963: Como dos gotas de agua
  - 1964: Dos chicas locas, locas
  - 1965: Whisky y vodka
  - 1965: Sharp-Shooting Twin Sisters
- Sirena Segura (born 2013)
  - Father There Is Only One (2019-2025)
- Emma Suárez (born 1964)
  - 1979: Memorias de Leticia Valle
  - 1980: Detrás de cada día (short film)
  - 1981: Crónica de un instante
  - 1981: Woody y yo (short film)
  - 1982: Un pasota con corbata

== T ==
- Fernando Tielve (born 1986)
  - 1998: A las once en casa (7 episodes)
  - 2001: The Devil's Backbone
  - 2001: Estés donde estés (short film)
  - 2002: The Shanghai Spell
  - 2002: El hombre del saco (short film)
  - 2003: Imagining Argentina
  - 2004: Ratas (short film)
  - 2004: Niño vudú (short film)
- Ana Torrent (born 1966)
  - 1968: Un día después de agosto
  - 1973: The Spirit of the Beehive
  - 1976: Cría Cuervos
  - 1977: Elisa, vida mía
  - 1979: Ogro
  - 1980: The Nest
  - 1983: Anillos de oro (1 episode)
  - 1983: Mir reicht's - ich steig aus
  - 1983-1984: El jardín de Venus (3 episodes)

== U ==
- Beñat Urkiola (born 1998)
  - 2006: Betizu

== V ==
- Manuela Velasco (born 1975)
  - 1983: Los desastres de la guerra (1 episode)
  - 1987: Law of Desire
  - 1988: El juego más divertido
- Maribel Verdú (born 1970)
  - 1985: La huella del crimen (1 episode)
  - 1986: Segunda enseñanza (1 episode)
  - 1986: 27 Hours
  - 1986: Year of Enlightment
  - 1986: Nunca se sabe
  - 1986: Turno de oficio (1 episode)
  - 1987: Vida privada
  - 1987: Hostages in the Barrio
  - 1988: El juego más divertido
  - 1988: Barcelona Connection
  - 1988: Sinatra
  - 1988: Scent of a Crime
  - 1988: The Little Spanish Soldier
  - 1988: Don Juan itinerante
- Juan José Videgain (born 1975)
  - 1989: Julios
