= List of horror films of 1975 =

A list of horror films released in 1975.

Title	Director(s)	Cast	Country	Notes	Ref.
Autopsy	Armando Crispino	Barry Primus, Mimsy Farmer, Ray Lovelock	Italy		
The Bedevilled	Lo Wei	O Chun Hung, Reiko Ike, James Tien	Hong Kong		
Black Magic	Ho Meng Hua	Ti Lung, Lo Lieh	Hong Kong		
Blacker Than the Night	Carlos Enrique Taboada	Claudia Islas, Helena Rojo, Susana Dosamantes, Lucía Méndez	Mexico		
Bug	Jeannot Szwarc	Bradford Dillman, Joanna Miles, Alan Fudge	United States		
Criminally Insane	Nick Millard	Priscilla Alden	United States		
The Cursed Medallion	Massimo Dallamano	Richard Johnson, Joanna Cassidy, Ida Galli	Italy	Alternative title(s): The Night Child	
The Dead Don't Die	Curtis Harrington	George Hamilton, Linda Cristal, Joan Blondell	United States	Television film	
Deafula	Peter Wolf	Peter Wolf, Lee Darel	United States		
Death at an Old Mansion	Yoichi Takabayashi	Akira Nakao, Takahiro Tamura	Japan		
Deep Red	Dario Argento	David Hemmings, Daria Nicolodi, Macha Méril	Italy	Alternative title(s): Profondo Rosso; The Hatchet Murders	
The Devil's Rain	Robert Fuest	Ernest Borgnine, Eddie Albert, Ida Lupino	United States		
Eyeball	Umberto Lenzi	John Richardson, Martine Brochard, Inex Pellegrini	Italy		
The Ghoul	Freddie Francis	Peter Cushing, John Hurt, Alexandra Bastedo	United Kingdom		
God's Bloody Acre	Harry Kerwin	Wayne Crawford	United States		
House of Mortal Sin	Pete Walker	Anthony Sharp	United Kingdom	Alternative title(s): The Confessional	
I Don't Want to Be Born	Peter Sasdy	Joan Collins, Ralph Bates, Eileen Atkins	United Kingdom	Alternative title(s): The Devil Within Her; The Monster	
Inn of the Damned	Terry Bourke	Judith Anderson, Alex Cord, Michael Craig	Australia		
Jaws	Steven Spielberg	Roy Scheider, Richard Dreyfuss	United States	First film of Jaws franchise	
The Killer Must Kill Again	Luigi Cozzi	Cristina Galbó, George Hilton, Femi Benussi	Italy		
Kiss of the Tarantula	Chris Munger	Eric Mason, Suzanna Ling, Beverly Eddins	United States		
Last Stop on the Night Train	Aldo Lado	Marina Berti, Franco Fabrizi, Irene Miracle	Italy	Alternative title(s): Night Train Murders''	
Legend of the Werewolf	Freddie Francis	Peter Cushing	United Kingdom		
Lips of Blood	Jean Rollin	Jean-Loup Philippe, Annie Belle, Nathalie Perrey	France		
Mary, Mary, Bloody Mary	Juan López Moctezuma	Cristina Ferrare, John Carradine, Helena Rojo	Mexico; United States		
Night of the Seagulls	Amando de Ossorio	José Antonio Calvo, Julie James	Spain	Alternative title(s): Night of the Blood Cult; Night of the Death Cult	
Picnic at Hanging Rock	Peter Weir	Rachel Roberts, Dominic Guard, Helen Morse	Australia		
Race with the Devil	Jack Starrett	Peter Fonda, Warren Oates, Loretta Swit	United States		
The Reincarnation of Peter Proud	J. Lee Thompson	Michael Sarrazin, Margot Kidder, Jennifer O'Neill	United States		
The Rocky Horror Picture Show	Jim Sharman	Tim Curry, Susan Sarandon, Barry Bostwick	United Kingdom		
Salò, or the 120 Days of Sodom	Pier Paolo Pasolini	Paolo Bonacelli, Giorgio Cataldi, Umberto Paolo Quintavalle	Italy; France		
Satanic Pandemonium	Gilberto Martinez Solares	Cecilia Pezet, Enrique Rocha, Delia Magaña	Mexico		
Satan's Children	Joe Wiezycki	Stephen White, Joyce Molloy	United States		
School of Death	Pedro L. Ramírez	Dean Selmier, Sandra Mozarowsky	Spain		
Shivers	David Cronenberg	Barbara Steele, Lynn Lowry, Vlasta Vrána	Canada		
The Spiral Staircase	Peter Collinson	Jacqueline Bisset, Christopher Plummer	United Kingdom		
The Stepford Wives	Bryan Forbes	Katharine Ross, Paula Prentiss	United States		
Trilogy of Terror	Dan Curtis	Karen Black, Jim Storm, Tracy Curtis	United States	Television film	
The Werewolf of Woodstock	John Moffitt	Tige Andrews, Belinda Balaski, Harold J. Stone	United States	Television film	
The Werewolf and the Yeti	Miguel Iglesias Bonns	Jacinto Molina	Spain		
A Woman Possessed	Mario Mercier	Lisa Livane, Erika Maaz, Jean-François Delacour	France	Original title: La papesse	

== Sources ==
- Albright, Brian (2012). Regional Horror Films, 1958-1990: A State-by-State Guide with Interviews. Jefferson, North Carolina: McFarland. ISBN 978-1-476-60042-0.
- Chibnall, Steve; Petley, Julian, eds. (2002). British Horror Cinema. New York City, New York: Routledge. ISBN 978-0-415-23003-2.
- Deal, David (2007). Television Fright Films of the 1970s. Jefferson, North Carolina: McFarland. ISBN 978-0-786-42929-5.
- Hardy, Phil, ed. (1995). The Overlook Film Encyclopedia. Vol. 3. Overlook Press. ISBN 0-87951-624-0.
- Lentz, Harris M. (1989). Science Fiction, Horror & Fantasy Film and Television Credits Supplement: Through 1987. Jefferson, North Carolina: McFarland. ISBN 978-0-899-50364-6.
- Muir, John Kenneth (2007). Horror Films of the 1970s. Jefferson, North Carolina: McFarland. ISBN 978-0-786-49156-8.
- Murguía, Salvador Jimenez, ed. (2016). The Encyclopedia of Japanese Horror Films. Lanham, Maryland: Rowman and Littlefield. ISBN 978-1-442-26167-9.
- Paul, Louis (2015). Italian Horror Film Directors. Jefferson, North Carolina: McFarland. ISBN 978-0-786-48749-3.
- Lazaro-Reboll, Antonio (2012). Spanish Horror Film. Edinburgh, Scotland: Edinburgh University Press. ISBN 978-0-748-63640-2.
- Shelley, Peter (2012). Australian Horror Films, 1973-2010. Jefferson, North Carolina: McFarland. ISBN 978-0-786-46167-7.
- Stine, Scott Aaron (2015). The Gorehound's Guide to Splatter Films of the 1960s and 1970s. Jefferson, North Carolina: McFarland. ISBN 978-0-786-49140-7.
