= Paula Dalli =

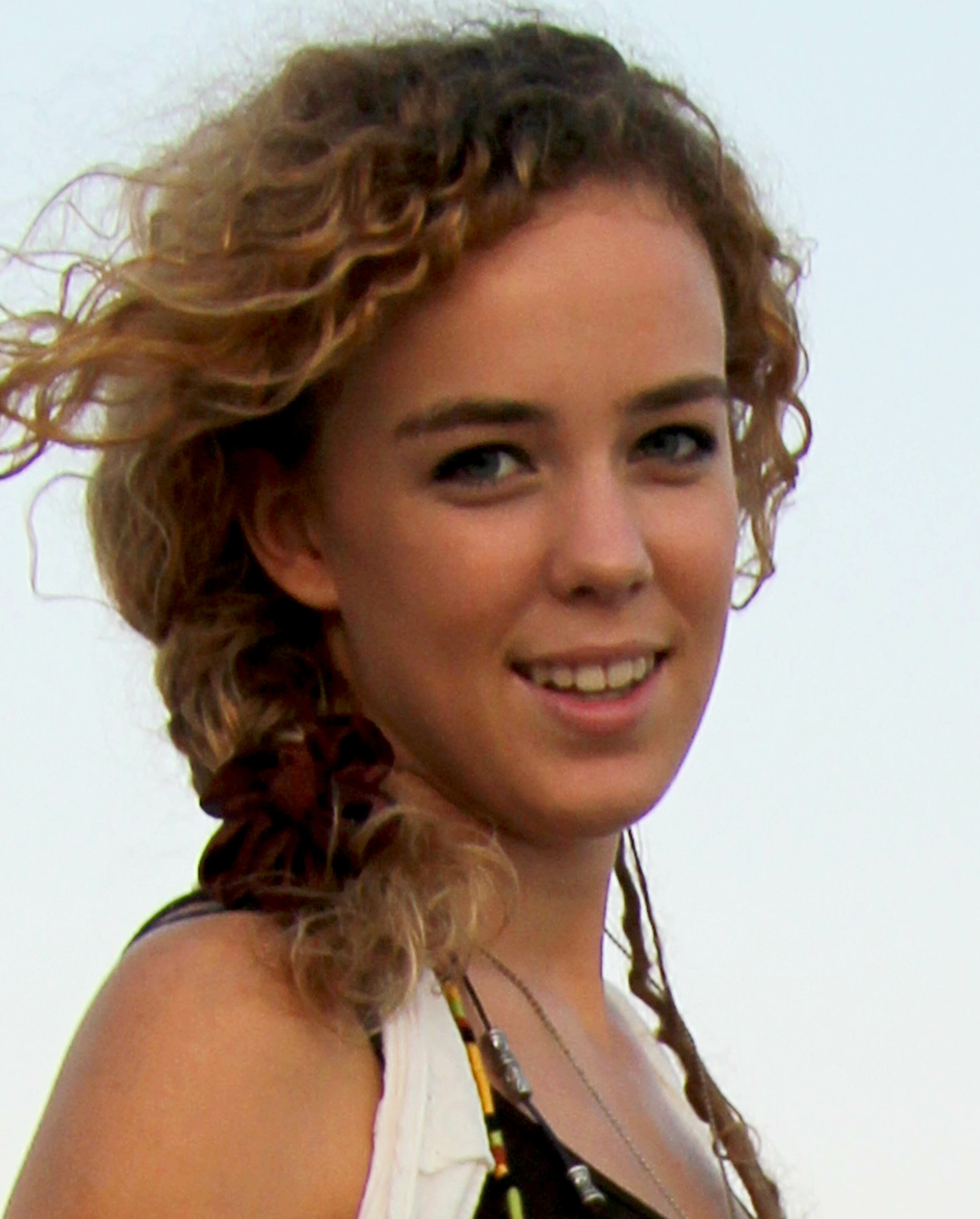

Background information
- Birth name: Paula Mónica Hernández Dalli
- Born: 16 August 1993 (age 31); L'Alfàs del Pi, Alicante, Spain
- Genres: Pop, soundtrack
- Occupation(s): Singer, actress
- Years active: 2009–present

Paula Mónica Hernández Dalli, known mostly as Paula Dalli, is a Spanish singer and actress born in L'Alfàs del Pi, Alicante on August 16, 1993. Paula is best known for being a finalist in the Spanish version of My Camp Rock and for starring in the series La Gira where she played Carol.

== Discography ==
=== Soundtracks with Pop4U ===
Title	Album details	Charts
Title	Album details	SPA
La gira - EP	Released: 24 May 2011; Label: Walt Disney Records; Format: digital distribution	

Title	Album details	Charts
Title	Album details	SPA
La Gira Season 2: English title: La Gira Season 2 (Spanish Version)	Soundtrack to the Disney Channel Spain series La Gira; Released: 12 March or 13, 2012; Label: Walt Disney Records / EMI Music Spain S.A.; Format: CD, digital distribution	12

== Filmography ==
Series
Year	Title	Character	Notes
2009	My Camp Rock	Herself	Full first Edition
2011–2013	La Gira	Carol	52 episodes
