= Álvaro de Luna (actor) =

Spanish actor (1935–2018)

- Born: Álvaro de Luna Blanco; 10 April 1935; Madrid, Spain
- Died: 2 November 2018 (aged 83); Madrid, Spain
- Years active: 1961–2018

Álvaro de Luna Blanco (10 April 1935 – 2 November 2018) was a Spanish actor. He performed in more than one hundred films since 1961. He was most known for El Algarrobo in Curro Jiménez.

In 1963 he appeared in El verdugo, by Luis García Berlanga. In 1987 he appeared in the TV series Vísperas.

He died on 2 November 2018 from a hepatic insufficiency.

== Selected filmography ==
=== Film ===
- 1961: The Colossus of Rhodes (uncredited)
- 1962: The Son of Captain Blood as Pirata (uncredited)
- 1962: Torrejón City as Pelea en saloon (uncredited)
- 1962: Vampiresas 1930 as Pelea
- 1963: The Adventures of Scaramouche
- 1963: Los conquistadores del Pacífico
- 1963: Objetivo: las estrellas as El Tigre
- 1963: Pacto de silencio as Forense
- 1964: The Black Tulip
- 1964: The Two Gladiators as Pannunzio
- 1964: A Fistful of Dollars as Rojo Gang Member (uncredited)
- 1964: The Seven from Texas as Burns
- 1964: Minnesota Clay (uncredited)
- 1964: Gunmen of the Rio Grande as Pistolero
- 1965: Seven Hours of Gunfire as Utter
- 1965: Per un pugno nell'occhio as Sargento Black (uncredited)
- 1965: Shoot to Kill as Henchman
- 1965: Whisky y vodka
- 1965: That Man in Istanbul as Bogo
- 1965: Megatón Ye-Ye as Fausto
- 1965: Operation Double Cross as Hamlet
- 1965: All'ombra di una colt (uncredited)
- 1966: Kid Rodelo
- 1966: Z7 Operation Rembrandt as Kosky Henchman
- 1966: Lola, espejo oscuro as Franky
- 1966: Arizona Colt as Watch Henchman
- 1966: Navajo Joe as Sancho Ramirez - Member of Duncan's Gang
- 1967: El halcón de Castilla as Acunia
- 1967: The Hellbenders as Bixby
- 1967: Amor a la española as Hombre que discute con Paco
- 1967: I'll Kill Him and Return Alone as Aguador (uncredited)
- 1967: The Viscount as Jean
- 1967: The Christmas Kid as Burt Froelich
- 1967: Las que tienen que servir as Spencer
- 1967: 15 Scaffolds for a Murderer as Deputy Sheriff
- 1967: Day of Anger as Wild Jack's Henchman (uncredited)
- 1968: Ballad of a Bounty Hunter as Bandido
- 1968: Fruit of Temptation as Fernández (uncredited)
- 1968: Dame un poco de amooor...!
- 1968: Giugno '44 - Sbarcheremo in Normandia as Cliff
- 1968: The Mercenary as Ramón
- 1969: Cemetery Without Crosses as Deputy Sheriff (uncredited)
- 1969: Relaciones casi públicas as Chucho
- 1969: Les étrangers as Percy
- 1969: Mónica Stop as Espía
- 1969: Sundance and the Kid as Bad Jim's Henchman (uncredited)
- 1970: Des vacances en or
- 1970: Dele color al difunto as Julio
- 1970: An Imperfect Crime as Matón #3
- 1970: Un par de asesinos as Patrick Kirby
- 1970: Sabata the Killer as Garfield Hechman
- 1970: El monumento as Portillo
- 1970: En un lugar de La Manga as Amigo de Juan
- 1970: No desearás al vecino del quinto as Liborio
- 1970: Compañeros as John's Henchman #1
- 1970: El astronauta as Hijo de la anciana que está viendo la TV
- 1970: Growing Leg, Diminishing Skirt as Alberto García del Chaparral
- 1971: La orilla as Comandante Rojo
- 1971: Préstame quince días as Un pueblerino
- 1971: El diablo Cojuelo as Juez
- 1971: No desearás la mujer del vecino as Felipe - el boxeador
- 1971: La red de mi canción as E. Avilés
- 1971: Los días de Cabirio as Lacayo de Tía
- 1971: Si Fulano fuese Mengano as Amigo de Miguel
- 1972: La cera virgen as Jiménez
- 1972: Los novios de mi mujer as Jorge
- 1972: Venta por pisos as Julio 'Sansón' Gutiérrez Vizcaino
- 1972: Sonny and Jed as Sheriff with Bowler Hat
- 1972: Soltero y padre en la vida as Camarero del club Go-Go
- 1973: Count Dracula's Great Love as Second Porteador
- 1974: Odio mi cuerpo as Camilo
- 1974: El insólito embarazo de los Martínez as Tigre
- 1975: Evil Eye as Police Officer (uncredited)
- 1975: Order to Kill as Daniel
- 1975: El clan de los Nazarenos as Carlos
- 1975: El mejor regalo as Enfermero
- 1976: Celedonio y yo somos así as Hermano de Cristina
- 1977: Foul Play as Cacique #1
- 1978: Avisa a Curro Jiménez as El Algarrobo
- 1978: Donde hay patrón... as Marcial
- 1980: Él y él as Enrique
- 1980: El gran secreto as Camionero
- 1980: Todos me llaman Gato as Álvaro
- 1981: La quinta del porro as El Sargento
- 1981: Duelo a muerte as Capitán
- 1982: Sweet Hours as Tío
- 1982: En septiembre as Perico
- 1982: El cabezota as El cabezota
- 1982: Jane, mi pequeña salvaje as Tom
- 1984: El balcón abierto as El jinete
- 1985: Puente de invierno as Lorenzo
- 1986: Teo el pelirrojo as Teo
- 1987: La guerra de los locos as Rubio
- 1987: Mi general as Comandante Barbadillo
- 1987: Luna de lobos as Gildo
- 1988: Gallego as Aniceto
- 1988: El tesoro as El Papo
- 1991: Tramontana as Don Gerau
- 1993: La febre d'Or as Bernando Foix
- 1996: Pesadilla para un rico as Lorenzo
- 1998: Mambí as Sargento Arocha
- 2000: Maestros
- 2000: Lázaro de Tormes as Calderero
- 2001: Silencio roto as Don Hilario
- 2002: La soledad era esto as Juanjo
- 2002: La marcha verde as Coronel
- 2002: Carol's Journey as Don Amalio
- 2003: Las voces de la noche as El viejo
- 2007: Theresa: The Body of Christ as Padre de Teresa
- 2007: And Who Are You? as Luis
- 2007: The Field of Stars as Alfonso
- 2007: Camino al Edén
- 2008: El libro de las aguas as Faustino
- 2014: Spanish Western as Himself
- 2018: Miau as Aramendi
- 2019: Sesión Salvaje as Himself (final film role)

=== Television ===
- Curro Jiménez (1976–1978) as El Algarrobo
- La barraca (1979) as Batiste
- Herederos (2007–2008) as Antonio Moro
