= Scandal in the Family =

Scandal in the Family can refer to:

- Scandal in the Family (1967 film), a 1967 Argentine film
- Scandal in the Family (1975 film), a 1975 Italian film
