= Sergio Galindo =

Sergio Galindo (September 2, 1926 – January 3, 1993) was a Mexican novelist and short story writer. He was born in Xalapa in the state of Veracruz, a region of Mexico that figures prominently in much of his writing. His most popular and widely acclaimed novels are El Bordo (“The Precipice”, 1960) and Otilia Rauda (1986), the latter filmed as La Mujer del Pueblo in 2001. Galindo studied at the Mexican National Autonomous University (UNAM) and in Paris. He was the founder and first director of the University of Veracruz Press, where he also founded and edited the journal La Palabra y el Hombre (“The Word and the Man”).

Galindo was Director of the Palacio de Bellas Artes (National Institute of Fine Arts) from 1974 to 1976.

== Prizes, honours and translations ==
Galindo was awarded the following prizes and honours: Honorary Officer of the Order of the British Empire, Polish award for Cultural Merit, Order of the Star of Yugoslavia, Mariano Azuela Prize, the Bellas Artes Literature Prize, the Xavier Villarrutia Prize and the José Fuentes Mares National Prize for Literature. He was elected to the Mexican Academy of the Language in 1975 and to the Spanish Royal Academy the following year. In 2006, the University of Veracruz and its International University Book Festival inaugurated an annual prize for first novels by Latin American writers, called the Premio Latinoamericano de Primera Novela Sergio Galindo. His works have been translated into English, French, Polish, German and Italian.

== Novels ==
- Polvos de arroz (translated into English as “Rice Powder”), 1958
- La justicia de enero, 1959
- El Bordo (translated into English as “The Precipice”), 1960
- La comparsa, 1964
- Nudo, 1970
- El hombre de los hongos, 1976 (filmed in 1980)
- Los dos ángeles, 1984
- Declive, 1985
- Otilia Rauda (translated into English as “Otilia’s Body”), 1986 (filmed in 2001)

== Short story collections ==
- La máquina vacía, 1951
- ¡Oh hermoso mundo!, 1975
- Este laberinto de hombres, 1979
- Cuentos, 1982
- Terciopelo violeta, 1985

Other writing

- Cartas a mi padre, 2007 (published posthumously)
