= Carlos Mendy =

Uruguayan-born actor

- Born: 1929 (age 96–97); Montevideo, Uruguay
- Other name: Carlos Mendi
- Occupation: Actor
- Years active: 1954– (film)

Carlos Mendy (1929–2002) is a Uruguayan-born stage, film and television actor. He first moved to Argentina and then on to Spain where he enjoyed his greatest success. He is sometimes credited as Carlos Mendi.

== Filmography ==
Year	Title	Role	Notes
1952	La niña de fuego		
1954	Somos todos inquilinos		
1956	La fierecilla domada	Jerónimo, pretendiente de Blanca	
1957	La cárcel de cristal		
1957	Un tesoro en el cielo	Antonio	
1958	Distrito quinto	Andrés	
1959	Salto a la gloria	Dr. Ferran	
1959	A Glass of Whiskey	Raúl Chaco	
1959	Un hecho violento	Sacerdote	
1959	Back to the Door	Perico	
1960	El Asalto		
1960	Maria, Registered in Bilbao	Rogelio	
1960	Gaudí	Antonio Gaudí	
1961	Taxi for Tobruk	German Soldier in Desert with von Stegel	Uncredited
1961	Kilómetro 12		
1963	Mathias Sandorf	Ferrato	
1963	The Blackmailers	Torralbo	
1963	Vida de familia	Eduardo	
1965	Currito of the Cross	Pintao	Uncredited
1966	Mutiny at Fort Sharpe		
1966	La Barrera	Lucas	
1966	Operación Plus Ultra		
1967	Cristina	Octavio	
1967	Sor Citroën	Cirujano	
1967	Los guardiamarinas	Comandante segundo	
1967	Los chicos del Preu	Juan, padre de Andrés	
1967	Club de solteros		
1968	Persecución hasta Valencia	Andrés	
1968	No le busques tres pies...	Coronel	
1969	Las amigas	D. Alberto	
1969	Kiss Me Monster	Anführer der Abilenen	
1969	Las nenas del mini-mini	Padre de Mari	
1970	El abominable hombre de la Costa del Sol	D. Joaquín - director del hotel	
1972	Experiencia prematrimonial	Profesor Escuela de Arquitectura	
1973	No encontré rosas para mi madre	Commissary	
1975	School of Death	George Allen / Bob Williams	
1976	La Carmen	Sr. Jiménez	
1976	Mauricio, mon amour		
1976	La menor		
1981	El poderoso influjo de la luna	Raimundo	
1982	Buscando a Perico		
1985	Dirty Game in Casablanca	Edwards	
1986	Romanza final	Don Conrado	

== Bibliography ==
- Florentino Soria. José María Forqué. Editora Regional de Murcia, 1990.
