= La Gira (TV series) =

Spanish television series

- English Logo
- Theme music composer: Aris Archontis, Chen Neeman & Jeannie Lurie
- Opening theme: "A Girar" performed by Lucia Gil & Paula Dalli
- Country of origin: Spain
- No. of seasons: 2
- No. of episodes: 52

Production
- Running time: Approx 8-12 minutes

Original release
- Network: Disney Channel Spain
- Release: 4 March 2011 – 12 July 2013

La Gira (English: The Tour) is a Spanish television series which premiered in 2011, created and produced by Capitán Araña for Disney Channel Spain. Its premiere was on March 4, 2011. Obtaining this way the maximum number of audience of the season for Disney Spain. Also, following the success of the series, adaptations have been made, such as In tour from Italy and On tour from the Netherlands.

The project has a cast composed of actors such as Lucía Gil, winner of the first edition of My Camp Rock in Spain, Paula Dalli, finalist of the same contest, Daniel Sánchez and Ramón San Román. Others like Andrea Guasch (Cambio de Clase), along with other youth actors such as Jorge Clemente and Alba Celma. Along with them in the role of the adults in the series, such as José Ramón Iglesias, Raquel Infante and José María Sacristán.

The first season of La gira consists of 26 episodes of about 6–8 minutes in length. The second season of La Gira consists of 26 episodes, broadcast in pairs of about 8–20 minutes and also ended on 12 July 2013.

The music CD of the series was released on 03/13/2012

== Cast ==
=== Pop4U ===
- Lucía Gil as Laura. She is the lead vocalist of the Pop4U. She likes Lucas (Jorge Clemente). She is always singing with joy with her group; she is the member of the Pop4U who has more fans. She is the youngest of the group and cast.
- Paula Dalli as Carolina. She is the singer and guitarist of the Pop4U. She is responsible, very hardworking and a hysterical of the order. She is madly in love with Bruno, and she tries to say it several times, without success, because he doesn't think about her that way. In the last chapter of the series, Bruno is kissed.
- Daniel Sanchez Garcia (Dani Sanchez) as Bruno. He is the guitarist of the Pop4U. He is lazy and very fond of making heavy jokes. He is the handsome of the group and the only boy, until the arrival of Alex. He likes Carol because in some episodes he is annoyed and jealous of the friendship between Carol and Alex; but he still doesn't have it very clear. In the last chapter of "La Gira" he discovers that he is in love with Carol and he kisses her.

=== Los Cuervo ===
- Andrea Guasch as Sara. She is the singer and leader of Los Cuervo. She is presumptuous, mean and capricious. She hates the success of the Pop4u and will do anything to annoy them. She is the sister of Lucas and Marcos. She can't stand Laura being the leader of the tour.
- Jorge Clemente as Lucas. He is the bassist of Los Cuervo. He's the best of his brothers. If it were up to him, he would leave the group and dedicate himself to technology. Sometimes he can't compete with his brothers. He doesn't realize that Laura loves him. He's the youngest of Los Cuervo.
- Ramón San Román as Marcos. He's the drummer for Los Cuervo. Despite his age, he has a very childish mentality. He is the eldest of his siblings.

=== Secondary characters ===
- Alba Celma as Maika (seasons 1–2): She is the number 1 fan of the Pop4U. She is obsessed with the group. In the second season, she's in charge of the fan zone.
- Pablo Raya as Álex (season 2): He is the dancer and choreographer of the Pop4U and Los Cuervo concerts. He's creative, optimistic and can't stay still. He will approach Carol and Bruno will be very jealous.
- Jose Ramón Iglesias as Charly (seasons 1–2): He is the manager of the Pop4U. He cares a lot about the money and the fame of the Pop4U.He doesn't want to spend more than necessary.
- Alejandro Menéndez as Edy (season 2): He is the #1 fan of Los Cuervo. He likes Sara.
- Raquel Infante as Gloria (season 1): She is the choreographer of the Pop4U and Los Cuervo.
- Jose María Sacristán as Julio (season 1): He is the driver of the motorhome and Maika's father.

=== Episodic Characters ===
- José Carlos Robles as Civil Guard 1
- Carlos Matas as Civil Guard 2
- Carlos Bernardo Rodríguez as choreographer
- Aaron Colston as Aaron, (Pop4U's dancer)
- Lucía Guerrero as Bruno's sister
- Antonio Garcia as Civil Guard 3
- Miguel Insúa as the father of Bruno
- Jose Manjavacas as a photographer
- Antonio Chamorro as an old man
- Maarten Dannenberg as Laura's hairdresser
- Arantxa De Juan as Paloma Cuervo, (mother of Los Cuervo)
- Nestor Gutierrez as a chess player
- Paula Argüelles as a fan of Pop4U
- Pablo Pinedo as Mister Carlos, (Laura's first manager)

=== Special collaborations ===
- David Bustamante as himself
- Luis Fernández Estébanez as himself
- Cristina Alcázar as Trini
- Tony Aguilar as radio announcer
- Octavi Pujades as "The Count"
- Leire Martínez as herself
- Manu Carreño as announcer of football match
- Almudena Cid as herself
- Elena Alberdi as Elena

== Soundtrack ==
The album of La Gira (Album Entitled La Gira Season 2 (Spanish Version)) contains songs sung by the fictional band Pop4u, and the special participation of the band, also fictional, Los Cuervo. Their CD contains 13 songs, while the DVD, 9 videos, 5 music videos and 4 concert clips. It was released on March 13, 2012, under the label EMI. After the purchase of the record company EMI (by Universal Music ) it was redistributed by Universal in 2016.

Disc 1 - CD

#	Song	Writers	Artists	Length
1	A girar	Aris Archontis, Jacobo Calderón, Jeannie Lurie, Chen Neeman, Alejandro Nogueras	Lucía Gil, Paula Dalli, Dani Sanchez	2:42
2	Me haces tan feliz	Aris Archontis, Jacobo Calderón, Jeannie Lurie, Chen Neeman, Alejandro Nogueras	Paula Dalli	3:18
3	Eléctrica	Aris Archontis, Jacobo Calderón, Jeannie Lurie, Chen Neeman, Alejandro Nogueras	Daniel Sánchez	2:54
4	Superstar	Jacobo Calderón, Jay L'Oreal (Jordan Dollar), Alejandro Nogueras, C. Dwight (Courtney Rashad Dwight)	Pop4U (Paula Dalli, Dani Sanchez, Lucía Gil)	3:10
5	Un beso	Aris Archontis, Jacobo Calderón, Jeannie Lurie, Chen Neeman, Alejandro Nogueras	Lucía Gil	2:58
6	Mi vida comienza aquí	Aris Archontis, Jacobo Calderón, Jeannie Lurie, Chen Neeman, Alejandro Nogueras	Paula Dalli	3:07
7	Inténtalo (Determinate Spanish Version)	Jacobo Calderón, Alejandro Nogueras, Niclas Molinder, Twin, Johan Alkenäs, Charlie Mason, Ebony Burks, Adam Hicks	Pop4U (Lucia Gil, Paula Dalli, Dani Sanchez	3:18
8	Esta vida es una carrera	Aris Archontis, Jacobo Calderón, Jeannie Lurie, Chen Neeman, Alejandro Nogueras	Andrea Guasch	2:06
9	Voy a subir	Aris Archontis, Jacobo Calderón, Jeannie Lurie, Chen Neeman, Alejandro Nogueras	Lucía Gil, Paula Dalli, Dani Sánchez	3:06
10	Tú eres mi canción	Aris Archontis, Jacobo Calderón, Jeannie Lurie, Chen Neeman	Lucía Gil	3:02
11	Cámbialo	Adam Anders, Peer Astrom, Jacobo Calderón, Nikki Hassman, Alejandro Nogueras	Paula Dalli	3:10
12	Preparados para volar	Aris Archontis, Jacobo Calderón, Jeannie Lurie, Chen Neeman, Alejandro Nogueras	Lucía Gil, Paula Dalli	2:57
13	Preparados para volar	Aris Archontis / Jacobo Calderón / Jeannie Lurie / Chen Neeman / Alejandro Nogueras	Andrea Guasch, Jorge Clemente, Ramon San Román	2:56

Disc 2 - Bonus DVD MUSICAL VIDEO:

#	Song	Writers	Artists	Length
1	A girar	Aris Archontis, Jacobo Calderón, Jeannie Lurie, Chen Neeman, Alejandro Nogueras	Lucía Gil, Paula Dalli, Dani Sanchez	2:42
2	Inténtalo (Determinate Spanish Version)	Jacobo Calderón, Alejandro Nogueras, Niclas Molinder, Twin, Johan Alkenäs, Charlie Mason, Ebony Burks, Adam Hicks	Pop4U (Lucía Gil, Paula Dalli, Dani Sanchez)	3:18
3	Esta vida es una carrera	Aris Archontis, Jacobo Calderón, Jeannie Lurie, Chen Neeman, Alejandro Nogueras	Lucía Gil, Paula Dalli	2:06
4	Tú eres mi canción	Aris Archontis, Jacobo Calderón, Jeannie Lurie, Chen Neeman	Lucía Gil	3:02
5	Cámbialo	Adam Anders, Peer Astrom, Jacobo Calderón, Nikki Hassman, Alejandro Nogueras	Paula Dalli	3:10

Concert Clips

#	Song	Writers	Artists	Length
1	Me haces tan feliz	Aris Archontis, Jacobo Calderón, Jeannie Lurie, Chen Neeman, Alejandro Nogueras	Paula Dalli	3:18
2	Superstar	Jacobo Calderón, Jordan Dollar, Courtney "BLAQSMURPH" Dwight, Alejandro Nogueras	Pop4U (Lucía Gil, Paula Dalli, Dani Sanchez	3:10
3	Voy a subir	Aris Archontis, Jacobo Calderón, Jeannie Lurie, Chen Neeman, Alejandro Nogueras	Lucía Gil, Paula Dalli, Dani Sánchez	3:06
4	Preparados para volar	Aris Archontis, Jacobo Calderón, Jeannie Lurie, Chen Neeman, Alejandro Nogueras	Lucía Gil, Paula Dalli	2:57

In mid-2011 they recorded the songs of the series in English among which are Drive, One Kiss, Life's Gonna Happen, Ours To Win, Worthwhile, Electric, Superstar (English Version), I'm Going Up and Try Again. This was confirmed on Twitter by Paula Dalli, one of the protagonists of the series and one of the members of the fictional group "Pop4U". To this day Disney has only released Drive through iTunes on the EP La Gira.

In addition to the songs released there are alternate versions of them interpreted by the cast of the series, among them "Un Beso" interpreted by Daniel Sánchez, "Superstar" by Lucía Gil and "Eléctrica" by Lucía Gil. This is verifiable in the episodes of the series but the full versions were never released.

On December 14, 2011, Disney Channel Spain release on its YouTube channel a Christmas carol performed by Pop4U entitled "Feliz Navidad Te Deseo Cantando" composed by Jacobo Calderón and Alejandro Nogueras. This song despite having been created for a Disney Channel Christmas carol is registered by the record company Vivesporella (as can be seen in the registration of the song in SGAE).

== Books ==
In 2011, two books were released on the series titled La Palabra de Maika: Todo sobre La Gira and La Gira: Libro de posters. In the first, Maika (the character played by Alba Celma), explains information about each of the characters (such as their favourite songs, their greatest fears, memories of their lives before they became famous...) and information about the motorhome. The second includes 16 posters and 8 postcards exclusive to the series. The two books were released by Disney Publishing Disney Book.
