= Neox Fan Awards 2014 =

Spanish entertainment awards ceremony

3rd Neox Fan Awards
- Date: October 8, 2014
- Site: Teatro Compac, Madrid
- Hosted by: Cristina Pedroche & Anna Simon
- Organized by: Atresmedia

Television coverage
- Channel: Neox
- Ratings: 2.8%

This was the third edition of the Neox Fan Awards, created in Spain by Atresmedia with the sponsorship of The Coca-Cola Company's Fanta, for teenage audiences to honor the best of the year in television, films, music and sports. The show featured live musical performances by Abraham Mateo, Lucía Gil, Sweet California and Auryn.

== Presenters ==
- Frank Blanco
- María Castro
- Javier Gutiérrez
- Raúl Arévalo
- Ruth Lorenzo
- Xuso Jones
- Raúl Fernández
- Patrick Criado
- Nerea Camacho
- Arantxa Martí
- Sandra Martín
- Arturo Valls
- Manel Fuentes
- Abraham Mateo
- Lucía Gil
- Santiago Segura
- Rush Smith
- JPelirrojo
- RoEnLaRed
- Chusita Fashion Fever
- Curricé

== Awards ==
=== Film ===
Best Spanish film
Winner	Finalists	Eliminated before final round
Three Many Weddings	Witching and Bitching; Family United; Ismael; Zip & Zap and the Marble Gang	Por un puñado de besos; Kamikaze; La vida inesperada; Grand Piano; Mindscape
Best Spanish film actor
Winner	Finalists	Eliminated before final round
Mario Casas	Paco León; Martiño Rivas; Hugo Silva; Raúl Arévalo	Patrick Criado; Quim Gutiérrez; Álex García; Javier Gutiérrez; Daniel Cerezo
Best Spanish film actress
Winner	Finalists	Eliminated before final round
María Castro	Inma Cuesta; Marta Hazas; Patricia Conde; Arantxa Martí	Sandra Martín; Leticia Dolera; Verónica Echegui; Alicia Rubio; Bárbara Santa-Cruz

=== Music ===
Best group of the year
Winner	Finalists	Eliminated before final round
Auryn	Sweet California; Crítica y Sayk; The Vamps; Clover	Andy & Lucas; Fangoria; Efecto Mariposa; Lagarto Amarillo; El Viaje de Elliot
Best singer of the year
Winner	Finalists	Eliminated before final round
Abraham Mateo	Pablo Alborán; Xuso Jones; Dani Martín; David Bustamante	Paula Rojo; David Bisbal; Romeo Santos; Juan Magan; Soraya
Best song of the year
Winner	Finalists	Eliminated before final round
Auryn - Breathe your fire	Enrique Iglesias - Bailando; Xriz - Oye niña; Pharrell Williams - Happy; Abraham Mateo - Lánzalo	David Bisbal - No amanece; David Bustamante - Feliz; Nancys Rubias - Me encanta; Juan Magan - Falling in love; Jadel - Dile que tú
This Is My Song award
Winner	Finalists	Eliminated before final round
Pablo Alborán - Éxtasis	Malú - A prueba de ti; Dani Martín - Emocional; Passenger - Let her go; Birdy - Wings	Antonio Orozco - Temblando; Manuel Carrasco - Aprieta; Laura Pausini & Alejandro Sanz - Víveme; David DeMaría & Leire Martínez - No te marches jamás; Natalia Jiménez - Creo en mí
Best new act of the year
Winner	Finalists	Eliminated before final round
Porta	Xriz; Ariana Grande; Austin Mahone; Dvicio	5 Seconds of Summer; Fraag Malas; Amelie; María Sagana; Mr. Kilombo

=== Television ===
Best television programme
Winner	Finalists	Eliminated before final round
Tu cara me suena	Me resbala; El Hormiguero; Zapeando; Ahora caigo	Los mayores gamberros; Atrapa un millón; Pesadilla en la cocina; La ruleta de la suerte; Top Chef
Best television host
Winner	Finalists	Eliminated before final round
Arturo Valls	Pablo Motos; Manel Fuentes; Frank Blanco; Mónica Naranjo	Jorge Fernández; Carlos Sobera; Jordi Évole; Alberto Chicote; Andreu Buenafuente
Best television series
Winner	Finalists	Eliminated before final round
Velvet	Vive cantando; Con el culo al aire; Bienvenidos al Lolita; Sin identidad	El tiempo entre costuras; El secreto de Puente Viejo; El corazón del océano; Rescatando a Sara; Amar es para siempre
Best television series actor
Winner	Finalists	Eliminated before final round
Maxi Iglesias	Raúl Fernández; Miguel Ángel Silvestre; Hugo Silva; Raúl Arévalo	Jordi Coll; Miguel Ángel Muñoz; Daniel Grao; Gorka Otxoa; Peter Vives
Best television series actress
Winner	Finalists	Eliminated before final round
Megan Montaner	María León; María Castro; Paula Echevarría; Carmen Ruiz	Adriana Ugarte; Manuela Velasco; Verónica Sánchez; Loreto Mauleón; Belén Lopez
Best Game of Thrones character
Winner	Finalists	Eliminated before final round
Daenerys Targaryen	Jon Snow; Tyrion Lannister; Arya Stark; Cersei Lannister	Robb Stark; Bran Stark; Sansa Stark; Jaime Lannister; Joffrey Baratheon

=== Neox awards ===
Best kiss of the year
Winner	Finalists	Eliminated before final round
Pablo Motos & Miguel Ángel Silvestre	Mónica Naranjo & Llum Barrera; Miguel Ángel Silvestre & Paula Echevarría; Hiba Abouk & Antonio Orozco; Megan Montaner & Daniel Grao	Peter Vives & Adriana Ugarte; Hugo Silva & Ingrid Rubio; Quim Gutiérrez & Inma Cuesta; Natalia Verbeke & Roberto Álamo; Álex García & Verónica Echegui
Best body of the year
Winner	Finalists	Eliminated before final round
Rodrigo Guirao	Martiño Rivas; Cristina Pedroche; Edurne; Hugo Silva	Miguel Ángel Silvestre; Irina Shayk; Álex García; Manuela Vellés; Arantxa Martí
Best selfie
Winner	Finalists	Eliminated before final round
Auryn	Shakira & Gerard Piqué; Miguel Ángel Silvestre & Maxi Iglesias; Paula Echevarría & David Bustamante; Lucía Gil	Úrsula Corberó; Cristina Pedroche; Dani Mateo; Berta Collado; Alejandra Castelló
Star of the year
Winner	Finalists	Eliminated before final round
Àngel Llàcer	Santiago Segura; Dani Mateo; Pablo Ibáñez "El Hombre de Negro"; Anabel Alonso	Conchita Wurst; Nancys Rubias; Berto Romero; Joaquín Reyes; Josie
Most tweeted about guest
Abraham Mateo
