= Sweet Hours =

Sweet Hours (Dulces horas)
- Directed by: Carlos Saura
- Written by: Carlos Saura
- Starring: Iñaki Aierra; Assumpta Serna
- Release date: 1982
- Country: Spain
- Language: Spanish

Sweet Hours (Dulces horas) is a 1982 Spanish film, written and directed by Carlos Saura. The title comes from the words dulces horas de ayer (sweet hours of yesterday) in the soundtrack song Recordar (To Remember) sung by the soprano Imperio Argentina.

== Plot ==
The past is a riddle to Juan, a well-off bachelor playwright aged around 40. He is obsessed by it, by memories of the older father who went off to Argentina with another woman and the lovely young mother who then committed suicide. He has written a play called Sweet Hours, which contains what he recalls as key scenes of his early life. The play is in rehearsal and he attends the sessions, watchful and absorbed. He is searching for something. Juan slips in and out of the acted reconstructions and his own not necessarily reliable memories of childhood during the Spanish Civil War and its aftermath. Prodded by his sister Marta, who neither idolised her mother nor was her pampered darling, Juan begins to see that under her beauty and charm his mother was selfish and manipulative, driving her husband away and by her suffocating affection warping her son for life. Berta, the stunning young actress who is rehearsing the role of the mother and with whom he is falling in love, realises that for her and Juan to be happy together she must replace the dead mother. So the past repeats itself, inescapably it seems.

== Cast ==
- Iñaki Aierra : Juan
- Assumpta Serna : Berta/ his mother Teresa
- Álvaro de Luna : his uncle Pepe
- Jacques Lalande : his uncle Antoñito
- Alicia Hermida : his aunt Pilar
- Luisa Rodrigo : his grandmother
- Alicia Sánchez : Olga, the maid
- Pedro Sempson : his father
- Isabel Mestres : Marta, his sister
- Pablo Hernández Smith : the young Juan, called Juanico
- Magdalena García : the young Marta, called Martita

== Reception ==
The film was reviewed by Pauline Kael in The New Yorker; " This movie has the kind of subtle obviousness that is generally described as literate. What it comes down to is that Carlos Saura has a feeling for dark, autumnal elegance, and a dexterous technique that he puts at the service of tired ideas. What saves him from pedantry is that his films have occasional moments of erotic vibrancy. Scenes that aren't explicitly sexual in content are sexualized, so that they become ambiguous and disturbing - even haunting...In a Saura film, something more directly sexual is often impending; it hovers in the atmosphere. ..the wide-eyed Assumpta Serna, when she smiles, has a teasing elusiveness..She makes the atmosphere hum..perhaps Saura means us to see that the cycle is inescapable..The enigma of Saura is his addiction to enigma."
