= Porta (rapper) =

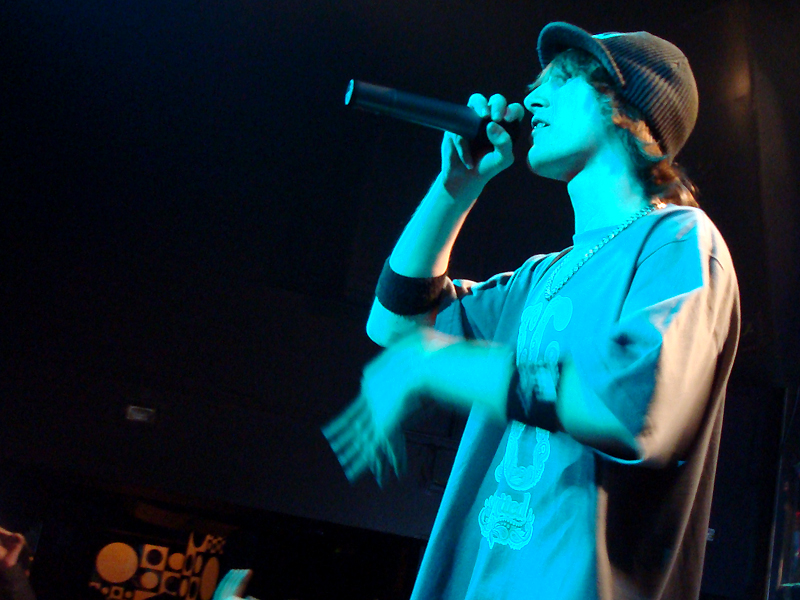
- Porta in 2008.

Background information
- Also known as: Porta, El Portador
- Born: Christian Jiménez Bundó; 2 July 1988 (age 38); Barcelona, Catalonia, Spain
- Genre: Hip hop
- Occupation: Rapper
- Years active: 2002–present
- Website: https://www.realporta.es/

Christian Jiménez Bundó (born 2 July 1988), known professionally as Porta, is a Spanish rapper.

== Early life and education ==
He was born in Sarrià, Barcelona.

== Career ==
His lyrics have sometimes been controversial, and have been criticised by the Instituto Nacional de las Mujeres (National Association of Women). At a concert in 2008 at Fórum de la Fnac in A Coruña, there was fighting in the audience between his supporters and those who disliked him.

Porta won a Neox Fan Award in 2014.

His song "Dragon Ball Rap", based on the television anime series Dragon Ball, was the third most watched video on YouTube in 2010 in Spain.

== Discography ==
- "No es cuestión de edades" (2006)
- "No hay truco" (2007)
- "En boca de tantos" (2008)
- "Trastorno bipolar" (2009)
- "RESET" (2012)
- "Algo ha cambiado" (2014)
- "Equilibrio" (2016)

== See also ==
- Spanish hip hop
