= Black Angel (1978 film) =

1978 film

- Spanish: Ángel negro
- Directed by: Tulio Demicheli
- Written by: Tulio Demicheli
- Produced by: Fabiola Falcón
- Cinematography: Hans Burmann
- Music by: Adolfo Waitzman
- Production companies: Producciones Escorpión; Ízaro Films
- Release date: 10 July 1978
- Running time: 88 minutes
- Countries: Mexico; Spain
- Language: Spanish

Black Angel (Spanish: Ángel negro) is a 1978 action-thriller film written and directed by Tulio Demicheli. It was a co-production between Mexico and Spain. A man seeks revenge for the assassination of his father.

== Cast ==
- Carlos Ballesteros
- Carlos Bracho
- Sandra Mozarowsky
- Carlos Muñoz
- Mónica Randall
- Jorge Rivero
- Lyda Zamora
