= Curro Jiménez =

- Written by: Antonio Larreta
- Directed by: Antonio Drove; Mario Camus; Joaquín Romero Marchenet
- Starring: Sancho Gracia; Álvaro de Luna; Eduardo García; José Sancho
- Theme music composer: Waldo de los Ríos
- Country of origin: Spain
- Original language: Spanish
- No. of seasons: 3
- No. of episodes: 40

Production
- Production company: Televisión Española

Original release
- Network: TVE1

Curro Jiménez is a Spanish television historical drama series that was first broadcast on La Primera Cadena of Televisión Española from December 22, 1976 to March 25, 1978.

Its main theme was Andalusian "bandolerismo" (bandit lifestyle) in the 19th century, located in the Ronda mountains. The main characters were four bandits, Curro Jiménez (the romantic prototype of the Andalusian "bandolero", El Algarrobo ("the Carob tree"), El Gitano ("the Gipsy") and El Estudiante ("the Student").

The series consisted of 40 episodes, in three seasons, and a movie. It was followed by a 12 episodes sequel aired in 1995 on Antena 3.

== Plot ==
The plot changed in every episode, but common themes involved a romantic bandit, righteous and good-natured, the guerrilla against the French troops during the Spanish War of Independence, love stories, battles against injustice, in addition to comedic episodes.

== Cast ==
Sancho Gracia played Curro Jiménez, Álvaro de Luna played El Algarrobo, José Sancho played El Estudiante and Francisco Algora played El Fraile. The character of El Fraile was replaced after the first season by El Gitano, played Eduardo García.

== Curro Jiménez in real life ==
The name Curro Jiménez is taken from the nickname of a real bandit also known as "el barquero de Cantillana" or "Andrés el Barquero", though his real name was Francisco López Jiménez.

He was born in Cantillana (Seville) in 1819 and was shot dead by the Guardia Civil in November 1849, after being given away by one of his comrades.
