= Josefina Echánove =

Mexican actress (1928–2020)

- Born: Josefina Rojas Hudson; July 21, 1926; New York City, US
- Died: December 29, 2020 (aged 94); Ciudad de México, Mexico

Josefina Echánove (born Josefina Rojas Hudson; 21 July 1926 – 29 December 2020) was a Mexican film, television and stage actress. She received two Ariel Award nominations for her acting roles.

== Early life ==
Echánove was born in New York City, US. She studied journalism at Universidad Femenina de México in Mexico City and later changed her major to dance. She went on to found the Contemporary Dance Academy of the University of Guanajuato.

== Acting career ==
Her acting career began with roles in the Entremeses Cervantinos, which later became the International Cervantino Festival. She went on to appear in more than 40 films (both Mexican and American), and more than 40 television soap operas. She was twice nominated for Best Actress in a Picture at the Ariel Awards: in 1991 for Por tu maldito amor, by Rafael Villaseñor Kuri and in 1993 for Serpientes y Escaleras (Serpents and Stairs), by Busi Cortés.

One of her most notable stage performances was in 1985, when she appeared in the play La fiera del Ajusco by Mexican playwright Víctor Hugo Rascón Banda.

=== Selected films ===
- El hombre de los hongos (1976)
- The Children of Sanchez (1978)
- Border Cop (1979)
- Missed (1982)
- The Honorary Consul (1983)
- Amityville 3-D (1983) as Dolores
- Old Gringo (1989)
- Cabeza de Vaca (1991)
- Perdita Durango (1997)
- The Other Conquest (1998)
- Santitos (1999)
- Todos hemos pecado (2008)

=== Selected television series ===
- Cuna de Lobos (1986) as Elvia
- La Dueña (Mexico) (1995) as Martina
- Cañaveral de Pasiones (1996) as Remedios
- Rubí (2004) as Pancha Muñoz
- Mañana es para siempre (2009) as Rosenda
- Corazón salvaje (2010) as Kuma

== Personal life ==
She married lawyer Alonso Echánove, and together they had two daughters and one son. Their oldest son, Alonso Echánove, is an actor. Their daughters are journalist Peggy Echánove and pop singer Marisol de las Mercedes Echánove, professionally known as María del Sol.
