= Dos gemelas estupendas =

Spanish-Mexican musical comedy film

- Poster
- Directed by: Miguel Morayta
- Written by: Carlos León, Carlos Enrique Taboada, Miguel Morayta
- Starring: Pilar Bayona, Emilia Bayona, Alberto Vázquez
- Release date: 1968
- Running time: 109 minutes
- Countries: Spain, Mexico
- Language: Spanish

Dos gemelas estupendas (lit. 'Amazing twins'); released in Mexico as Vestidas y alborotadas) is a 1968 Spanish-Mexican musical comedy film, written and directed by Miguel Morayta, and starring Pili and Mili, and Alberto Vázquez.

== Cast ==
- Pilar Bayona
- Emilia Bayona
- Alberto Vázquez
- Fernando Luján
