= Un novio para dos hermanas =

- Directed by: Luis César Amadori
- Screenplay by: Luis César Amadori; Jesús María de Arozamena; Roberto Gómez Bolaños
- Story by: Luis César Amadori; Jesús María de Arozamena
- Produced by: Eduardo de la Barcena; Benito Perojo
- Starring: Pilar Bayona; Emilia Bayona; Joaquín Cordero; Ángel Garasa; Fernando Luján; Sara García; Mónica Serna
- Cinematography: Ignacio Torres
- Edited by: Rafael Ceballos
- Music by: Manuel Esperón
- Production companies: Oro Films; Producciones Benito Perojo
- Distributed by: Dipenfa Filmayer Video S.A.
- Release date: July 6, 1967 (Mexico)
- Running time: 107 minutes
- Country: Mexico
- Language: Spanish

Un novio para dos hermanas ("A Boyfriend for Two Sisters") is a 1967 Mexican film written by Roberto Gómez Bolaños, directed by Luis César Amadori, and starring Pili and Mili, Joaquín Cordero, Ángel Garasa, Fernando Luján, Sara García and Mónica Serna.

== Cast ==
- Pilar Bayona as Pili García
- Emilia Bayona as Mili García
- Joaquín Cordero as Rodolfo Cáceres / 'Mil Usos'
- Ángel Garasa as Don Ángel de los Rios
- Fernando Luján as Fernando Martínez Dávila
- Sara García as Sra. Cáceres
- Carlos Riquelme
- Mónica Serna as Señorita '27'
- René Cardona as Sr. Mateos
- Evangelina Elizondo
- León Escobar as Coreógrafo
- Angelines Fernández as Profesora de piano
- Agustín Isunza as Dueño de restaurante
- Carlos Nieto as Doctor
- Ramón G. Larrea as Vigilante
- Carlos Bravo y Fernández as Invitado
- Julián de Meriche as Don Vladimiro
- María Antonieta de las Nieves
- Ana María Hernández
