= Lucía Gil =

Spanish singer and actress

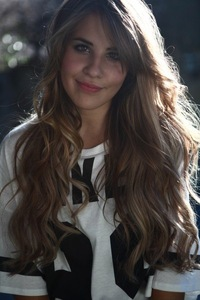
- Lucia Gil

Background information
- Born: Lucía Gil Santiago; 29 May 1998 (age 27); Madrid, Spain
- Genres: Pop, dance pop, pop rock
- Occupations: Singer, actress
- Years active: 2009–present

Lucía Gil Santiago (Spanish pronunciation: [luˈθi.a ˈxil sanˈtjaɣo]; born 29 May 1998 in Madrid) is a Spanish singer and actress, best known for winning the first season of the Spanish version of the Disney Channel singing competition My Camp Rock. She has also starred in several TV series, including Gran Reserva and La Gira.

== Biography ==
Although Lucía Gil first rose to fame when she won the first season of the Spanish version of My Camp Rock in 2009, by that time she had already participated in the TV singing competition Veo Veo at the age of seven and had uploaded multiple videos of cover songs on YouTube. In 2009, at the age of 10, she entered the competition My Camp Rock produced by Disney Channel Spain. She advanced to the semifinals and then the finals. Having received the most votes on the Disney Channel Spain website, she became the winner.

Also in 2009, Gil was called by RTVE to play the part of the daughter of one of the two protagonist families in the TV series Gran Reserva. It was premiered on La 1 in 2010 and gained Lucía more fame, but her character was killed in an accident at the end of the first season. Presently, she acts in two TV series, La Gira, produced by Disney Channel Spain, and Violetta, produced by Disney Channel Latin America. For La Gira ("The Tour"), which is about musicians and in which Lucía plays one of the main characters, the singer of the band Pop4U, she recorded several songs.

As of May 2013, Gil is filming a TV series called The Avatars. The series is in English, with American actors, and is aimed at the international market. It is produced by the Spanish company Portocabo and is being filmed in Spain. There is already a preliminary agreement to broadcast it in Italia on Rai Kids and in Germany. Lucía is playing Carmen, a videoblogger and fan of a band called The Avatar. Carmen will come to USA to meet her favourite band and will join the fight against other girls for the heart of the main guy protagonist.

== Fan following ==
Fans of Lucía Gil call themselves lugilators.

== Filmography ==
=== Television ===
Year	Title	Role	Notes
2009	My Camp Rock	Participant	Singing competition on Disney Channel Spain. Winner.
2010	Gran Reserva	Claudia	TV series on TVE. First season.
2010	My Camp Rock 2	Host	Singing competition on Disney Channel Spain
2011–2013	La Gira	Laura	Disney Channel Spain series
2011	Pizzicato	Host	Musical program on La 2 (TVE)
2012–2015	Violetta	Lena	Disney Channel Latin America series
2013	La Gira: Luces Camara Accion	Host	Singing competition on Disney Channel Spain
2013	Esperando a Violetta	Host	Series of five Disney Channel Spain specials
2014–present	The Avatars	Carmen	Spanish TV series in English
2014	#XQEsperar?	Lucía	Interactive series

== Discography ==
=== Albums ===
Title	Album details	Charts
Title	Album details	SPA
Más allá del país de las princesas	Released: 25 November 2013; Label: Lugilator Records / Boa Music; Format: CD, digital distribution	45

=== Soundtracks (with the band Pop4U) ===
Title	Album details	Charts
Title	Album details	SPA
La gira: English title: La Gira Season 2 (Spanish Version)	Soundtrack to the Disney Channel Spain series La Gira; Released: 12 March or 13, 2012; Label: Walt Disney Records / EMI Music Spain S.A.; Format: CD, digital distribution	12

=== Songs ===
Singles
Year	Song	Notes
2009	«Blanca Navidad»	With Ismael García
2010	«Tú eres mi canción»	Spanish version of «You're My Favorite Song»
2010	«Cuando estamos juntos (From "Toy Story 3")»	Song with Ismael Garcia, Alex de la Iglesia, Ana Milán, Diego El Cigala, Emilio Gutiérrez Caba, Flipy, Fofito, Jose Luis Gil & Manu Carreño.
2011	«A girar»	With Pop4U
2011	«Drive»	With Pop4U
2011	«Esta vida es una carrera»	With Pop4U
2011	«Ours To Win»	With Pop4U
2011	«Un Beso»	With Pop4U
2011	«One Kiss»	With Pop4U
2011	«Make a Wave»	-With Daniel Sánchez García
2011	«Inténtalo»	Spanish version of «Determinate» (Whit Pop4U)
2011	«Feliz Navidad te deseo cantando»	Song for Christmas from 2011 with Pop4U
2011	«La lluvia»	Version of the song by Carlos Matarí with arrangements by María Villalón
2012	«Somos un equipo (From "Austin & Ally")»	Spanish version of «Can't Do It Without You» (With Pop4U & Breaking Ice)
2012	«Eléctrica»	With Pop4U
2012	«Electric»	With Pop4U
2012	«Voy a subir»	With Pop4U
2012	«I'm Going Up»	With Pop4U
2012	«Preparados Para Volar»	With Pop4U
2012	«Try Again»	With Pop4U
2012	«Superstar (Lucía Gil Version)"»	With Pop4U
2012	«Eléctrica (Soloist Version of Lucía Gil)"»	With Pop4U
2013	«Perdí la apuesta»	Own compositions
2013	«Tu vas a ser para mí»	Own compositions
2013	«Mi calle sin ti»	Own compositions
2013	«Ya se te olvidó»	Own compositions
2013	«Como el humo del café»	Own compositions
2013	«Yo Quisiera»	Own compositions
2013	«Beyond the princesses'land»	Own compositions
2013	«Hoy vuelvo a empezar»	Own compositions
2013	«El Último Baile»	Song composed by María Villalón
2013	«Soy»	Composed by Álvaro Benito.
2013	«Las Mismas Estrellas»	Composed by the artist as a dedication to a friend who lives in Argentina
2013	«Siempre Estas Allí »	Cover of the song by Barón Rojo
2014	«#XQEsperar» (From "#XQEsperar2")	Opening of TV Series "#XQEsperar?2"
2015	«Perdidos»	With Christian Sánchez
2015	« Yo quisiera (Versión TV)»	Song composed by her and performed with Christian Sánchez
2015	«Ella es la tormenta»	Song composed by her
2015	«Mentiroso»	Song composed by her for the series "Yo Quisiera"
2015	«Pyromania»	Song composed by her for the series "Yo Quisiera"
2015	«Ojalá te vaya bien »	Song composed by her for the series "Yo Quisiera"
2015	«My World turn is now»	Song composed by her for the series "Yo Quisiera"
2015	«November Night»	Song composed by her for the series "Yo Quisiera"
2015	«Miedo»	Song composed by her for the series "Yo Quisiera"
2015	«Vuelvo a pensar en ti»	Song composed by her for the series "Yo Quisiera"
2015	«Rota»	Song composed by her and Melendi
2015	«Heroes»	Song with Christian Sánchez
2015	«Llegas y te vas»	Song composed by Christian Sánchez and sung by both
2015	«Hoy me toca reir»	Song composed by her and sung with Christian Sánchez
2015	«Nosotros sin nosotros»	Song composed by Christian Sánchez and sung by both
2015	«The woman power»	Song with Natalia Rodríguez
2016	«Fool 2 Try»	First single by the artist performed in English (Composed by Lucía with the artist Melendi)
2016	«Bésame»	Song with José de Rico
2017	«Hasta Que Salga El Sol»	Song with the band Atacados that is part of the soundtrack of the book with the same name by the writer Megan Maxwell
2017	«Taste The Feeling»	Recorded song for the brand Coca-Cola
2017	«Dragonfly»	Song composed by her
2017	«Cuando Deja De Llover»	Part of the soundtrack of the book "Hasta que salga el sol" by the writer Megan Maxwell
2017	«No Necesito A Nadie»	Part of the soundtrack of the book "Hasta que salga el sol" by the writer Megan Maxwell
2017	«Limites»	Song with Rosco
2018	«Seré»	Song composed by her whose video clip is created, produced and co-directed by her
2018	«Wake Up»	Opening theme of the series "Wake Up" that she performing with Andrea Guasch, Diego Domínguez and Chanel Terrero.
2018	«Flashback»	Song composed by her
2018	«Tus Labios Rojos»	Song with Salvador Beltrán
2018	«El Chiringuito de Jugones»	Opening theme of the Football TV program "El Chiringuito De Jugones" performed with DavidDeMaria, Willy Bárcenas, Hugo Salazar, Dmontoya, Edu Del Val and Fernando Fu.
2019	«Lo que es nuestro»	Song composed by her sister Natalia Gil and performed by both
2019	«The Show Must Go On»	Song with CoolKillers
2020	«Volveremos a brindar»	Song about the Coronavirus Quarantine composed by herself and published in social networks

== Awards and nominations ==
Year	Award	Category	Result
2014	Premios TeenWeekly 2014	Best Female Singer	Nominated
2014	Neox Fan Awards 2014	Most Handsome/Beautiful Selfie	Finalist
2014	Premios Star TV 2014	Best Juvenile Artist	Won
2016	Melty Future Awards 2016	Cool Is Everywhere	Nominated
2016	Nickelodeon Kids' Choice Awards 2016	Best Spanish Music Act	Won
