= Como dos gotas de agua =

1964 film

- Directed by: Luis César Amadori
- Screenplay by: José María Iglesias; Luis César Amadori
- Story by: Luis César Amadori
- Starring: Pilar Bayona; Emilia Bayona; Isabel Garcés; Manolo Morán; Luis Dávila
- Cinematography: Antonio L. Ballesteros
- Edited by: Antonio Ramírez de Loaysa
- Music by: Gregorio García Segura
- Production companies: Producciones Benito Perojo; Story Film-Pablo Núñez
- Distributed by: Columbia Pictures Corporation; Dipenfa Filmayer Video S.A.
- Release date: 30 January 1964 (Spain)
- Running time: 92 min

Como dos gotas de agua (lit. 'Like two drops of water') is a 1964 Spanish musical comedy film directed by Luis César Amadori and starring Pili and Mili and Isabel Garcés. This film marks the debut of twins sisters and actresses Pilar Bayona and Emilia Bayona (as Pili and Mili).

== Plot ==
The narrative centers on the convergent legal cases of two identical teenagers, Pili (Pilar Bayona) and Mili (Emilia Bayona).

Pili is a fifteen-year-old orphan raised by Gregorio (Manolo Morán), a traveling organ grinder seeking to place her in a state-run home. Conversely, Mili is the neglected daughter of a wealthy widower, Ricardo (Luís Dávila); she has been raised by her aunt Teresa (Susana Campos), who has long posed as her biological mother.

As Ricardo’s father initiates a custody battle for Mili, attorney Ángela Goñi (Isabel Garcés) discovers the girls' uncanny physical resemblance. Goñi strategically leverages this discovery in court to navigate the complex social and legal challenges facing both protagonists.

== Cast ==
- Pilar Bayona as Pili Benítez
- Emilia Bayona as Mili Arriaga
- Isabel Garcés as Ángela Goñi
- Manolo Morán as Gregorio 'El Chopín'
- Luis Dávila as Ricardo Arriaga
- Trini Montero as Marcela Bonelli
- Jaime Blanch as Raúl Arriaga
- Mariano Azaña as Juez Agustín Palacio
- Tony Soler as Magdalena
- José Morales as Secretario de Ángela
- Xan das Bolas as Martínez
- José Franco as Pepe el mayordomo
- Adrián Ortega as Alvareda
- Jesús Guzmán as Casimiro
- Jorge Llopis
- Mario Morales
- Heric Chapman as Mr. Carl Jones
- Inés Marco
- Emilio Gutiérrez Caba as Pretendiente de Pili
- Valentín Tornos as Ujier
- Miguel Armario
- Manuel Guitián
- Antonio Braña
- Victor Servant
- Susana Campos as Teresa
