= Pili and Mili =

Spanish comic duo

Pili y Mili
- Born: Pilar Bayona Sarriá and Aurora Bayona Sarriá; February 10, 1947 (age 79); Zaragoza, Aragón, Spain
- Occupations: Actresses; singers
- Years active: 1963–1970

Pili and Mili (Spanish: Pili y Mili) was a comic acting duo composed of twin sisters Pilar and Emilia (Aurora) Bayona (born February 10, 1947, in Zaragoza, Aragon, Spain). They rose to fame in the early 1960s, becoming one of the biggest stars of the "singing child prodigy" movie genre that enjoyed a boom at the time. Their movies were musical comedies based on the same formula of mistaken identities (twin-switching).

The twins were very popular in Spain, Argentina, Mexico and Italy, but their career was short, lasting only from 1963 to 1970. When the success formula ceased to work, the duo dissolved. Mili retired aged 22, but Pili continued her entertainment career.

== Filmography as Pili y Mili ==
=== Cinema ===
- 1963: Como dos gotas de agua (dir. by Luis César Amadori)
- 1964: Dos chicas locas, locas (dir. by Pedro Lazaga)
- 1965: Whisky y vodka (dir. by Fernando Palacios)
- 1965: Sharp-Shooting Twin Sisters (dir. by Rafael Romero Marchent)
- 1966: Scandal in the Family (dir. by Julio Porter)
- 1967: Un novio para dos hermanas (dir. by Luis César Amadori)
- 1968: Dos gemelas estupendas (dir. by Miguel Morayta Martínez), a.k.a. Vestidas y alborotadas
- 1968: Agáchate, que disparan (dir. by Manuel Esteba)
- 1969: Princesa y vagabunda (dir. by Miguel Morayta Martínez)
- 1970: La guerra de las monjas (dir. by José María Fernández Unsáin)

=== Television ===
- 1965: Sábado ´64

== Pilar's solo filmography ==
After the duo dissolved, Pilar continued a television career in Spain and Mexico alone. She also played in theater and appeared in a number of small roles in cinema. Without her sister Mili, she was credited as Pilar Bayona rather than just Pili.

- 1979: Los fieles sirvientes (dir. by Francesc Betriú)
- 1985: En penumbra (dir. by J. L. Lozano)

== Read more ==
- Jo Labanyi; Tatjana Pavlović (2012-08-31). A Companion to Spanish Cinema. John Wiley & Sons. ISBN 978-1-118-32280-2.
