= Kiss of the Tarantula =

1975 American horror film

Kiss of the Tarantula (released in the UK as Shudder) is a 1975 American horror film directed by Chris Munger.

== Summary ==
Susan Bradley (Suzanna Ling) is a teenager who punishes people who would either kill her mortician father John Bradley (Herman Wallner) or her pet spiders.

== Production ==
The film was shot at Columbus, Georgia. It was in development between 1972 and 1975 under its working title Tarantula with Carol Dunavan in the cast and John Hayes directing. Spider expert Jay Scott Neal provided the tarantulas and played the role of Bo Richards.

The film had its world premiere at the Columbus Square Twin Theatres in Columbus, Georgia, on September 26, 1975.

== Home video ==
It was released under the Scream Pack DVD by VCI Entertainment alongside Don't Look in the Basement and Don't Open the Door on October 31, 2006.

RiffTrax spoofed the film on January 30, 2015.

It was released on Blu-ray on January 22, 2019.
