= Beatriz (film) =

1976 film

- Directed by: Gonzalo Suárez
- Screenplay by: Santiago Moncada; Gonzalo Suárez
- Based on: Beatriz and Mi hermana Antonia by Ramón del Valle-Inclán
- Produced by: Julián Esteban; Luis Méndez
- Starring: Carmen Sevilla; Nadiuska; Jorge Rivero; Sandra Mozarowsky; José Sacristán
- Cinematography: Carlos Suárez
- Edited by: Antonio Gimeno
- Music by: Fermín Gurbindo
- Production company: Lotus Films
- Distributed by: Lotus Films
- Release date: 25 September 1976
- Running time: 85 minutes
- Countries: Spain; Mexico
- Language: Spanish

Beatriz is a 1976 horror film directed by Gonzalo Suárez which stars Sandra Mozarowsky as the title character alongside Carmen Sevilla, Nadiuska, Jorge Rivero, and José Sacristán. Set in a Spanish mountain village in the 19th century, the film follows Juan, a young boy whose teenage sister begins to suffer apparent possession after the arrival of a mysterious friar in the community. It is based on Ramón del Valle Inclán's stories Beatriz and Mi hermana Antonia.

Filmed in Spain, Beatriz was an international co-production between Spain and Mexico. The film's sets were designed by the art director Ramiro Gómez.

== Plot ==
Outside a mountain village in mid-19th-century Spain, young Juan witnesses a friar, Ángel, brutally murder several peasant thieves attempting to rob him, including the gang leader, Lorenzo del Quinto. Ángel leaves the scene after cutting off the ear of one of the men and storing it in his carrying bag. Ángel then arrives in the village where he quickly ingratiates himself into the local community, earning the trust and devotion of Juan's widowed mother, the benevolent countess Carlota, and his teenage sister, Beatriz.

Juan is suspicious of the friar's motives and believes him to be evil, but those around him dismiss his claims. One night, Juan finds Beatriz has disappeared from her bedroom, and finds her cat eating the dead thieve's ear. His mother believes it to be a dream moments before Beatriz begins screaming from her bedroom, apparently suffering a nightmare herself. As Beatriz begins to act strangely and suffering hallucinations, Carlota enlists the friar to help her daughter, whom she fears is suffering from some sort of demonic possession. Juan finds solace in Máximo, a local academic and librarian, but Carlota becomes enraged when she finds Máximo has decried her beliefs in the supernatural.

Meanwhile, Basilisa, the wife of the local blacksmith and a servant to Carlota, fears for her newborn son who is suffering illness. A local mystic who resides in a cave informs Basilisa that her son will die, and that Beatriz has fallen under the curse of a witch. Basilisa informs Juan of this, suspecting the ear Juan has talked of is hidden inside Beatriz's pillow, and is causing the spell. When Juan tells Basilisa he saw Beatriz's cat flee the room with the ear the night she became ill, Basilisa takes this as confirmation that the mystic's claims are false, and becomes ecstatic, believing her son too will be safe. The friar, who wishes to bring Beatriz closer to him, seeks refuge with the mystic who agrees to perform a spell, but he changes his mind. Beatriz's condition seems to improve, but Juan still feels his sister is under the influence of something otherworldly.

One stormy night, Lorenzo el Quinto's henchmen break into Carlota's home and demand food, threatening to murder Beatriz if their wishes are not honored. One of the thieves locks Juan inside a stall in the barn. Meanwhile, Máximo, seeking shelter from the storm, also arrives at the house unexpectedly. Carlota feeds the men and asks Máximo to stay. Tensions rise when one of the gang members attempts to assault Carlota, and Máximo is incapacitated and tied to a post after trying to intervene. Carlota remains stalwart, insisting on being charitable to the gang, who promise to leave before dawn. Máximo looks on as the gang attempt to rape Carlota, but they are interrupted by Basilisa, who hears the commotion and enters armed with a rifle. The men take the rifle from her and proceed to gang rape her. Using a sickle, Carlota frees Máximo, who fires the rifle, startling the men into leaving.

At dawn, el Quinto's gang members visit the mystic's mountain dwelling, which they stoke with hay and set afire, erroneously believing the friar is inside. Beatriz stumbles upon the scene, and witnesses the friar attack and murder the gang with an axe. After, Beatriz approaches the friar while he is bathing in a stream. She attempts to undress, but the friar rebuffs her. Shortly after, Juan is sent to live his aunt and uncle in Santiago.

== Cast ==
- Jorge Rivero as Fray Ángel
- Carmen Sevilla as Doña Carlota
- Nadiuska as Basilisa
- José Sacristán as Máximo Bretal
- Sandra Mozarowsky as Beatriz
- Elsa Zabala as Saludadora
- Óscar Martín as Juan
- Eduardo Bea as Tres Dedos
- Pedro Luis Lavilla as Gondarín
- Juan Antonio Peral as Pelos
- José Luis Velasco as Cepillo
- Sandalio Hernández as Cristamilde

== Production ==
Shooting locations included Monforte de Lemos.

== Release ==
Beatriz was released theatrically in Barcelona on 25 September 1976.

=== Home media ===
In 2023, Vinegar Syndrome made the film available on Blu-ray as part of their Villages of the Damned: Three Horrors from Spain, featuring it alongside similarly-themed folk horror films The Ancines Woods (1970) and The Sky is Falling (1975).

== See also ==
- List of Spanish films of 1976

== Bibliography ==
- Bentley, Bernard (2008). A Companion to Spanish Cinema. Boydell & Brewer.
- Guarinos, Virginia (1999). "Beatriz de Gonzalo Suárez". In Utrera, Rafael (ed.). 8 calas cinematográficas en la literatura de la generación del 98 – via Universidad de Sevilla.
