= Great Friends =

- Directed by: Luis Lucia
- Written by: Carlos María Ydígoras (novel); Juan Cobos; Leonardo Martín
- Produced by: Benito Perojo
- Starring: Nino Del Arco; Manuel Gil; Eva Guerr
- Cinematography: Francisco Fraile
- Edited by: Antonio Ramírez de Loaysa
- Music by: Gregorio García Segura
- Production company: Producciones Benito Perojo
- Distributed by: C.E.A. Distribución
- Release date: 11 December 1967
- Running time: 83 minutes
- Country: Spain
- Language: Spanish

Great Friends (Spanish: Grandes amigos) is a 1967 Spanish drama film directed by Luis Lucia and starring Nino Del Arco, Manuel Gil and Eva Guerr.

== Cast ==
- Nino Del Arco as Nino
- Manuel Gil as El Maestro
- Eva Guerr as La madre
- Julio Goróstegui as El Titiritero
- Antonio Moreno as El Maquinista
- Aníbal Vela as El Fogonero
- Blaki as El ferroviario
- Sergio Mendizábal as El Cura
- Emilio Rodríguez as El Camionero
- Ángel Luis Nolías
- Ángel León
- Luis María Hidalgo
- Ramón Fernández Tejela
- Manuel Guitián
- Rafael Alcántara
- Goyo Lebrero
- José Fernández
- Herminia Tejela
- Manolita Guerrero
- Peter Damon as El Pastor

== Bibliography ==
- Peter Cowie & Derek Elley. World Filmography: 1967. Fairleigh Dickinson University Press, 1977. ISBN 978-0-498-01565-6.
