= Satan's Children =

- Theatrical release poster
- Directed by: Joe Wiezycki
- Screenplay by: Gary Garrett; Ron Levitt
- Produced by: Joe Wiezycki
- Cinematography: John Makinen
- Edited by: Mike Consales
- Music by: Ray Fletcher
- Production company: Florida International Pictures
- Distributed by: Sterling International
- Release date: March 15, 1975
- Running time: 87 minutes
- Country: United States
- Language: English

Satan's Children is a 1975 American rape and revenge horror film directed by Joe Wiezycki and starring Stephen White, Eldon Mecham, and Joyce Molloy. Its plot follows a teenager who, after being subjected to a brutal gang rape, is taken in by a Satanic cult of young people.

== Plot ==
Bobby is a teenager who is bullied and sexually harassed by his older stepsister, Janis, and mistreated by his abusive stepfather. When Janis attempts to expose Bobby for the marijuana he has hidden in his bedroom, Bobby runs away and ends up at a local bar. There, he meets Jake, a seemingly benevolent adult who invites him home to spend the night. Once there, the man holds Bobby at knifepoint, and binds and gags him. Jake invites three other men to his house, and they drive through the country with Bobby, taking turns anally raping him in the car before leaving him on the side of a country road.

A cult of hippie Satanists find Bobby unconscious on the road while playing a game of football. Joshua, one of the cultists, objects to allowing Bobby to stay with them, deeming him a "queer", but Sherry sympathizes with Bobby, as she herself possesses same-sex desires, and, in the absence of the cult's leader, Simon, insists Bobby stay. When Simon returns, he finds the cult has committed several executions of its own members, and is displeased with Sherry's conduct in his absence, leading her to become a pariah among the other cult members. Even worse, she and Bobby have begun sleeping together, which furthers Simon’s jealousy.

Sherry is subjected to a series of cruel punishments, while Simon refuses to accept Bobby, believing him to be gay. Bobby manages to break free of the cult, who, in Sherry's absence, have also mistreated him, and flees into the woods. He evades several of the cultists who pursue him, and kills them. Bobby returns home, covered in mud, and murders his stepfather before kidnapping Janis. He drives to Jake's home and systematically shoots each of his rapists to death before decapitating their bodies. Bobby returns to the cult's compound with a bag containing the men's severed heads, which he shows Simon in an effort to prove his dedication. Bobby is reunited with Sherry and accepted into the cult. While Bobby and Sherry have sex, the other cult members crucify Janis, leaving her bloody corpse nailed to a cross.

== Cast ==
- Stephen White as Bobby Douglas
- Eldon Mecham as Mr. Douglas
- Joyce Molloy as Janis Douglas
- Kathleen Marie Archer as Sherry
- Rosemary Orlando as Monica
- Bob Barbour as Jake
- Robert C. Ray II as Simon
- John Edwards as Joshua
- Harry Williams as Old Man
- Mike Yeager as Driver

== Release ==
Satan's Children was given a sneak-preview release in LaSalle, Illinois on March 15, 1975, and was later released to drive-in theaters in Fort Worth, Texas on August 22, 1975.

=== Home media ===
Something Weird Video released the film as a double-feature DVD with Asylum of Satan on September 3, 2002. In 2022, Something Weird, in collaboration with the American Genre Film Archive (AGFA) issued a Blu-ray release of the film.
