= El Mariscal del infierno =

- Directed by: Leon Klimovsky
- Written by: Paul Naschy (as Jacinto Molina)
- Produced by: Nestor Gaffet; Jose Antonio Perez Giner
- Starring: Paul Naschy; Norma Sebre; Guillermo Bredeston; Mariano Vidal Molina; Graciela Nilson; Eduardo Calvo
- Cinematography: Francisco Sanchez
- Edited by: Antonio Ramirez de Loaysa
- Music by: Carlos Viziello
- Distributed by: Profilmes S.A. Barcelona; Orbe Prods. Buenos Aires
- Release date: 1974
- Running time: 95 minutes
- Countries: Spain; Argentina
- Language: Spanish

El mariscal del infierno (The Marshal From Hell), aka The Devil's Possessed, is a 1974 Spanish/Argentine co-production. It was a historical drama directed by Leon Klimovsky, written by Paul Naschy and co-produced by Nestor Gaffet and Jose Antonio Perez Giner. It starred Paul Naschy in the title role, and co-featured Norma Sebre and Guillermo Bredeston.

Naschy said he based the lead character Gilles de Lancre on the notorious medieval serial killer Gilles de Rais, and the film's plot was a loose remake of the 1956 Akira Kurosawa film Throne of Blood (itself an adaptation of Shakespeare's Macbeth).

It was filmed in May and June 1974, and was theatrically released only in Spain and Belgium that same year as El mariscal del infierno. It was released on VHS home video in the 1980s as The Devil's Possessed. There appears to have been a somewhat sexier "international version" of the film at one time, but it apparently no longer exists.

== Plot ==
In medieval France, the Baron Gilles de Lancre becomes obsessed with alchemy and black magic, and his wife (the sadistic Georgelle) encourages his interests, fooling him into believing that an alchemist friend of hers named Simon de Braqueville can change lead into gold if the Baron will supply him with a quantity of virgins' blood to use as an ingredient. The Baron orders his soldiers to kidnap any young virgins in the area, and his wife has the girls violently sacrificed in ways that satisfy her own sadistic urges.

Gaston de Malebranch, a young military hero in the Baron's army, returns home from a long journey, and begins to hear bizarre stories about the Baron and his wife sacrificing young maidens. Georgelle is afraid that de Malebranch might mess up their routine if he learns the truth about what they've been doing, so she tries to get the Baron to kill him, but the Baron refuses since de Malebranch had saved his life in the past.

Georgelle tells the Baron that she can arrange for the Devil himself to appear, and she tricks the Baron by putting the severed head of a young man on an altar while the alchemist hides behind the structure and uses ventriloquism to make it appear as if the head is speaking. The Baron has become so naive that he actually believes that he is talking to the Devil.

In the end, de Malebranch leads a revolt against the Baron and he and his men lay siege to the castle. The Baron takes on the whole group of rebels, thinking he has become invulnerable. He winds up riddled with arrows and dies, in a definite visual reference to Throne of Blood.

== Cast ==
- Paul Naschy as Barón Gilles de Lancré
- Norma Sebre as Georgelle
- Guillermo Bredeston as Gaston de Malebranche
- Eduardo Calvo as the alchemist Simon de Braqueville
- Mariano Vidal Molina as Sillé
- Graciela Nilson as Graciela
- Fernando Rubio as Estebano
- Luis Induni as Paul
- José Luis Chinchilla as Daniel
- Sandra Mozarowsky as the sacrificed girl
- Francisco Nieto
- Carmen Carro as Bastiana
- Germán Kraus
- Javier de Rivera
- César de Barona
- Toni de Mosul
- Emilio Mellado
- Luis González Páramo
- Simón Arriaga
- Juan Madrigal
- Fernando Villena
- Ana Farra
- Adela Vázquez
- Joaquín Solís
- Antonio Orengo
- María de los Ángeles Muñoz
- Jeanette Aristensen
- Jaime Morano
- Maria Giani

== Release ==
The film was released on Shout Factory's Blu-ray as part of their Paul Naschy Collection 2 set.
