= Dos chicas locas, locas =

- Poster
- Directed by: Pedro Lazaga
- Written by: Mariano Ozores
- Release date: 1964
- Running time: 112 minutes
- Country: Spain
- Language: Spanish

Dos chicas locas, locas (lit. 'Two really crazy girls') is a 1964 Spanish musical comedy film written by Mariano Ozores, directed by Pedro Lazaga and starring Pili and Mili, and Mari Carmen Prendes.

== Plot ==
The Catalonian Dictionary of Feature Films summarizes the plot like this: "Two rich twin heiresses live with their grandmother. When they turn sixteen, they decide to run away from home."

It is a comedy of situations.

In the movie, Pili and Mili play twins who have lived separately since an early age. The fate brings them together when their grandfather Diógenes dies, leaving his fortune to the eldest of them. The only person who knows who is the eldest is his widow, the twins' grandmother Rosa, and she takes them to live with her until they are old enough to claim the inheritance.

== Music ==
The music and songs for the soundtrack were provided by Waldo de los Ríos.

== Cast ==
- Pilar Bayona
- Emilia Bayona
- Tito Mora
- Miguel Ríos
- Mari Carmen Prendes
