= The First Adventure =

- Directed by: Tulio Demicheli
- Written by: Jesús María de Arozamena; Tulio Demicheli; Manuel Pombo Angulo
- Produced by: Javier L. de Toledo; Tulio Demicheli; Rosa Esteba; Alejandro Ortega Bueno
- Cinematography: José F. Aguayo
- Edited by: Sara Ontañón
- Music by: José Solá
- Production companies: Alpe Films; Profilms 21
- Distributed by: Bengala Film
- Release date: 20 November 1965
- Running time: 87 minutes
- Countries: Mexico; Spain
- Language: Spanish

The First Adventure (Spanish:La primera aventura) is a 1965 Mexican-Spanish adventure film directed by Tulio Demicheli and starring José Calvo, Nino Del Arco and Pedro Mari Sánchez.

== Cast ==
- José Calvo as Cosme
- Nino Del Arco as Child
- Pedro Mari Sánchez as Juan
- Marisenka Demoslawsky as Child
- Luis Induni
- Rafael Vaquero
- Mercedes Barranco
- Emilio García Domenech
- Narciso Ojeda
- Joaquín Burgos
- Miguel Armario
- Valentín Tornos as School teacher
- Roberto Cruz
- Manuel Alexandre as Remigio

== Bibliography ==
- John King & Nissa Torrents. The Garden of Forking Paths: Argentine Cinema. British Film Institute, 1988.
