= Nino del Arco =

Spanish actor

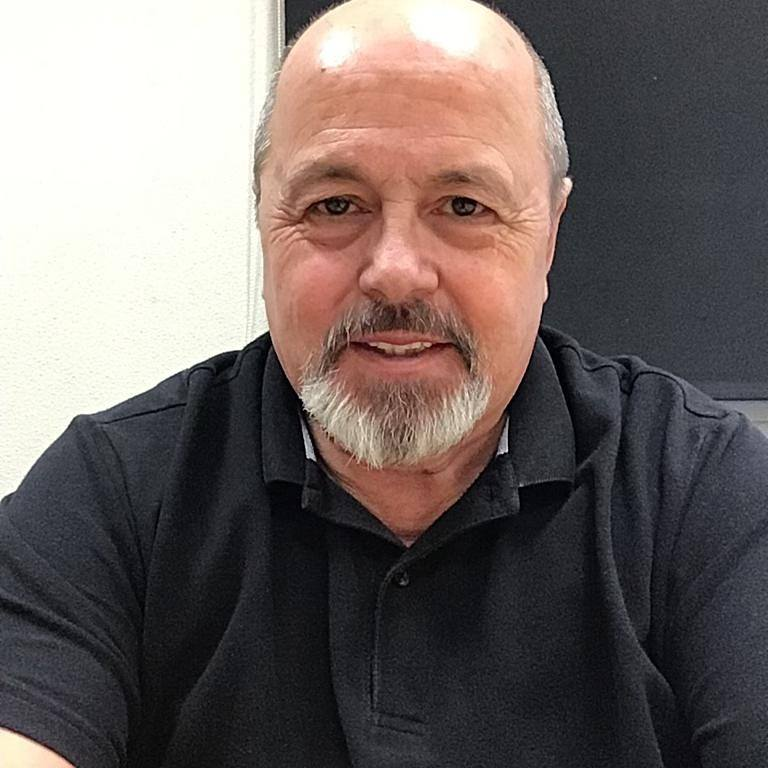
- Born: Leonardo del Arco Barrera; 6 September 1958 (age 67); Madrid, Spain
- Occupations: Actor and lawyer

Leonardo del Arco Barrera (known as Nino del Arco; born 6 September 1958) is a Spanish lawyer and former child actor.

He played Jesus alongside Daniel Martín and Marianne Koch in A Fistful of Dollars (1964) by Sergio Leone. He played Dieter in El niño y el muro (1965) by Ismael Rodríguez. He was the main character in El Cristo del océano (1971).

He played Pepín in La primera aventura (1965), and Juanito in La Gran Aventura (1969).

== Filmography ==
- A Fistful of Dollars (1964) as Jesus
- The Boy and the Ball and the Hole in the Wall (1965) as Dieter Smith
- La primera aventura (1965) as Pepín
- Grandes amigos (1967) as Nino Antonio
- La Gran Aventura (1969) as Juanito
- El niño y el potro (Más allá de río Miño) (1969) as Andresiño
- El Cristo del Océano (1971) as Pedrito
- Kalimán, el hombre increíble (1972) as Solín
- Code of Hunting (1983)
- Los ladrones van a la oficina (1994)
