= Teo el pelirrojo =

1985 film

- Directed by: Paco Lucio
- Starring: María Botto
- Edited by: Luis Manuel del Valle
- Release date: 1986
- Country: Spain
- Language: Spanish

Teo el pelirrojo is a 1986 Spanish drama film directed by Paco Lucio. It was entered into the 36th Berlin International Film Festival.

== Cast ==
- Nur Al Levi
- Juan Diego Botto
- María Botto
- Álvaro de Luna
- Luis Escobar Kirkpatrick
- Concha Leza
- Ovidi Montllor
- María Luisa San José
