= Sharp-Shooting Twin Sisters =

1966 film by Rafael Romero Marchent

- Film poster
- Spanish: Dos pistolas gemelas
- Directed by: Rafael Romero Marchent
- Screenplay by: Giovanni Simonelli
- Story by: Manuel Sebares
- Produced by: Benito Perojo
- Starring: Pilar Bayona; Emilia Bayona; Sean Flynn; Jorge Rigaud
- Cinematography: Franco Vitrotti
- Edited by: Daniele Alabiso; Antonio Ramírez de Loaysa
- Music by: Gregorio García Segura
- Production companies: Luxor Films; Producciones Benito Perojo; Transmonde Film
- Distributed by: Filmayer; New Gold Entertainment; VCL Communications
- Release date: 6 August 1966 (Spain)
- Running time: 92 min
- Countries: Spain; Italy

Sharp-Shooting Twin Sisters, aka A Woman for Ringo or Two Guns for Two Twins or Vengeance Ranch or Twin Guns (Spanish: Dos pistolas gemelas and Italian: Una donna per Ringo) is a 1966 Spanish-Italian film directed by Rafael Romero Marchent and starring Pili and Mili and Sean Flynn.

== Plot ==
Twin sisters, Jenny and Sally travel the American Old West with their grandfather and his medicine show (in the Italian version, the girls are traveling with their uncle). They sing and dance and show off their horse riding and sharp-shooting skills. Their grandfather has a bit of a gambling problem. It causes his demise when he is accidentally and fatally shot during a poker game, but he was left holding the winning hand. Thus the twins inherit the ranch their grandfather had won. Some bad hombres want to take the ranch away from the girls. Jimmy (In the Italian dubbed version Jimmy is known as Ringo) and Robert are two good guys who come to the aid of the twins.

== Cast ==
- Pilar Bayona as Jenny Parker
- Emilia Bayona as Sally Parker
- Sean Flynn as Jimmy Slattery/Ringo
- Jorge Rigaud as Trevor Slattery
- Beni Deus as Monahan
- Rogelio Madrid as Robert Clark
- Renato Baldini as Farrell
- Eva Guerr as Maggie
- Luis Induni as a Sheriff
- José Sepúlveda
- Giacomo Furia
- José Orjas as the grandpa/uncle
- Ricardo Rodríguez as a bandit
- Mario Morales as Ayudante del ferrocarril
- Guillermo Méndez as a bandit
- Gonzalo Esquiroz as a bandit
- José Uria
- Juan Maján
- Rossella Bergamonti
- María Bárbara
- Dolores Guerrero
- William Conroy as a Cowboy
- Álvaro Marenco as a Cowboy

== Production ==
Filming was shot on location in Tabernas, Almeria, Andalucia, Spain using the same sets used by the Clint Eastwood film "For a Few Dollars More". The film was a Spanish/Italian co-production. In the Spanish language dubbed version released under the title of "Dos Pistolas Gemelas", Sean's character is known as Jimmy Slattery and the twins were traveling with their grandfather. In the Italian language prints released under the title, "Una Donna per Ringo", Sean's character is known as Ringo and the twins travel with their uncle. The twins Pili y Mili are listed as Milly and Philys in the Italian language prints. The Italian language prints also have an opening prologue not included in the Spanish language prints, featuring the roughing up and murder of a man.
