= Scandal in the Family (1967 film) =

1967 film by Julio Porter

- Directed by: Julio Porter
- Written by: Julio Porter; Norberto Aroldi
- Starring: Pilar Bayona, Emilia Bayona, Niní Marshall, Ángel Garasa
- Cinematography: Américo Hoss
- Edited by: Jorge Gárate; Higinio Vecchione
- Release date: 13 April 1967
- Running time: 90 minutes
- Country: Argentina
- Language: Spanish

Scandal in the Family (Spanish: Escándalo en la familia) is a 1967 Argentine comedy film directed by Julio Porter and starring Pili and Mili, Niní Marshall and Ángel Garasa. It was entered into the 5th Moscow International Film Festival.

== Cast ==
- Niní Marshall as Loli
- Pilar Bayona as Pili Luna (as Pili)
- Emilia Bayona as Mili Terán (as Mili)
- Ángel Garasa as Dr. Raimundo Luna
- Yaco Monti as Marcelo
- Juan Carlos Altavista as Carlos
- Vicente Rubino as TV Director
- Héctor Calcaño
- Carlos Scazziotta as Fito
- Lalo Malcolm
- Fidel Pintos as Próspero
