= El hombre de los hongos =

- Directed by: Roberto Gavaldon
- Written by: Sergio Galindo; Roberto Gavaldón; Tito Davison
- Starring: Adolfo Marsillach; Isela Vega; Philip Michael Thomas; Sandra Mozarowsky
- Cinematography: Miguel Araña; Raul Perez Cubero
- Music by: Raul Lavista
- Distributed by: CONACINE
- Release date: 2 September 1976
- Running time: 110 minutes
- Country: Mexico
- Language: Spanish

El hombre de los hongos (English: The Man of the Mushrooms) is a 1976 Mexican drama film based on the novel of the same name by Sergio Galindo.

== Synopsis ==
The story unfolds in a family of rich landowners from the colonial era, which owns a sugar plantation on the edge of the jungle. While hunting in the forest one day, the father, Don Everardo, discovers a young black orphan by the river. He brings the child to his mansion and names him Gaspar. Friendly and intelligent, the boy quickly becomes a new member of the family. He plays with his son, Sebastian, and his two daughters, Emma and Lucilla, as if they were his own siblings. The family occasionally have lavish receptions, with fine dining. One of Don Everardo's favorite mushroom dishes is prepared with an old family recipe from Spain. The family discovers if the mushrooms are edible by making a servant eat a few first. If the servant collapses and dies, then the family does not serve mushrooms to the party.

The family has another flirtation with danger: They keep a black panther called Toy chained in the main courtyard. From time to time it is released and chases people.

Some years pass, and Gaspar grows into a handsome young man, and Lucila and Emma become beautiful women. They go into the woods hiking and swimming in the river. But the play of children has become flirtations, especially among young Gaspar and Emma. Along the way, Gaspar reveals his knowledge of different species of mushrooms that grow in the forest. There is also an incestuous relationship between Sebastian and Lucila, who want to leave the hacienda and go to the capital city where they can meet people of their own age.

The family unit falls apart when Emma and Elvira compete for the attentions of Gaspar. Elvira's flirtations with Gaspar provoke the jealousy of her husband and daughter Emma. One night someone mysteriously releases the panther and it attacks Elvira after her failed attempt to seduce Gaspar.

When Lucila takes the place of her mother, she informs Don Everardo about the affair of his daughter Emma with the black servant Gaspar. He decides to make him his new "man of the mushrooms". But no one has the knowledge of Gaspar on mushrooms, and a lavish party at the farm will become a circus when Emma and Gaspar take advantage of the mushrooms to get rid of the rest of their own family and escape together. But once in the forest, Gaspar suddenly disappears...

== Cast ==
- Adolfo Marsillach...Don Everardo
- Isela Vega... Elvira
- Philip Michael Thomas...Gaspar
- Sandra Mozarowsky...Emma
- Ofelia Medina...Lucila
- Fernando Allende...Sebastian
- Josefina Echánove...The Nanny
