= My Camp Rock =

Reality television franchise

My Camp Rock is a singing competition based on the Disney Channel Original Movie Camp Rock and its sequel, Camp Rock 2: The Final Jam. Two series have been broadcast in the United Kingdom, and two editions in 2009 and 2010 in Sweden, Denmark, and Norway as My Camp Rock Scandinavia. 2010 saw the launching of the Benelux version of the show in Belgium, Netherlands, and Luxembourg.

== British version ==
My Camp Rock
- Presented by: Jason King (2009); Joel Ross (2009); Sarah-Jane Crawford (2010); Nigel Clarke (2010)
- Starring: Series 1: Zoe Tyler; Gary Lloyd; Series 2 Mentors: John Modi; Beth Honan
- Country of origin: United Kingdom
- Original language: English
- No. of seasons: 2
- No. of episodes: 10

Production
- Running time: 25 minutes
- Production company: Unique Television

Original release
- Network: Disney Channel
- Release: 3 April 2009 – 10 September 2010

Related
- My School Musical

=== 2009: My Camp Rock ===
My Camp Rock, the first season, aired on Disney Channel UK from April 3 to 25, 2009. The first promo aired to promote the show aired one month earlier. It was a singing competition that invited UK viewers to log online and make a video of themselves singing "This Is Me", and "We Rock" as a group, a duet or a solo, with entries posted from 19 December 2008, until the closing date, 11 February 2009.

The competition was open to girls and boys aged 8 to 16. The best 8 entries were picked to participate in the TV show, and to attend a 4-day intensive Camp Rock-style singing and dancing workshop. The four judges whittled the 8 acts down to 4 to compete in the Final Jam, which was held at the Riverside Studios on April 24, where a viewer vote decided the winner. The eight finalists had the opportunity to demonstrate their musical talent to the panel of judges through a range of music based activities and also some physical activities. Guidance was provided to help the finalists prepare for the final audition. The finalists were filmed throughout the Boot Camp and the press were also at Boot Camp to interview the Boot Camp Finalists and publicise the competition.

The winner was Holly-Anne Hull, 14 from Camberley, Surrey. The prize was for her to have a professional recording, release and music video of her version of "This is Me", a song from the series.

==== Finalists ====
- Jessica Hammond – 15 from Belfast
- Holly-Anne Hull – 14 from Camberley, Surrey
- DJ Ajayi – 14 from Solihull
- Reece Cook – 11 from Lowestoft, Suffolk
- Abby Timms and Lucy Jennings – 16/15 from Birmingham
- Alex Doyle, Jasmin Huysmans and Briony Morgan – 13/14/15 from Dublin
- Lillian Chan and Saachi Sen – Both 13 from Hampstead, London
- Georgina Blyth – 12 from Lutterworth, Leicestershire

==== Episodes ====
- Episode 1 - Friday 3 April 2009 at 5:35 pm
- Episode 2 - Friday 10 April 2009 at 5:35 pm
- Camp Jam - Friday 17 April 2009 at 5:35 pm
- Final Jam - Friday 24 April 2009 at 5:35 pm
- The Results Show - Saturday 25 April 2009 at 10:30 am
- The Winner's Music Video - Friday 1 May 2009 at 5:55 pm

Episode 1

The show premiered on 3 April on Disney Channel UK at 5:35 pm and was hosted by Jason King and Joel Ross. First the Camp Rockers each sang on their own in front of Zoe, Gary, JK and Joel. They then had a vocal and dance lesson. In the end the adults threw a welcome party for the Camp Rockers.

The songs Zoe Tyler chose for the contestants:

- Jessica Hammond - "Here I Am"
- Holly-Anne Hull - "Here I Am"
- DJ Ajayi - "Who Will I Be"
- Reece Cook - "Play My Music"
- Abby Timms and Lucy Jennings - "2 Stars"
- Alex Doyle, Jasmin Huysmans and Briony Morgan - "We Rock"
- Lillian Chan and Saachi Sen - "This Is Me"
- Georgina Blyth - "This Is Me"

Episode 2

A new episode was shown on 10 April, again at 5:35 pm. It showed the contestants training for the Camp Jam, and some others being told what their song is, in addition that Camp Jam would be held on 17 April, and that there would be four judges. The contestants' friends and family were there, and the best four contestants would go through to the Final Show, on April 25, where a viewer vote would decide the winner of My Camp Rock.

Camp Jam

The Camp Jam was on 17 April, again at 5:35 pm. It started with the contestants practicing/preparing for the Camp Jam. First the contestants performed, and the judges decided which four finalists they should put through to the final. The four judges were Zoe Tyler, Craig David, Martin Morales, and Gary Lloyd.

The 4 Final Acts were:

- Reece Cook
- Abby Timms and Lucy Jennings
- Holly-Anne Hull
- Jessica Hammond

Final Jam

The Final Jam was broadcast live on 24 April, again at 5:35 pm, at the Riverside Studios in Hammersmith, London, where the four finalists battled it out to become the winner of My Camp Rock. There was a viewer vote from 6 pm to 6:20 pm, Disney Channel UK for viewers to log onto www.disneychannel.co.uk and vote for who they want to win the show.

The Results Show

The Results Show was on 25 April at 10:30 am. The Saturdays performed their song "Up" and Demi Lovato performed her song "La La Land" and also presented the trophy to the winner. The winner was 14-year-old Holly-Anne Hull.

=== 2010: My Camp Rock 2 ===
My Camp Rock 2 premiered on 13 August 2010 at 5.35 pm. The series was presented by Sarah-Jane Crawford and Nigel Clarke. The trainers, John Modi and Beth Honan set the finalists tasks to do each week, which were chosen to help the finalists develop their performance skills. The tasks are detailed in the episode summaries below. The final episode of the series aired on 10 September. In this episode the public voted for Shannon Saunders to win My Camp Rock 2 and have her version of a song from the series professionally recorded and released along with a music video.

==== Finalists ====
There were 4 finalists:

- Leanne Fotheringham
- Parisa Tarjomani
- Shannon Saunders
- Ryan Hulme

==== Episodes ====
Episode 1

In this episode, the 4 finalists were introduced and set a task by John Modie to go busking in Covent Garden. Beth Honan surprised the finalists during dance training when she arranged for dance group Flawless to come to the studio and help the finalists learn the dance routine to the Camp Rock 2 song "Fire".

Episode 2

In this episode, the finalists were given their songs that they would have to perform in the final, which John Modi picked to suit their individual styles. Leanne was given "Can't Back Down", Parisa was given "It's Not Too Late", Shannon Saunders was given "Introducing Me", and Ryan was given "Heart and Soul". They were also given parts of the Camp Rock 2 song "It's On" to perform as a group. Beth Honan helped the finalists to develop their dance skills by getting them to perform their parts of "It's On" with each other. John Modi also gave the finalists a task of performing their songs at the International Youth Arts Festival in Kingston. The finalists were given individual coaching beforehand by pop star Simon Webbe, who went to the Youth Arts Festival with the finalists to give them support.

Episode 3

In this episode, Beth Honan gave the finalists individual tuition to give them more confidence to be able to perform their individual songs in front of the cameras. John Modi set the finalists their first individual tasks: Leanne was set the task of climbing a climbing wall to help her to overcome a fear of heights and give her more confidence, while Shannon was set the task of working on a fruit and vegetables stall in a market to giver her confidence of performing in front of a crowd and stop her being shy. Parisa was set the task of trying to sell perfume and aftershave to the public in a city centre street to help to build her confidence and be able to connect with the audience better and Ryan was sent to visit a martial arts sensei to help him to build his confidence. The finalists were also shown being told about their next task, which was to perform individual "gigs" in their home town in front of their friends and families.

Episode 4

In this episode, the finalists performed individual gigs in their home towns in front of their friends and families. The finalists were also shown arriving at the venue for the My Camp Rock 2 final, Koko.

Episode 5

This double length episode, which aired on Friday, 10 September, was the final episode of My Camp Rock 2 where the finalists performed their final songs of the competition. The public voted the winner of the competition to be 16 year old Shannon Saunders who performed the song "Introducing Me". The singer from Wiltshire, England is a self-taught guitarist and pianist. Her prize was to have her version of a song from the series professionally recorded and released together with a music video. This was followed by recording the song "I See the Light" for the British version of the Disney film Tangled.

== Scandinavian version ==
=== 2009: My Camp Rock Scandinavia ===
A joint Scandinavian series of the format was broadcast in Sweden, Denmark and Norway via the Disney Channel Scandinavia in 2009 and presented by Lebanese-Swedish singer and presenter Eric Saade. The series was won by Swedish Shenie Fogo who performed the song "Here I Am".

=== 2010: My Camp Rock 2 Scandinavia ===
A follow-up series was broadcast in 2010. The winner in the second and final season was the 13-year-old Swedish candidate Vendela Hollström singing "Its Not Too Late". Another song "Fire" by Swedish Ola Svensson, Danish Mohamed Ali and Norwegian Endre Nordvik became well known after it was adopted as the theme song for My Camp Rock 2.

== Benelux version ==
=== 2010: My Rock Camp Benelux ===
My Rock Camp was also broadcast jointly for Benelux countries Belgium, the Netherlands and Luxembourg in 2010. The winners were Cheyenne & Mayleen.

== Spanish version ==
=== 2009: My Camp Rock Spain ===
Winner: Lucía Gil (10, Madrid)

=== 2010: My Camp Rock 2 Spain ===
Winner: Ana Mena (14, Málaga)

== French version ==
=== 2009: My Camp Rock France ===
Winners: Cynthia (15, Arles) & Félix (16, Meaux)

They sang the French version of "We Rock".

=== 2010: My Camp Rock 2 France ===
Winners: Nicolas (15, Pau) & Noémie (16, Paris)

They sang the French version of "It's On".
