= School of Death =

- Theatrical poster
- Spanish: El colegio de la muerte
- Directed by: Pedro L. Ramírez
- Screenplay by: Pedro L. Ramírez; Ricardo Vázquez
- Story by: Sandro Continenza; Alfonso Balcázar; Manuel Sebares
- Starring: Dean Selmier; Sandra Mozarowsky; Norma Kastel
- Cinematography: Antonio L. Ballesteros
- Edited by: María Luisa Soriano
- Production company: Maxper Producciones Cinematográficas
- Distributed by: Filmax
- Release date: 1975
- Running time: 90 minutes
- Country: Spain
- Language: Spanish

School of Death (Spanish: El colegio de la muerte) is a 1975 Spanish horror film directed by Pedro L. Ramírez and starring Dean Selmier and Sandra Mozarowsky.

== Plot ==
The film is set in a girls' boarding school in 1899 London. The students are forced to undergo brain surgery to eliminate their memories, before being forced into prostitution for wealthy aristocrats.

== Cast ==
- Dean Selmier as Dr. Edward Brown
- Sandra Mozarowsky as Leonore Johnson
- Norma Kastel as Miss Wilkins
- Carlos Mendy as George Allen
- Victoria Vera as Sylvia Smith
- Estanis González as Collins
- Ángel Menéndez as Inspector Coldman
- Tito García as Grandfield
- Cris Huerta as Lord Ferguson
- Elisenda Ribas as Pamela

== Release ==
=== Home media ===
Mondo Macabro released the film for the first time on Blu-ray in 2021.
