= Whisky and Vodka =

Whisky y vodka
- Poster
- Directed by: Fernando Palacios
- Written by: Jaime de Armiñán, Mariano Ozores, Manuel Iglesias, Arturo Rigel, Paul Geganf
- Starring: Pilar Bayona, Emilia Bayona, Rafael Alonso, Roberto Camardiel, Roger Dann, Pierre Doris
- Cinematography: Francisco Fraile
- Release date: 1965
- Running time: 100 minutes
- Country: Spain
- Language: Spanish

Whisky y vodka (lit. 'Whisky and vodka') is a 1965 Spanish musical comedy film directed by Fernando Palacios and starring Pili and Mili.

== Plot ==
It is a comedy of twin-switching. Pili and Mili play the daughters of the ambassadors of, respectively, the USSR and the United States. They meet in Chamonix, France.

José Manuel Recio reviewed the film in his 1992 book Biografía y películas de Alfredo Landa, writing: "The film is as similar to the rest of Pili and Mili's film adventures as they are to each other. Here, one is American and the other is Russian, so you can imagine the story."

== Music ==
The music and songs for the soundtrack were provided by Waldo de los Ríos.

== Cast ==
- Pilar Bayona
- Emilia Bayona
- Rafael Alonso
- Roberto Camardiel
- Roger Dann
- Pierre Doris
