= Sandra Mozarowsky =

Spanish actress (1958–1977)

- Born: Alexandra Elena Mozarowski Ruiz de Frías; 17 October 1958; Tangier, Morocco
- Died: 14 September 1977 (aged 18); Madrid, Spain
- Other names: Sandra Mazarowski; Sandra Mozarosky; Sandra Mozarovski
- Occupation: Actress
- Years active: 1969–1977

Alexandra Elena Mozarowski Ruiz de Frías (17 October 1958 – 14 September 1977), also known by the stage name Sandra Mozarowsky, was a Spanish actress from 1969 until her death in 1977. She starred in films such as Night of the Seagulls and Beatriz.

== Early life and career ==
She was born Alexandra Elena Mozarowski Ruiz de Frías, in Tangier, Morocco, on 17 October 1958. She was the daughter of a Russian father and Spanish mother. In 1969, she made her film debut in Spain in El otro árbol de Guernica (The Other Tree of Guernica) when she was ten years old. Until her death in 1977, Sandra was one of the "Lolitas" of the coproduced Spanish Genre and "exploitation" cinema of the late 1970s. Sandra's film credits include La noche de las gaviotas - the fourth and final film in the Blind Dead series, El colegio de la muerte (School of Death), Cuando el cuerno suena (When the Horn Sounds), Beatriz, and Call Girl: La vida privada de una señorita (Call Girl: The Private Life of a Young Lady).

== Death ==
Mozarowsky fell off her fourth-floor balcony, spent twenty-two days in vegetative coma, and died of her injuries on 14 September 1977. Her death was officially ruled a suicide; some news reports stated she was watering flowers at the time of her fall, which took place around 4 AM.

Speculation on the cause of her death coalesced in a consistent version which has found its way into written media, some of it by well-established authors. For instance, in his book Ladies of Spain, Andrew Morton says:

- "Alleged royal lovers include Italian singer Raffaella Carrà and nubile actress Sandra Mozarowski, who died in mysterious circumstances. There were sinister suggestions about her apparent suicide—all that is known for a fact is that she was watering her plants when she fell off her apartment balcony—was orchestrated by [undisclosed] persons who feared she might put the Royal Household in a difficult position."

In his book Mario Conde, La reclusión del éxito, journalist Javier Bleda wrote the following (boldface not included in the original):

- "If these prison depositions [concerning a video allegedly kept by Narcís Serra to keep the King in check] by Julián Sancristóbal were true, which I for one do not doubt considering [Serra's] access to sensitive intel, the logical conclusion would be that, aside from the fact Bárbara Rey might have filmed herself [with the King] in order to ensure she was not suicided from a balcony (**Sandra, thou shalt not be forgotten**), there would have been additional interests directly linked to the System underlying other equally egregious motion pictures."

Another explanation of the events from an unofficial point of view is offered in Escrito en un libro, authored under pen name Tom Farrell—shared by Kevin Costner's character in No Way Out, ostensibly a nod to the circumstances surrounding the death of Sean Young's character in that film. According to this book the assault on an actress, called "Sara Wagnerowski" and pregnant with the King's child (Juan Carlos and his family do appear with their names intact), was orchestrated by one "Néstor Colomer, Barón de Andújar" (arguably a fictionalised version of the 23rd Marquess of Mondéjar, chief of the Royal Household at the time).

According to this version, "Andújar" arranged the ambush with the intent of causing the actress a miscarriage but the injuries sustained in her defenestration were too serious. The story draws heavily from what seems to be a first-hand account of a rookie Royal Household security staff member. This confidante allegedly stood near the woman's street level doorstep and witnessed her fall minutes after his immediate supervisor accompanied two other men (speculated to be Marseillais or South European thugs on a shady payroll) upstairs to her flat.

She was buried in the Holy Guardian Angel Cemetery in Madrid.

== Filmography ==
=== Film ===
Year	Title	Role	Notes
1969	El otro árbol de Guernica	Montserrat	other title - Another Tree of Guernica. credited as Sandra Mazarowski
1973	Los ojos azules de la muñeca rota (House of Psychotic Women)	Young tourist in bar	uncredited
1973	Lo verde empieza en los Pirineos	Chica francesa	other title - Smut Starts at the Pyrenees. credited as Sandra Mozarovski
1974	El mariscal del infierno (The Devil's Possessed)		other title - The Marshal of Hell
1975	La noche de las gaviotas (Night of the Seagulls)	Lucy	other title - Night of the Death Cult
1975	Sensualidad	Pilar	other title - Sensuality
1975	Las protegidas	Marisa	other title - The Protected
1975	El colegio de la muerte	Leonore Johnson	other title - The College of Death. credited as Sandra Mozarosky
1975	Cuando el cuerno suena	Julia	other title - When the Horn Sounds. credited as Sandra Mozarosky
1975	El clan de los Nazarenos		other title - The Clan of the Nazarenes
1976	El libro del buen amor II		other title - The Book of Love 2
1976	El hombre de los hongos	Emma	other title - Man of the Mushrooms
1976	Beatriz	Beatriz	
1976	Call Girl: La vida privada da una señorita bien	Laura	other title - Call Girl: The Private Life of a Lady Well
1977	Abortar en Londres		other title - Abortion in London
1977	Train spécial pour SS	Greta	other titles - Hitler's Last Train, Helltrain, Special Train for Hitler
1977	Hasta que el matrimonio nos separe	Martina	other title - Until Marriage do us part
1977	Pecado mortal	Doncella	other titles - Mortal Sin, Deadly Sin
1977	El espiritista		
1977	Ángel negro		other titles - Black Angel, Angel Black

=== Television ===
Year	Title	Role	Notes
1975	Cuentos y leyendas		1 episode - El estudiante de Salamanca
1976	Curro Jiménez		1 episode - El retorno al hogar

== See also ==
- List of unsolved deaths
