= The Pit and the Pendulum (1961 film) =

1961 film by Roger Corman

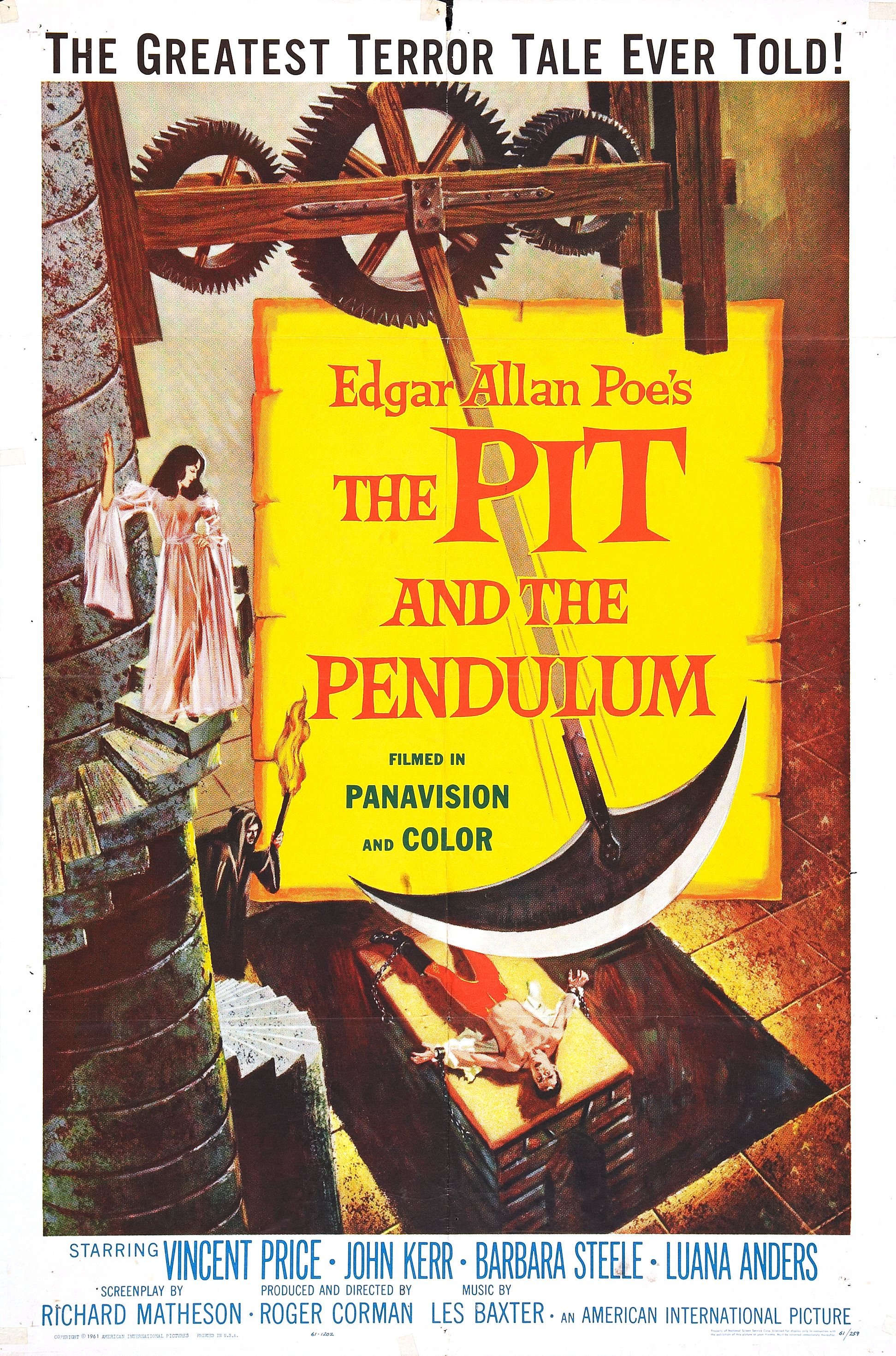
- Original 1961 theatrical release poster by Reynold Brown
- Directed by: Roger Corman
- Screenplay by: Richard Matheson
- Based on: "The Pit and the Pendulum" by Edgar Allan Poe
- Produced by: Roger Corman
- Starring: Vincent Price; John Kerr; Barbara Steele; Luana Anders
- Cinematography: Floyd Crosby
- Edited by: Anthony Carras
- Music by: Les Baxter
- Color process: Pathécolor
- Production company: Alta Vista Productions
- Distributed by: American International Pictures
- Release date: August 12, 1961
- Running time: 80 minutes
- Country: United States
- Language: English
- Budget: US$300,000
- Box office: US$2 million or $1.5 million 204,570 admissions (France)

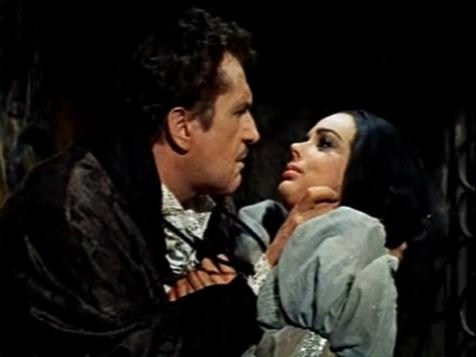
Vincent Price and Barbara Steele

The Pit and the Pendulum is a 1961 American horror film directed by Roger Corman, starring Vincent Price, Barbara Steele, John Kerr, and Luana Anders. The screenplay by Richard Matheson was loosely inspired by Edgar Allan Poe's 1842 short story of the same name. Set in sixteenth-century Spain, the story is about a young Englishman who visits a foreboding castle to investigate his sister's mysterious death. After a series of horrific revelations, apparently ghostly appearances and violent deaths, the young man becomes strapped to the titular torture device by his lunatic brother-in-law during the film's climactic sequence.

The film was the second title in the popular series of Poe adaptations released by American International Pictures, the first having been Corman's House of Usher released the previous year. Like House, the film features widescreen cinematography by Floyd Crosby, sets designed by art director Daniel Haller, and a film score composed by Les Baxter. A critical and box-office hit, Pit's success convinced AIP and Corman to continue adapting Poe stories for another six films, five of them starring Price. The series ended in 1964 with the release of The Tomb of Ligeia.

Film critic Tim Lucas and writer Ernesto Gastaldi have both noted the film's strong influence on numerous subsequent Italian thrillers, from Mario Bava's The Whip and the Body (1963) to Dario Argento's Deep Red (1975). Stephen King has described one of Pit's major shock sequences as being among the most important moments in post-1960 horror film.

== Plot ==
In 1547 Spain, Englishman Francis Barnard visits the castle of his brother-in-law, Nicholas Medina, to investigate the mysterious disappearance of his sister, Elizabeth. Nicholas and his younger sister, Catherine, offer a vague explanation that Elizabeth died from a rare blood disorder three months earlier; Nicholas is evasive when Francis asks for specific details. Francis vows not to leave until he discovers the truth behind his sister's death.

Francis again asks about his sister's death during dinner with the family physician, Dr. Leon. Dr. Leon tells him that his sister died of massive heart failure, literally "dying of fright". Francis demands to see where Elizabeth died. Nicholas takes him to the castle's torture chamber. Nicholas reveals that Elizabeth became obsessed with the chamber's torture devices under the influence of the castle's "heavy atmosphere". After becoming progressively unbalanced, she locked herself into an iron maiden, and died after whispering the name "Sebastian" one day. Francis refuses to believe Nicholas's story.

Francis tells Catherine that Nicholas appears to feel "definite guilt" regarding Elizabeth's death. In response, Catherine talks about Nicholas's traumatic childhood. Their father was Sebastian Medina, a notorious agent of the Spanish Inquisition. When Nicholas was a small child, he explored the forbidden torture chamber when his father entered the room with his mother, Isabella, and Sebastian's brother, Bartolome. Hiding in a corner, Nicholas watched in horror as his father repeatedly hit Bartolome with a red-hot poker, screaming "Adulterer!" at him. After murdering Bartolome, Sebastian began torturing his wife slowly to death in front of Nicholas.

Dr. Leon later informs Catherine and Francis that Isabella was not tortured to death; instead, she was entombed behind a brick wall while still alive. He explains, "The very thought of premature interment was enough to drive your brother into convulsions of horror." Nicholas fears that Elizabeth may have been interred prematurely. The doctor tells Nicholas that "if Elizabeth Medina walks the corridors of this castle, it is her spirit, not her living self."

Nicholas believes that his late wife's vengeful ghost is haunting the castle. Elizabeth's room is the source of a loud commotion, now ransacked and her portrait slashed. Her beloved harpsichord plays in the middle of the night. One of Elizabeth's rings shows up on the keyboard. Francis accuses Nicholas of planting the evidence of Elizabeth's "haunting" as an elaborate hoax. Nicholas insists that Francis open his wife's tomb. They discover Elizabeth's putrefied corpse frozen in a position that suggests she died screaming after failing to claw her way out of her sarcophagus. Nicholas faints. Dr Leon swears that he believed Elizabeth was dead when they interred her body. Later, Francis tells Catherine that he is sorry that he was right about Elizabeth's death, as he now realises that it was not Nicholas' fault.

That night, Nicholas – now on the verge of insanity – hears Elizabeth calling him. He follows her ghostly voice down to her tomb. Elizabeth rises from her coffin and pursues Nicholas into the torture chamber, where he falls down a flight of stairs. As Elizabeth gloats over her husband's unconscious body, her lover and accomplice, Dr. Leon, appears. They had plotted to drive Nicholas mad so that she could inherit his fortune and the castle.

Leon confirms that Nicholas "is gone", his mind destroyed by terror. Elizabeth taunts her insensate husband, but then Nicholas suddenly begins laughing hysterically while Elizabeth and Dr. Leon recoil in horror. Believing himself to be Sebastian, he replays the events of his mother and uncle's murders, mistaking Elizabeth for Isabella and Dr. Leon for Bartolome. Nicholas slams Dr. Leon against a pillar and seizes Elizabeth, repeating his father's promise to Isabella to torture her. After dealing with Elizabeth, Nicholas attacks a fleeing Dr. Leon, who falls to his death in the pit while trying to escape.

Francis, having heard Elizabeth's screams, enters the dungeon. Nicholas also confuses Francis for Bartolome and knocks him unconscious. He straps him to a stone slab located directly beneath a huge razor-sharp pendulum. The pendulum is attached to a clockwork apparatus that causes it to descend fractions of an inch after each swing, closer to Francis' torso. Catherine arrives just in time with Maximillian, one of the Medina family's servants. After a brief struggle with Maximillian, Nicholas falls to his death. Francis is removed from the torture device, bleeding but still alive.

The three survivors–Francis, Catherine, and Maximillian–leave the torture chamber, and Catherine vows that no one shall ever enter it again. Unbeknownst to them, a still-living Elizabeth, gagged and trapped in the iron maiden, watches helplessly as the door is closed and locked forever.

== Cast ==
- Vincent Price as Nicholas / Sebastian Medina
- John Kerr as Francis Barnard
- Barbara Steele as Elizabeth
- Luana Anders as Catherine Medina
- Antony Carbone as Doctor Leon
- Patrick Westwood as Maximillian
- Lynette Bernay as Maria
- Larry Turner as Nicholas as child
- Mary Menzies as Isabella
- Charles Victor as Bartolome

== Production ==
=== Development ===
20th Century Fox had announced plans to film the story in the late '50s, along with versions of "The Tell-Tale Heart" and "The Murders in the Rue Morgue", but the films were never made.

When Roger Corman's House of Usher was released in June 1960, its box office success took AIP's James H. Nicholson and Samuel Z. Arkoff by surprise. Corman admitted, "We anticipated that the movie would do well... but not half as well as it did." According to Richard Matheson, "When the first film was a hit, they still didn't consider doing a Poe series. They just wanted another movie with a Poe title fixed to it."

Corman felt Poe's two strongest stories after "Usher" were "The Masque of the Red Death", and '"Pit and the Pendulum". He considered making the former but was worried about similarities between the story and The Seventh Seal (1957), so he decided on adapting the latter. However Samuel Z. Arkoff said it was his and James H. Nicholson's decision to make Pit as the second Poe film "because it was a lot more graphic and in the second place, The Masque of the Red Death would have needed a dancing troupe that would have been quite expensive. In all those early Poe pictures we had relatively few actors, so when we did finally make Masque of the Red Death we went to the UK where it would be less expensive to do it."

=== Screenplay ===
Matheson's script freely devised an elaborate narrative that barely resembled Poe, with only the finale having any similarity at all to the original short story on which the film was based. Corman noted, "The method we adopted on The Pit and the Pendulum was to use the Poe short story as the climax for a third act to the motion picture... because a two-page short story is not about to give you a ninety-minute motion picture. We then constructed the first two acts in what we hoped was a manner faithful to Poe, as his climax would run only a short time on the screen."

Matheson's screenplay included a flashback to a time immediately preceding Elizabeth's illness, featuring Nicholas and Elizabeth horse riding and eating a picnic lunch. Corman deleted the sequence prior to filming because he felt it violated one of his major theories regarding the Poe series:

I had a lot of theories I was working with when I did the Poe films... One of my theories was that these stories were created out of the unconscious mind of Poe, and the unconscious mind never really sees reality, so until The Tomb of Ligeia, we never showed the real world. In Pit, John Kerr arrived in a carriage against an ocean background, which I felt was more representative of the unconscious. That horseback interlude was thrown out because I didn't want to have a scene with people out in broad daylight.

The screenplay was modified from its original draft form during the film's shooting. Price himself suggested numerous dialogue changes for his character. In the script, when Francis Barnard is first introduced to Nicholas, the young man asks about loud, strange noises he had heard a few moments earlier. Don Medina responds: "Uh... an apparatus, Mr. Barnard. (turning) What brings you to us?" Price penciled in the suggestions "that must be kept in constant repair" and "that cannot be stopped". Later in the screenplay, when Nicholas recalls his father's chamber of torture, Price devised alternate explanations for Sebastian Medina's violence. During Nicholas' death scene, after falling to the bottom of the pit the character originally had dialogue at the point of dying, asking in a voice of horror, "Elizabeth. What have I done to you? (beat) What have I done to you?" The camera was to then cut directly to Elizabeth's face trapped in the iron maiden. Corman decided to jettison the lines, believing that the film should remain purely visual at that point and dialogue would ruin the power of the scene.

=== Filming ===
The Pit and the Pendulum was announced in August 1960, and filming began 4 January 1961.

According to Lucy Chase Williams' book, The Complete Films of Vincent Price, the shooting schedule was fifteen days, and the film's budget was almost $1 million. Corman himself has said that the film's actual production cost was approximately $300,000.

Corman has noted that making the film was a pleasurable experience: "I enjoyed The Pit and the Pendulum because I actually got the chance to experiment a bit with the movement of the camera. There was a lot of moving camera work and interesting cutting in the climax of the film."

Filming went smoothly, and Corman attributed the ease of the production's shoot to the short but comprehensive pre-production planning he did with the major technicians:

We achieved what we did on a low budget because we carefully planned the whole production in advance of starting the cameras. Thus, when we moved into the studio for fifteen days of scheduled shooting, we didn't have to start making decisions. Because of our pre-production conferences with director of photography Floyd Crosby and art director Daniel Haller, everyone knew exactly what to do, barring any last minute inspirations on the set.

Barbara Steele as Elizabeth Medina, in one of the film's tinted, nightmarish flashback sequences

To create the flashbacks revealing Nicholas' traumatic experiences, Corman and Crosby attempted to shoot them in a manner that would convey to the audience the character's horror in dredging up nightmares trapped in his subconscious. Corman insisted on these images having a dream-like quality, "twisted and distorted because they were being experienced by someone on the rim of madness." Corman decided to film the flashbacks in monochrome, since he had read that some psychiatrists believe most people dream in "black-and white" imagery. Crosby used wide-angle lenses, violent camera movement, and tilted camera angles to represent the character's feeling of hysteria. The sequences were then printed on blue-tinted stock which was subsequently toned red during development, effectively producing a two-tone image. The highlights were blue, with the shadows rendered as red...producing a deep, bloody quality. The image was then run through an optical printer where the edges were vignetted and a twisted linear distortion was introduced.

Prior to the start of filming, Corman had set aside one day of rehearsals with his cast. "Previously, I had painstakingly rehearsed the actors so there was complete understanding as to what each was to accomplish in each scene. This is most important; there is nothing worse than to be on the set and ready to roll, only to find that director and actor have different views as to how the scene is to be done. Thanks to pre-production planning and rehearsals, there was no time wasted on the set in haggling and making decisions."

=== Art direction ===
The film's brief exterior prologue showing Kerr's arrival to the castle was filmed on the Palos Verdes coast. The rest of the production was shot in four interior sound stages at the California Studios in Hollywood. To provide great freedom for the planned camera movements, a castle set with many levels and ample space was designed by Daniel Haller.

Because of the film's low budget, none of the sets could be constructed "from scratch." After Haller made sketches and floor plans for the sets, he searched the backlots and property lofts of the major studios in search of available set units that could be inexpensively rented and then put together to form the sets he had conceived. At Universal Studios, he located numerous discarded pieces from old productions, including massive archways, fireplaces, windows and doorways, and several torture machine props. At other studios, he found gigantic stairways and stone wall units. Haller selected and rented numerous pieces from these various depositories and had them delivered to California Studios, where the sets for the film were constructed, following his floor plans as closely as possible. To further set the atmosphere, about 20 gallons of cobwebbing was sprayed throughout the castle's sets.

The film's pressbook noted that the pendulum was eighteen-feet long and weighed over a ton and was constructed with a realistic rubber cutting blade. The pendulum was rigged from the top of the sound stage thirty-five feet in the air. In an interview, Haller provided details regarding the creation of the pendulum:

I found that such a pendulum actually was used during the Spanish and German inquisitions. At first we tried to use a rubberized blade, and that's why it got stuck on Kerr's chest. We then switched to a sharp metalized blade covered with steel paint. The problem was to get it in exactly the right position so it would slash John's shirt without actually cutting him. To guard against this, we put a steel band around his waist where the pendulum crosses. He was a good sport about it...but noticed him perspiring a good bit and no wonder. That pendulum was carving out a 50 foot arc just above his body.

To visually enhance the size of this set, the camera was equipped with a 40 mm Panavision wide-angle lens and mounted at the opposite end of the stage, giving Crosby the ability to frame the scenes in his camera with extra space at the bottom and at either side. These areas were filled in later by printing-in process extensions of the set, doubling its size onscreen.

== Response ==
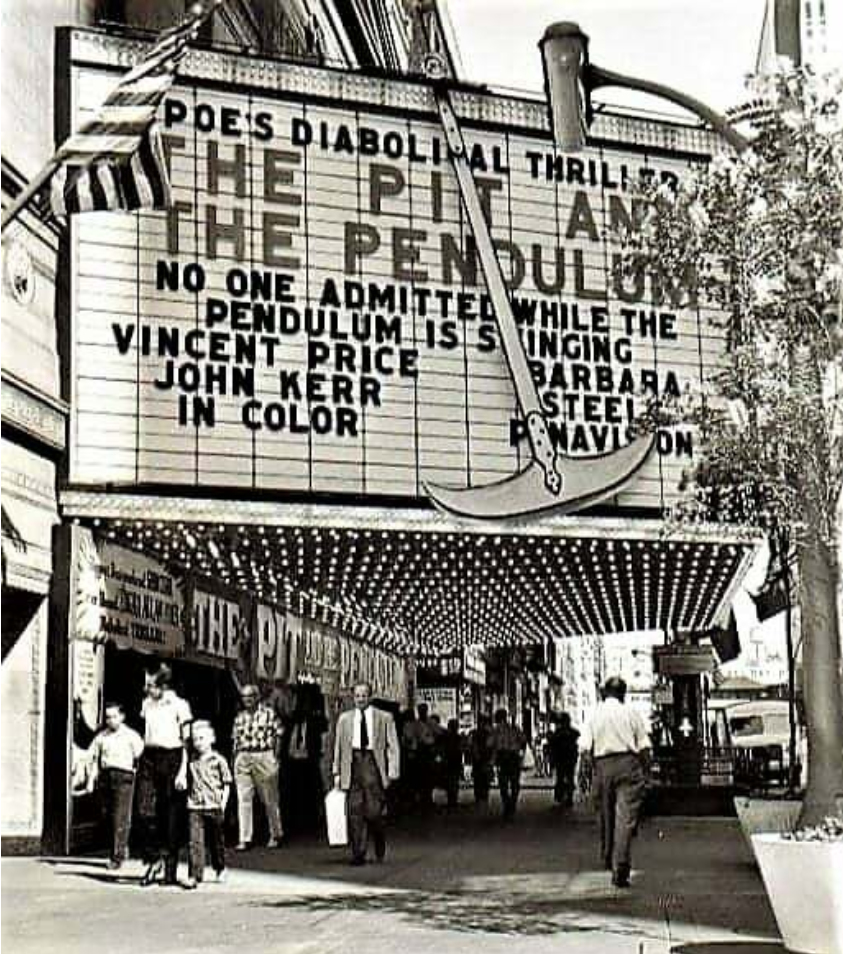
A cinema marquee advertising The Pit and the Pendulum in Chicago, Illinois, in 1961

=== Box office ===
The Pit and the Pendulum was a bigger financial hit than House of Usher, accruing over US$2,000,000 in distributors' domestic (U.S. and Canada) rentals versus the first film's US$1,450,000. This made it the most successful film to date in AIP's history.

The movie would remain the most financially successful of all the AIP Poe films. "It's also the one I liked the best because it was the scariest", said Arkoff. "We had a wonderful piece of artwork for the poster... as well as some great sets by Danny Haller."

=== Critical ===
According to writer Ed Naha, the film also received a better critical response than Usher. The majority of the film's reviews were positive.

Howard Thompson of The New York Times wrote, "Atmospherically at least—there is a striking fusion of rich colors, plush décor and eerie music—this is probably Hollywood's most effective Poe-style horror flavoring to date…Richard Matheson's ironic plot is compact and as logical as the choice of the small cast…Roger Corman has evoked a genuinely chilling mood of horror." Variety noted, "The last portion of the film builds with genuine excitement to a reverse-twist ending that might have pleased Poe himself...a physically stylish, imaginatively photographed horror film…" The Los Angeles Examiner said it was "…one of the best "scare" movies to come along in a long time...skillfully directed by Corman...with Vincent Price turning in the acting job of his career...." Brendan Gill of The New Yorker felt it was "a thoroughly creepy sequence of horrors..." Time called the film "a literary hair-raiser that is cleverly, if self-consciously, Edgar Allan poetic." The Hollywood Reporter described it as "... a class suspense/horror film of the calibre of the excellent ones done by Hammer...It is carefully made and has full production values...Vincent Price gives a characteristically rococo performance..."

The Monthly Film Bulletin was negative, writing that the production values "cannot prevent a strong impression of déjà vu", and that Kerr, Anders and Carbone were all "glumly wooden" in their performances. Charles Stinson of the Los Angeles Times was notably unimpressed by the film: "The uncredited [sic] scenario violates Poe's gothic style with passages of flat, modernized dialogue…But the pecadilloes of the script pale beside the acting…Price mugs, rolls his eyes continuously, and delivers his lines in such an unctuous tone that he comes near to burlesquing the role. His mad scenes are just ludicrous. The audience almost died laughing." Price was so infuriated by Stinson's negative review that he wrote a letter to the critic, saying, "I find I must break a 25-year determination never to answer a critic. Since your review of The Pit and the Pendulum was obviously not meant to be instructive, and therefore constructive, but only to hurt and humiliate, I'm sure you would enjoy the satisfaction of knowing that it did. My only consolation…is that it is the second-greatest box-office attraction in the country." Price apparently never sent the letter, placing it instead into his "Letting Off Steam File".

The film's critical reputation has continued to grow over the years, and it is now generally held to be one of the best entries in Corman's Poe series. Time Out has opined, "Corman at his intoxicating best, drawing a seductive mesh of sexual motifs from Poe's story through a fine Richard Matheson script." In The Penguin Encyclopedia of Horror and the Supernatural, Timothy Sullivan wrote: "The Pit and the Pendulum is even better than its predecessor…The plot is heady stuff, and Roger Corman drives it forward—with wonderful matte shots of the castle perched on the seaside cliff, odd camera angles, the thickest cobwebs in horror-movie history, a spider in the face, and an iron maiden—all before our hero is strapped under the pendulum...in a sequence that still stands one's hair on end." Phil Hardy's The Aurum Film Encyclopedia: Horror observed: "If Price's performance is noticeably more extravagant than in the earlier film, this is offset (or matched) by the markedly greater fluidity of camera movement. House of Usher seemed unsure of how to cope with the rush of action as Madeline returned from the grave; The Pit and the Pendulum has no such hesitations. From the great sequence in which Steele lures Price down into the crypt to the finale…its action is terrific." Tim Lucas, in reviewing the film's DVD release in 2001, wrote, "Benefitting from the box-office success of House of Usher, Pit is a more elaborate production and features some of the definitive moments of the AIP Corman/Poe series." Glenn Erickson, reviewing the DVD on his DVD Savant website, noted, "Roger Corman's second Edgar Allan Poe adaptation is a big improvement on his first, House of Usher… Remembered as a first-rate chiller by every kid who saw it, Pit and the Pendulum upped the ante for frantic action and potential grue…"

On review aggregator website Rotten Tomatoes, the film received an approval rating of 89% based on 28 retrospective reviews with the critical consensus reading "A chilling visual treat, The Pit and the Pendulum unites genre masters Roger Corman and Vincent Price with delightfully dark results".

The film was selected for screening as part of the Cannes Classics section at the 2016 Cannes Film Festival.

== Influence ==
The critical and popular success of The Pit and the Pendulum persuaded AIP's Arkoff and Nicholson to produce more Edgar Allan Poe-based horror films on a regular basis. The films that followed, all directed by Corman, were Premature Burial (1962), Tales of Terror (1962), The Raven (1963), The Haunted Palace (1963, actually based on the novella The Case of Charles Dexter Ward by H. P. Lovecraft), The Masque of the Red Death (1964), and The Tomb of Ligeia (1964).

Tim Lucas has argued that the film had a large impact on many Italian horror films that followed. Lucas noted, "It takes Corman's Freudian theories even further with a nightmarish flashback sequence that plants the seeds of Nicholas's breakdown, and would prove particularly influential on the future course of Italian horror — an influence that can be seen even in productions of the 1970s (Deep Red) and 1980s (A Blade in the Dark)." Writer K. Lindbergs has noted an "obvious influence" on Antonio Margheriti's Castle of Blood (1964) and its remake, Web of the Spider (1970).

Screenwriter Ernesto Gastaldi acknowledged that Ugo Guerra and Elio Scardamaglia, the producers of Mario Bava's The Whip and the Body (1963), had "shown me an Italian print of The Pit and the Pendulum before I started writing it: 'Give us something like this', they said." When asked if another of his films, The Long Hair of Death (1964), was inspired by Corman's film, Gastaldi replied, "Yes, of course! The Pit and the Pendulum had a big influence on Italian horror films. Everybody borrowed from it."

Stephen King felt that one of the film's most powerful shocks—the discovery of Elizabeth's hideously decayed corpse—had a major impact on the genre and served as one of the most significant horror sequences of the decade. In fact, shortly after seeing the film in eighth grade, a young King took inspiration from Monarch Books's film tie-ins and wrote an eight-page novelization of The Pit and the Pendulum, "blissfully unaware that [he] was in violation of every plagiarism and copyright statute in the history of the world", and managed to sell over thirty copies for 25¢ each at his school before one of his teachers forced him to return the profits. King later wrote, "Following the Hammer films, this becomes, I think, the most important moment in the post-1960 horror film, signaling a return to an all-out effort to terrify the audience... and a willingness to use any means at hand to do it."

== Padded television version ==
In 1968, when the film was sold to ABC-TV for television airings, the network noted that the film was too short to fill the desired two-hour time slot. They requested that AIP extend the film's runtime. Approximately five minutes of additional footage was subsequently shot by Corman's production assistant Tamara Asseyev.

Of the original cast members, only Luana Anders was available at the time, and the new sequence featured her character, Catherine Medina, confined to a lunatic asylum. After much screaming and hair pulling, Catherine reveals the details of her horrific story to her fellow inmates, at which point the film itself follows as a flashback.

== See also ==
- List of American films of 1961
- Gothic film – Notable films
- Phantom of Morrisville, a 1966 Czech comedy film.
