= Halina Zalewska =

Polish-born Italian actress

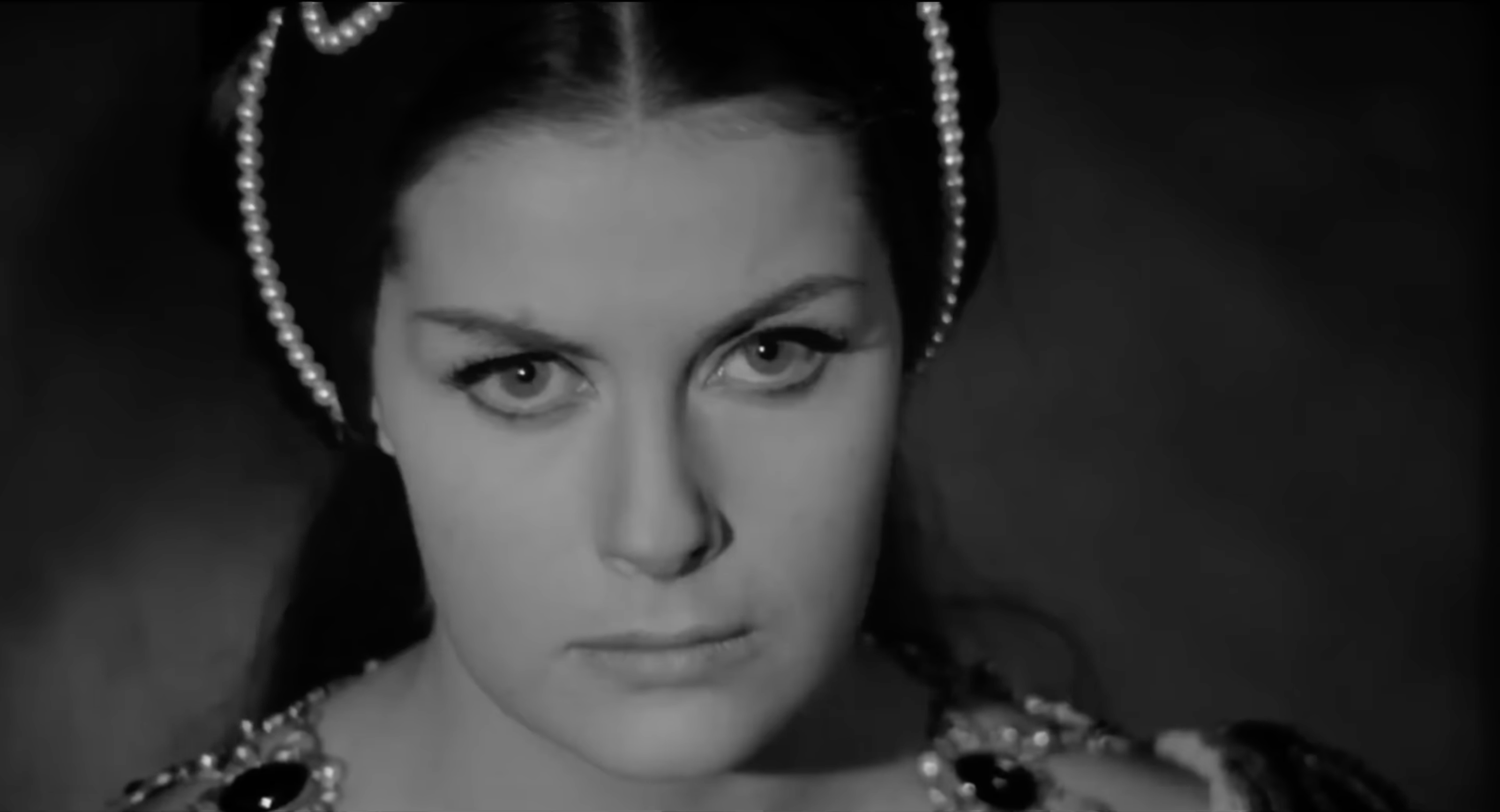
- Zalewska in The Long Hair of Death (1964)
- Born: 1940; Poland
- Died: 19 August 1976 (aged 36); Rome, Italy
- Occupation: Actress
- Relatives: Ely Galleani (half-sister)

Halina Zalewska (1940 – 19 August 1976) was a Polish-born Italian actress.

== Life and career ==
Born in Poland, Zalewska was the daughter of a Polish noblewoman and an Italian businessman. She spent her childhood in Alassio, her father's birthplace. Her career was launched by winning the beauty pageant Miss Muretto (held at the Muretto in Alassio) in 1958. She was very active in genre films, but her career include also a few art films, including a minor role in Luchino Visconti's The Leopard.

Zalewska accidentally died in a fire in 1976, aged 36 years old. She was the half-sister of actress Ely Galleani.

== Selected filmography ==
- Leoni al sole (1961) - Paola
- The Leopard (1963)
- Hercules, Samson and Ulysses (1963)
- The Warm Life (1964)
- Triumph of the Ten Gladiators (1964) - Myrta
- The Long Hair of Death (1964) - Lisabeth Karnstein
- Amore mio (1964)
- Hard Time for Princes (1965) - Luisetta
- Questo pazzo, pazzo mondo della canzone (1965)
- Giant of the Evil Island (1965) - Dona Alma Morales
- Seven Dollars on the Red (1966) - Mexican Woman (uncredited)
- An Angel for Satan (1966) - Luisa
- Agente segreto 777 - Invito ad uccidere (1966) - Frida
- War Between the Planets (1966) - Janet Norton
- The Ugly Ones (1966) - Eden
- La morte viene dal pianeta Aytin (1967) - Lt. Teri Sanchez
- Dynamite Joe (1967) - Betty
- Date for a Murder (1967) - Fidelia Forrester
- Gente d'onore (1967)
- Hate Is My God (1969) - Rosalie Field
- Nero Wolfe: Salsicce 'Mezzanotte' (1971, TV Series) - Dina Laszlo
- La polizia brancola nel buio (1975) - (final film role)
