= Margarete Robsahm =

Norwegian model, actress and director

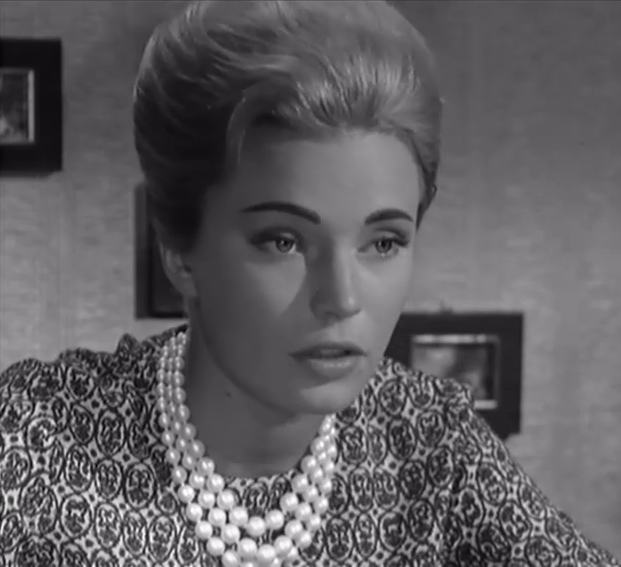
Margarete Robsahm in His Women (1961)

Margarete Robsahm (born 9 October 1942) is a Norwegian model, actress and director. She is the mother of director Thomas Robsahm and sister of the actor Fred Robsahm. To an international audience, she is best known for her role in Castle of Blood with Barbara Steele, but she has also starred in Norwegian movies, among these Line from 1961. The movie was based on a novel by Axel Jensen and caused a minor scandal in Norway at the time, as Robsahm was the first actress ever to expose her breasts in a Norwegian movie.

In March 2008, Robsahm drew media attention for having received NOK 2.3 million over sixteen years in government funding for the arts without having produced a single movie. Although no criticism was levelled at her personally, questions arose regarding the government stipendiary system.

== Filmography ==
=== Actress ===
- Fem døgn i august (1973)
- Oltraggio al pudore (All the Other Girls Do!) (1964)
- Danza macabra (Castle of Blood) (1964)
- The Young Racers (1963)
- Diciottenni al sole (Eighteen in the Sun) (1962)
- Il mantenuto (His Women) (1961)
- Line (The Passionate Demons) (1961)

=== Director and writer ===
- Begynnelsen på en historie (1988)
