= The Long Hair of Death =

- Italian theatrical release poster
- Directed by: Antonio Margheriti
- Written by: Tonino Valerii; Anthony Dawson
- Story by: Ernesto Gastaldi
- Produced by: Felice Testa Gay
- Starring: Barbara Steele; George Ardisson; Halina Zalewska
- Cinematography: Riccardo Pallottini
- Edited by: Mario Serandrei
- Music by: Carlo Rustichelli
- Production company: Cinegai S.p.A.
- Distributed by: U.N.I.D.I.S. (Italy)
- Release date: December 30, 1964 (Italy)
- Running time: 100 minutes
- Country: Italy
- Box office: ₤321 million

The Long Hair of Death (Italian: I lunghi capelli della morte) is a 1964 Italian horror film directed by Antonio Margheriti. It stars British actress Barbara Steele in the roles of Helen Rochefort and Mary, Italian actor George Ardisson as Kurt Humboldt, and Polish actress Halina Zalewska in a dual role as Adele Karnstein and her daughter Lisabeth. It is set in a 15th-century feudal castle, and the nearby village.

== Plot ==
In a 15th-century feudal village, Adele Karnstein is accused of witchcraft and burned at the stake. Her beautiful older daughter Helen knows the real reason for the execution is Count Franz Humboldt's sexual desire for her mother. After confronting the count, he kills Helen. Adele's younger daughter, Lisabeth, is taken to live in the Humboldt castle. When she grows up Lisabeth is forced to marry the count's worthless son, Kurt. A horrible and deadly plague sweeps the land. During a thunderstorm, a mysterious woman appears named Mary, strongly resembling Helen. In an atmosphere of cruelty, superstition, sexuality, and the plague's scourge, Mary begins to avenge Adele's death.

== Cast ==
- Barbara Steele as Helen Rochefort / Mary
- George Ardisson as Kurt Humboldt
- Halina Zalewska as Adele Karnstein / Lisabeth Karnstein
- Giuliano Raffaelli as Count Humboldt
- Laura Nucci as Grumalda
- Umberto Raho as Von Klage
- Nello Pazzafini as the Servant

== Production ==
The Long Hair of Death was written by Ernesto Gastaldi and Tonino Valerii. Gastaldi told Tim Lucas that Valerii had attempted to start his career as a director with the film, but that the producer had Antonio Margheriti chosen. Gastaldi also stated that the producer did not have Valerii direct as he had no experience at that time.

Most of the production was shot at Massimo Castle in Arsoli.

== Release ==
Produced by Felice Testa Gay's company Cinegai S.p.A., I lunghi capelli della morte was released in Italy on December 30, 1964, through the distributor U.N.I.D.I.S. It grossed a total of 321 million Italian lira on its theatrical release.

The film was released on DVD in the United States by East West Entertainment, as a double feature with Terror-Creatures from the Grave, and through the Midnight Choir label as a double feature with An Angel for Satan. In 2014, it was released on Blu-ray in the United States by Raro Video.

== Reception ==
In a contemporary review, the Monthly Film Bulletin found the film was "erratically scripted, unusually clumsily dubbed, and sagging badly in the middle" it still had "enough good sequences to lift it well out of the rut" and was "a pleasingly atmospheric Gothic tale". The review compared Margheriti to Mario Bava, stating that he "hasn't quite the same gift as Bava for this sort of thing" but still "acquits himself creditably". The review also praised the acting of Halina Zalewska and Barbara Steele finding the latter to be "her usual extraordinary self".

In retrospective reviews, the film was called a "superior monochrome gothic". Roberto Curti, author of Italian Gothic Horror Films felt the film was not as strong as Margheriti's Danza macabara (Castle of Blood). Margheriti himself stated that he did not like the film, because he felt the script and story were of poor quality.Video Librarian referred to the film as a "minor classic of Gothic horror" noting that it was "short on traditional horror set pieces (and plot)" but "boasts plenty of lovely imagery and ominous atmosphere."
