= Begynnelsen på en historie =

- Directed by: Margarete Robsahm
- Written by: Margarete Robsahm
- Starring: Linda Pedersen; Wenche Foss; Linn Stokke
- Release date: 1988
- Running time: 87 minutes
- Country: Norway
- Language: Norwegian

Begynnelsen på en historie (English: The beginning of a story) is a 1988 Norwegian drama film directed by Margarete Robsahm, starring Linda Pedersen, Wenche Foss and Linn Stokke.

It is summer in the late 1940s, and seven-year-old Maren (Pedersen) lives with her mother and two brothers on an island. Her father is in prison for treason during World War II. When summer is over, Maren has to move into boarding school in a big city, a fact that hangs like a cloud over the joy of summer for her.
