= Questo pazzo, pazzo mondo della canzone =

1965 Italian musicarello film

- Directed by: Bruno Corbucci; Giovanni Grimaldi
- Written by: Bruno Corbucci; Giovanni Grimaldi
- Starring: Alberto Bonucci; Aroldo Tieri; Vittorio Congia; Umberto D'Orsi; Sandra Mondaini; Valeria Fabrizi; Margaret Lee; Halina Zalewska; I Pellerani
- Cinematography: Luciano Trasatti
- Distributed by: Variety Distribution
- Release date: 1965
- Running time: 103 minutes
- Country: Italy
- Language: Italian

Questo pazzo, pazzo mondo della canzone is a 1965 Italian musicarello film written and directed by Bruno Corbucci and Giovanni Grimaldi.

== Cast ==
- Sandra Mondaini
- Valeria Fabrizi
- Aroldo Tieri
- Alberto Bonucci
- Margaret Lee
- Vittorio Congia
- Dana Ghia
- Marina Morgan
- Umberto D'Orsi
- Halina Zalewska
- Carlo Pisacane
- Andrea Aureli
- Gianni Morandi as himself
- Dino as himself
- Edoardo Vianello as himself
- Lucio Dalla as himself
- Nico Fidenco as himself
- Gino Paoli as himself
- Remo Germani as himself
- Françoise Hardy as herself
- Jenny Luna as herself
- Petula Clark as herself
- Luigi Tenco as himself
- Little Tony as himself
- Ricky Gianco as himself
- Udo Jürgens as himself
- Los Marcellos Ferial: as themselves (Music Group)
- Pellerani as themselves (Music Group)
- Susanna Clemm as the female viking
