= Hard Time for Princes =

Hard Times for Princes
- Directed by: Ettore Scola
- Written by: Ruggero Maccari; Ettore Scola
- Produced by: Mario Cecchi Gori
- Starring: Joan Collins; Vittorio Gassman
- Cinematography: Sandro D'Eva
- Music by: Luis Bacalov
- Release date: 1965
- Country: Italy
- Language: Italian

La congiuntura, internationally released as Hard Times for Princes and One Million Dollars, is a 1965 Italian comedy film directed by Ettore Scola.

== Cast ==
- Vittorio Gassman as Giuliano
- Joan Collins as Jane
- Jacques Bergerac as Sandro
- Hilda Barry as Dana
- Pippo Starnazza as Francesco
- Dino Curcio as Salerno
- Aldo De Carellis as Eduardo
- Alfredo Marchetti
- Halina Zalewska as Luisetta (as Alina Zalewska)
- Ugo Fangareggi
- Maurice Rosemberg
- Paolo Bonacelli as Zenone
- Renato Montalbano as Dino
- Marino Masé as Angelo
- Adolfo Eibenstein as Enrico
