= The Prophet (1998 film) =

1998 American film

- Home video cover art
- Directed by: Fred Olen Ray (as "Ed Raymond")
- Screenplay by: Don McKennan
- Starring: Don Wilson
- Edited by: W. Peter Miller
- Music by: Timothy Winn
- Release date: 1998
- Running time: 83 minutes
- Country: United States
- Language: English

The Capitol Conspiracy, also known as The Prophet, is a 1998 American thriller directed by Fred Olen Ray starring Don Wilson and Barbara Steele. The film was distributed direct to video tape. The plot involving a CIA agent uncovering illegal mind-control experiments makes references to The Manchurian Candidate.

== Premise ==
A CIA operative is tasked with finding and apprehending five members of a terrorist organization, but they keep getting killed before he can bring them in.

== Cast ==
- Don Wilson as Jarrid Maddox (credited as Don 'The Dragon' Wilson)
- Barbara Steele as Agent Oakley
- Paul Michael Robinson as Hunter
- Alexander Keith as Vicki Taylor
- Arthur Roberts as Richard Maddox
- Rick Dean as Sagan
- Jenna Bodnar as Coby
- Sid Sham as Loggins
- Chick Vennera as Salvator
- Robert Quarry as Agent Betts
- Eric Lawson as Agent Johnson
- Richard Gabai as Vernon
- Mirron E. Willis as Kegs
- Sam Hiona as Ambassador
- Warren A. Stevens as Kepler (credited as Warren Stevens)
- Ric Drasin as Wrestler #1 (credited as Rick Drasin)
- Joe Rose as Wrestler #2
- Alex Grant as Stewardess
- Fred Olen Ray as Hunter's Man (credited as Sherman Scott)
- Scott L. Schwartz as Biker (credited as Scott Schwartz)

== Reception ==
A review in Video Business said, "The film contains nothing you haven't seen before; in fact, the torpid fight choreography, familiar Southern California locations, and hokey sound effects call to mind numerous '70s B flicks. But Ray knows what action-film renters crave, and he hasn't missed a trick."

According to a reviewer at Moria Reviews, "Fred Olen Ray’s action scenes... are competent, especially the fight scenes aboard and around the train" but "on the minus side, Prophet is severely lacking in the script department."
