= Dynamite Joe =

- Film poster
- Directed by: Antonio Margheriti
- Screenplay by: María Del Carmen Martínez
- Story by: María Del Carmen Martínez
- Starring: Rik Van Nutter; Halina Zalewska
- Cinematography: Manuel Merino
- Edited by: Otello Colangeli
- Music by: Carlo Savina
- Production companies: Seven Film; Hispamer Films
- Distributed by: Cineriz
- Release dates: 15 February 1967; 14 July 1969 (Spain)
- Countries: Italy; Spain

Dynamite Joe (Italian: Joe l'implacabile) is a 1967 western film directed by Antonio Margheriti. It story and screenplay was by María del Carmen Martínez Román, and scored by Carlo Savina.

The film is an Italian and Spanish co-production.

== Cast ==
- Rik Van Nutter as 'Dynamite Joe' Ford
- Halina Zalewska as Betty
- Merce Castro as Eva
- Renato Baldini as Jury Nelson
- Barta Barri as Cigno
- Aldo Cecconi as Frank
- Alfonso Rojas as Sheriff Stanton
- Santiago Rivero as Senator Senneth
- Dario De Grassi as Scott
- Ricardo Palacios as El Sol
- Claudio Scarchilli as Jack Foster
- Vicente Roca as Bank director
- Mario Pluchino
- Saturno Cerra as Professor, Piano Player
- Barbara Davy
- Giglio Gigli as Foster Brother
- Franco Gulà as Old, full-bearded man in bedroom
- Rufino Inglés as Soldier
- Juan Olaguivel as Full-Bearded Puncher in Saloon

== Production ==
Dynamite Joe was an Italian and Spanish co-production between the Rome-based Seven Film and the Madrid-based Hispamer Film.

== Release ==
Dynamite Joe was released on February 15, 1967. It was distributed by Cineriz in Italy.

It was released on July 14, 1969 in Spain as Dinamita Joe.
