= Web of the Spider =

- Italian film poster
- Directed by: Antonio Margheriti
- Screenplay by: Bruno Corbucci; Giovanni Grimaldi; Antonio Margheriti; Giovanni Addessi
- Story by: Bruno Corbucci; Giovanni Grimaldi
- Produced by: Giovanni Addessi
- Starring: Anthony Franciosa; Klaus Kinski; Michèle Mercier
- Cinematography: Sandro Mancori; Memmo Mancori
- Edited by: Otello Colangeli
- Music by: Riz Ortolani
- Production companies: Produzione D.C.7; Paris Cannes Production; Terra-Filmkunst Gmbh
- Distributed by: Panta Cinematografica
- Release dates: 26 August 1971 (Italy); 16 March 1972 (West Germany); 8 February 1978 (France)
- Running time: 110 minutes
- Countries: Italy; France; West Germany
- Box office: ₤232.442 million

Web of the Spider (Italian: Nella stretta morsa del ragno) is a 1971 horror film directed by Antonio Margheriti. The film is about the writer Alan Foster (Anthony Franciosa) who accepts a bet from Edgar Allan Poe (Klaus Kinski) and his friend Thomas Blackwood (Enrico Osterman) to stay a night in Blackwood's castle. At the castle, Foster meets Blackwood's sister Elisabeth (Michèle Mercier) and Julia (Karin Field). Foster has sex with Elisabeth and wakes up to find that she was stabbed by someone whose body vanishes, allowing Foster to realize the house is possessed by ghosts.

Web of the Spider is a color remake of Margheriti's earlier film Castle of Blood.

== Plot ==
The film is narrated by a troubled Edgar Allan Poe (Klaus Kinski). It begins with Poe's attempts to confirm a ghost story by examining the ghosts' tombs. However, he doesn't go too far to avoid being haunted and killed. Later, a journalist named Alan Foster (Anthony Franciosa) visits Poe to drive him out of madness, but he is forced to challenge the horror writer on the authenticity of his stories.

This leads to Foster accepting a bet from Lord Blackwood to spend the night in a haunted castle on All Soul's Eve. Foster is surprised by ghosts who appear to be half-humans, in very effective and horrifying special effects. Ghosts of the murdered inhabitants appear to him throughout the night, re-enacting the events that led to their respective deaths and driving Foster to madness. He meets the following ghosts: Elisabeth Blackwood (Michèle Mercier), who falls in love with Foster; the annoying and easy-to-hate Julia (Karin Field); the rough criminal William Perkins (Silvano Tranquilli); and the most despicable one of all, Dr. Carmus (Peter Carsten). Near the end of the film, the ghosts reveal their true nature: they aren't actually ghosts but vampires with ghostly powers, and they need Foster's blood to maintain their existence. Because she loves him, Elisabeth tries to save Foster by aiding his escape. He succeeds in escaping the castle, but not the garden. Distracted and careless, he pushes the gate so hard that it rebounds and its metal spikes impale him. Foster's body is found, still hanging from the gate, in the morning by Poe and Lord Blackwood.

== Cast ==
- Anthony Franciosa as Alan Foster
- Michèle Mercier as Elisabeth Blackwood
- Klaus Kinski as Edgar Allan Poe
- Peter Carsten as Dr. Carmus
- Silvano Tranquilli as William Perkins
- Karin Field as Julia
- Raf Baldassarre as Herbert
- Irina Maleeva as Elsie Perkins
- Enrico Osterman as Lord Thomas Blackwood
- Marco Bonetti as Maurice

== Production ==
The film was produced by Giovanni Di Addessi, with a story credited to Bruno Corbucci and Giovanni Grimaldi and score by Riz Ortolani.

After Castle of Blood's disappointing box office, Margheriti felt he could remake the film as Web of the Spider in colour in 1970. Margheriti would later comment that it was "stupid to remake it" and that "the color cinematography destroyed everything: the atmosphere, the tension."

== Release ==
Web of the Spider was released in Italy on 26 August 1971 where it was distributed by Panta Cinematografica. The film grossed a total of 232,442,000 Italian lire on its domestic release. It received a release in West Germany as Dracula im Schloß des Schreckens on 16 March 1972. It was released later in France on 8 February 1978 as Les fantômes de Hurlevent.
