= Barbara Steele =

British actress (born 1937)

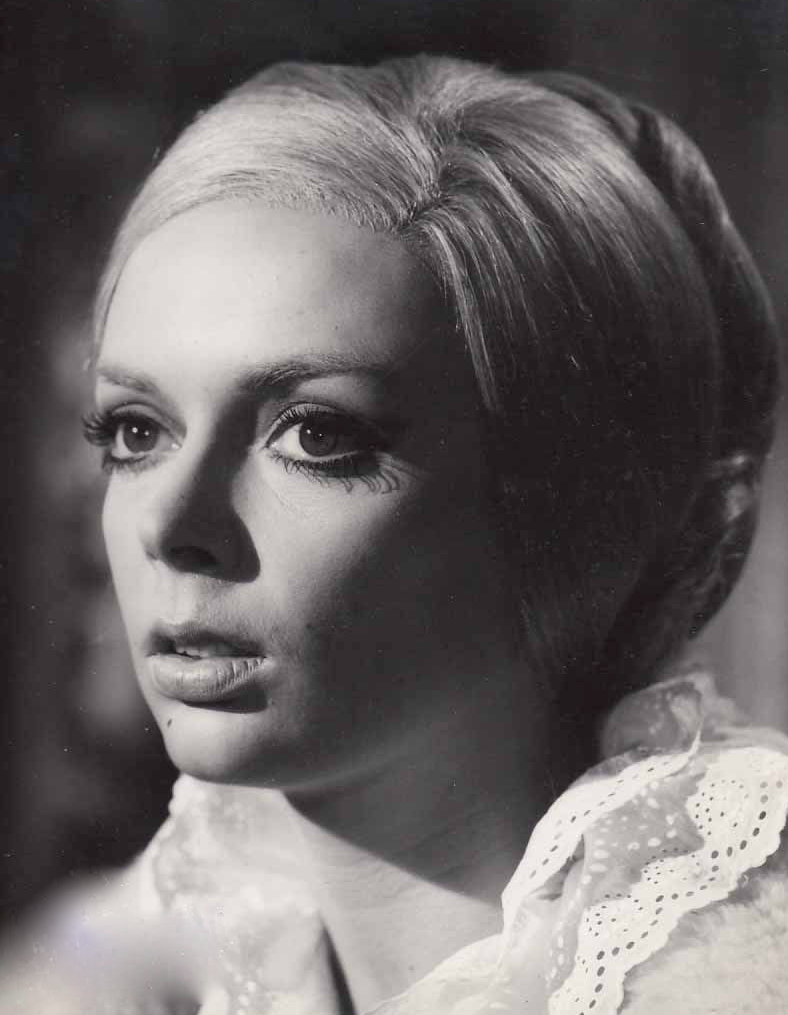
- Steele in a 1965 publicity photo
- Born: 29 December 1937 (age 88); Birkenhead, Cheshire, England
- Citizenship: United Kingdom
- Education: Chelsea College of Arts; University of Paris
- Occupations: Actress; producer
- Years active: 1958–present
- Spouse: James Poe (m. 1969; div. 1978)
- Children: 1

Barbara Steele (born 29 December 1937) is an English actress and producer, known for starring in Italian gothic horror films of the 1960s. She has been referred to as the "Queen of All Scream Queens" and "Britain's first lady of horror". She played the dual role of Asa and Katia Vajda in Mario Bava's film Black Sunday (1960), and starred in The Pit and the Pendulum (1961), The Horrible Dr. Hichcock (1962), The Long Hair of Death (1964), and Castle of Blood (1964).

Additionally, Steele had supporting roles in Federico Fellini's 8½ (1963), David Cronenberg's Shivers (1975), Joe Dante's Piranha (1978) and Louis Malle's Pretty Baby (1978), and appeared in the 1991 TV series Dark Shadows. She won a Primetime Emmy Award for producing the American television miniseries War and Remembrance (1988–1989). Steele appeared in several films in the 2010s, including a lead role in The Butterfly Room (2012) and a supporting role in Ryan Gosling's Lost River (2014).

== Early life ==
Steele was born in Birkenhead, Cheshire. She studied art at the Chelsea Art School and in Paris at the Sorbonne. Before her film career, Steele acted on stage and also worked as a model.

== Career ==
=== Early work ===
Steele was signed to a contract by the Rank Organisation. She appeared in several minor film roles during the late 1950s, including in the BAFTA-winning Sapphire (in which she appeared opposite her future Black Sunday co-star John Richardson) and Upstairs and Downstairs.

In 1960, her contract was sold to 20th Century Fox. She guest-starred in an episode of the ABC series Adventures in Paradise, and was cast as the female lead opposite Elvis Presley in the Western film Flaming Star (1960). However, after one week of principal photography, Steele left the production and was replaced by Barbara Eden. Author Adam Victor writes in The Elvis Encyclopaedia that she was fired because studio executives thought her British accent was too pronounced. However, Steele claimed she quit over a disagreement with director Don Siegel. Regardless, a March 1960 Screen Actors Guild strike led Steele to abandon her Fox contract.

=== Italians films and stardom ===
Steele travelled to Italy with the hopes of working with director Federico Fellini. Soon after her arrival, she was cast in her breakout part, the dual roles of Asa and Katia Vajda in Mario Bava's Black Sunday. There are two accounts describing how Steele came to be cast in the film: one suggests that Bava, while perusing through head shots of British actors under contract at Fox, selected Steele from these photos. Steele, however, recalled that Bava tracked her down after being captivated by photos of her in a Life magazine photoshoot. Bava later commented that Steele "had the perfect face for my films".

The success of Black Sunday launched Steele to overnight stardom and defined her status as a scream queen. She would star in a string of Italian horror films throughout the decade, including Riccardo Freda's The Horrible Dr. Hichcock (1962) and The Ghost (1963); Antonio Margheriti's The Long Hair of Death and Castle of Blood (both 1964), Terror-Creatures from the Grave and Nightmare Castle (both 1965).

She also starred in American director Roger Corman's adaptation of The Pit and the Pendulum (1961), based on Edgar Allan Poe's short story of the same title, The She Beast (1966) and the British film Curse of the Crimson Altar (1968).

Steele guest starred in television shows including the spy drama, Danger Man (aka Secret Agent) starring Patrick McGoohan in 1965. In 1961, she appeared as Phyllis in the "Beta Delta Gamma" episode of CBS's Alfred Hitchcock Presents. She also had a supporting role in Fellini's 8½ (1963), and in 1966 appeared in the second-season episode of NBC's I Spy, "Bridge of Spies".

=== Supporting parts and producer ===
Steele returned to the horror genre in the later 1970s, appearing in three horror films: David Cronenberg's Shivers (1975), Joe Dante's Piranha (1978), and The Silent Scream (1979). She also played a lesbian prison warden in Jonathan Demme's directorial debut, the women-in-prison film Caged Heat (1974). She had a supporting role in Louis Malle's critically-acclaimed period drama Pretty Baby (1978).

Steele served as associate producer of the TV miniseries, The Winds of War (1983), and was a producer for its sequel, War and Remembrance (1988), for which she shared the 1989 Emmy Award for Outstanding Drama/Comedy Special with executive producer Dan Curtis.

Steele was cast as Julia Hoffman in the 1991 remake of the 1960s ABC television series Dark Shadows. In 2010, she was a guest star in the Dark Shadows audio drama, The Night Whispers.

In 2010, actor-writer Mark Gatiss interviewed Steele about her role in Black Sunday for his BBC documentary series A History of Horror. In 2012, Gatiss again interviewed Steele about her role in Shivers for his follow-up documentary, Horror Europa. In 2014, she appeared in Ryan Gosling's directorial debut, the drama-fantasy thriller film Lost River, in which she portrayed the character Belladonna in a supporting role.

In 2017, she was inducted into the Fangoria Chainsaw Awards' Hall of Fame.

In 2020, she had a guest role on the animated series Castlevania, voicing the character Miranda.

== Personal life ==
Steele was married to American screenwriter James Poe. They were married in 1969 and divorced in 1978. Over the same period her focus changed from European (primarily Italian) films to North American ones. They have a son, Jonathan.

== Filmography ==
=== Film ===
Year	Title	Role(s)	Notes	Refs.
1958	Bachelor of Hearts	Fiona		
1959	The 39 Steps	Bit part	Uncredited	
1959	Sapphire	Student	Uncredited	
1959	The Heart of a Man	Girl	Deleted role	
1959	Upstairs and Downstairs	Mary		
1960	Your Money or Your Wife	Juliet Frost		
1960	Black Sunday	Asa Vajda, Katia Vajda		
1961	The Pit and the Pendulum	Elizabeth Barnard Medina		
1962	The Horrible Dr. Hichcock	Cynthia		
1962	Il capitano di ferro	Floriana		
1963	8½	Gloria Morin		
1963	The Hours of Love	Leila		
1963	The Ghost	Margaret Hichcock		
1963	A Sentimental Attempt	Silvia		
1964	Castle of Blood	Elisabeth Blackwood		
1964	I maniaci	Barbara, Mrs. Brugnoli	Segments: "L'hobby" and "La Cambiale"	
1964	Les baisers	Thelma	Segment: "Baiser du Soir"	
1964	White Voices	Giulia		
1964	Three for a Robbery	Barbara Sims		
1964	The Monocle Laughs	Valérie		
1964	Amore facile	Contessa Bardi-Stucchi	Segment "Divorzio italo-americano"	
1964	The Long Hair of Death	Helen Karnstein, Mary Karnstein		
1965	Terror-Creatures from the Grave	Cleo Hauff		
1965	Nightmare Castle	Muriel, Jenny		
1965	Once Upon a Tractor	Lady Clerk		
1965	I soldi			
1966	Young Törless	Bozena		
1966	For Love and Gold	Teodora		
1966	The She Beast	Veronica		
1966	An Angel for Satan	Harriet Montebruno, Belinda		
1968	Curse of the Crimson Altar	Lavinia Morley		
1970	Fermate il mondo... voglio scendere!	Danielle		
1974	Caged Heat	Superintendent McQueen		
1975	Shivers	Betts		
1977	I Never Promised You a Rose Garden		Deleted role	
1978	Pretty Baby	Josephine		
1978	Piranha	Dr. Mengers		
1978	La clé sur la porte	Cathy		
1979	Silent Scream	Victoria Engels		
1995	Tief oben	Mrs. Wagner		
1998	The Prophet	Agent Oakley		
2008	The Boneyard Collection	Vanessa Peabody	Segment: "Her Morbid Desires"	
2012	The Butterfly Room	Ann		
2014	Lost River	Grandmother		
2016	Minutes Past Midnight	The Apparition of the Mill	Segment "The Mill at Calder's End"	
2023	Ulalume - A Ballad	Opening Narrator (voice)		

==== Short films ====
Year	Title	Role	Notes	Refs.
1965	Once Upon a Tractor	Lady Clerk		
1967	Barbara et ses fourrures			
1968	La amante estelar			
1968	Handicap			
2014	The Shutterbug Man	Narrator (voice)		
2015	The Mill at Calder's End	The Apparition of the Mill		
2016	Le Fantôme	The Widow		

=== Television ===
Year	Title	Role	Notes
1958	Dial 999	Toni Miller	S01E06: "Missing Persons"
1960	Adventures in Paradise	Dolores	S02E10: "Daughter of Illusion"
1961	Alfred Hitchcock Presents	Phyllis	S07E06: "Betta Delta Gamma"
1965	Danger Man	Cleo	S02E12: "The Man on the Beach"
1966	I Spy	Giana	S02E09: "Bridge of Spies"
1972	Night Gallery	The Widow Craighill	S02E21: "The Sins of the Fathers"
1991	Dark Shadows	Dr. Julia Hoffman, Countess Natalie Du Pres	Main cast
2020	Castlevania	Miranda (voice)	S03E07: "Worse Things Than Betrayal"

==== TV films, miniseries, and specials ====
Year	Title	Role	Notes
1969	Honeymoon with a Stranger	Carla	
1978	The Space-Watch Murders		
1983	The Winds of War	Mrs. Stoller	Also associate producer
1988	War and Remembrance	Elsa MacMahon	Also producer
1996	Dark Shadows 30th Anniversary Tribute	n/a	Producer only

== Awards and nominations ==
Award	Year	Category	Work	Result	Ref.
Primetime Emmy Award	1989	Outstanding Miniseries	War and Remembrance	Won	
Fangoria Chainsaw Award	2017	Hall of Fame	—N/a	Won	
