= Alassio wall =

Artistic monument in Alassio, Italy

Coordinates: 44°00′27″N 8°10′22″E

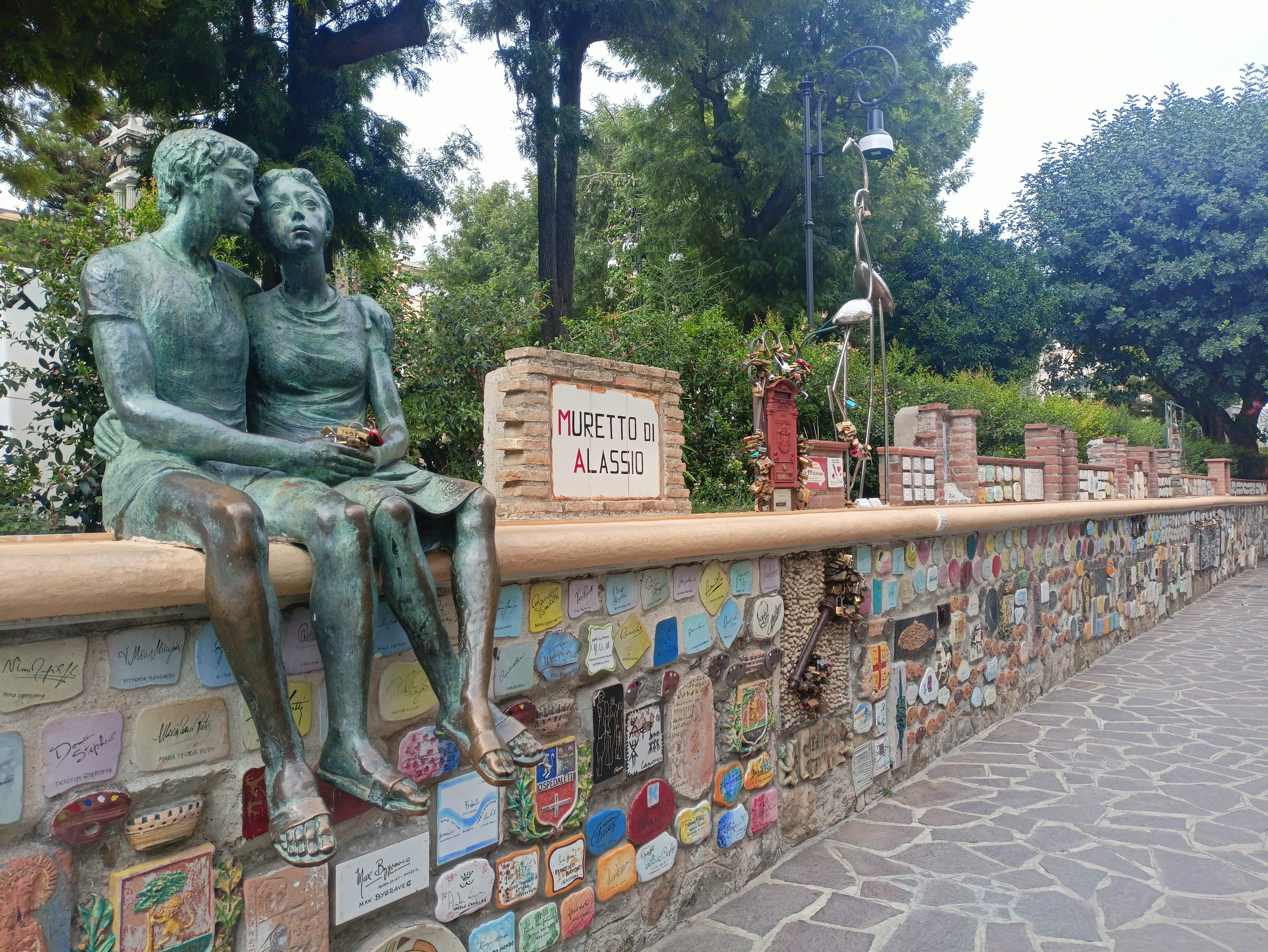
The Muretto in 2022

The Alassio wall (Italian: Muretto di Alassio; Ligurian: Miâgetta d'Arasce, locally Miâietta) is a "Walk of Fame"-style monument in the town of Alassio, Liguria, Italy.

It consists of a wall near the beach decorated with ceramic tiles signed by many well-known Italian and international people.

== Description ==
Between 1951 and 1953, the Italian painter Mario Berrino wanted to decorate the empty wall near his coffee shop. At the time, his cafè was attended by some famous international artist, like Ernest Hemingway. When Berrino asked Hemingway about the idea, he was enthusiastic.

A beauty pageant, show called "Miss Muretto", took place from 1953 to 2013, contributing to launch Italian stars such as Simona Ventura.

Starting in 2013, the American artist Sandra Cache started to decorate a new wall, near to the original one, with plates depicting pets, especially dogs and guide dogs.

== Gallery ==
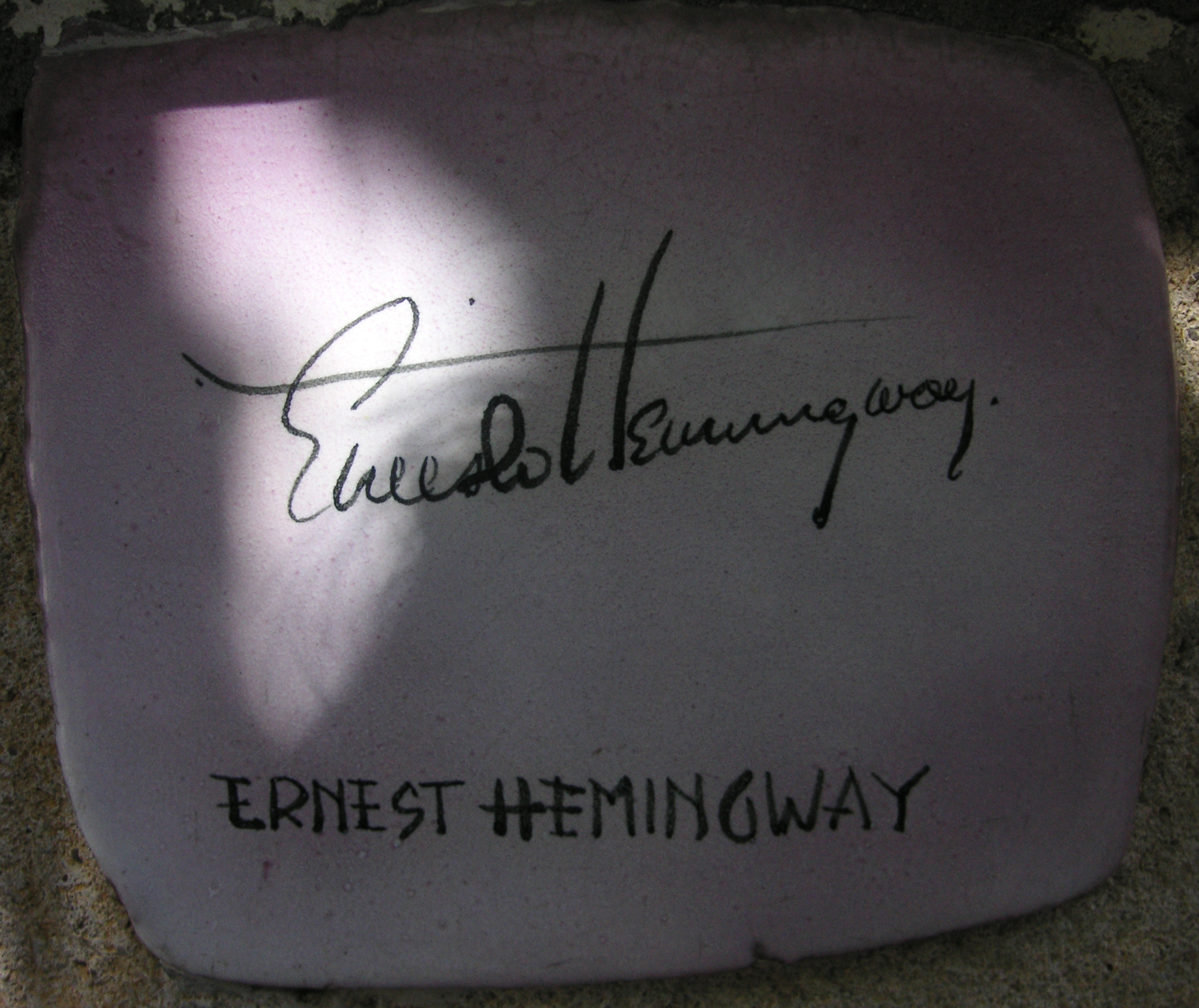
Plate and signature of Ernest Hemingway

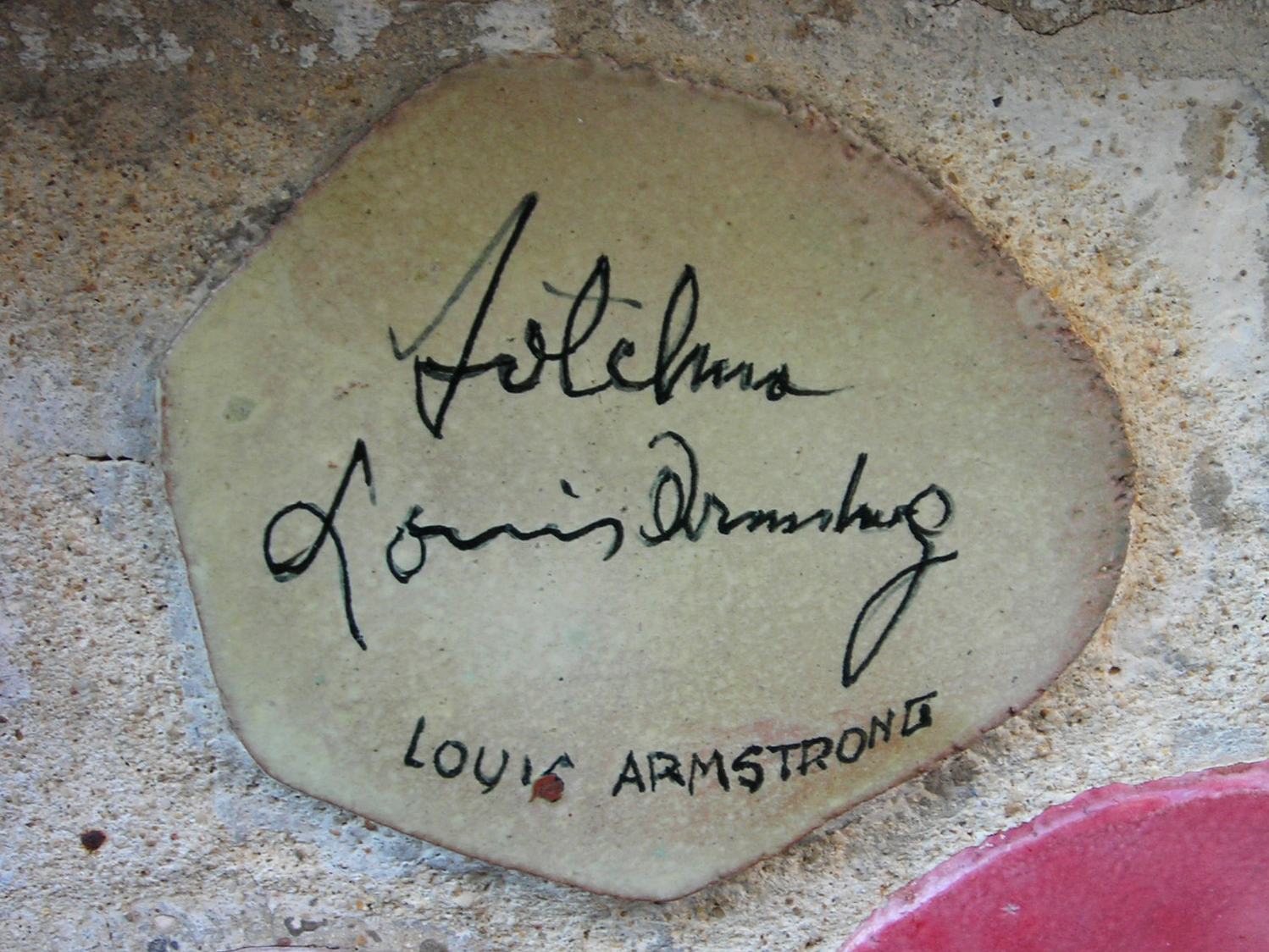
Plate and signature of Louis Armstrong

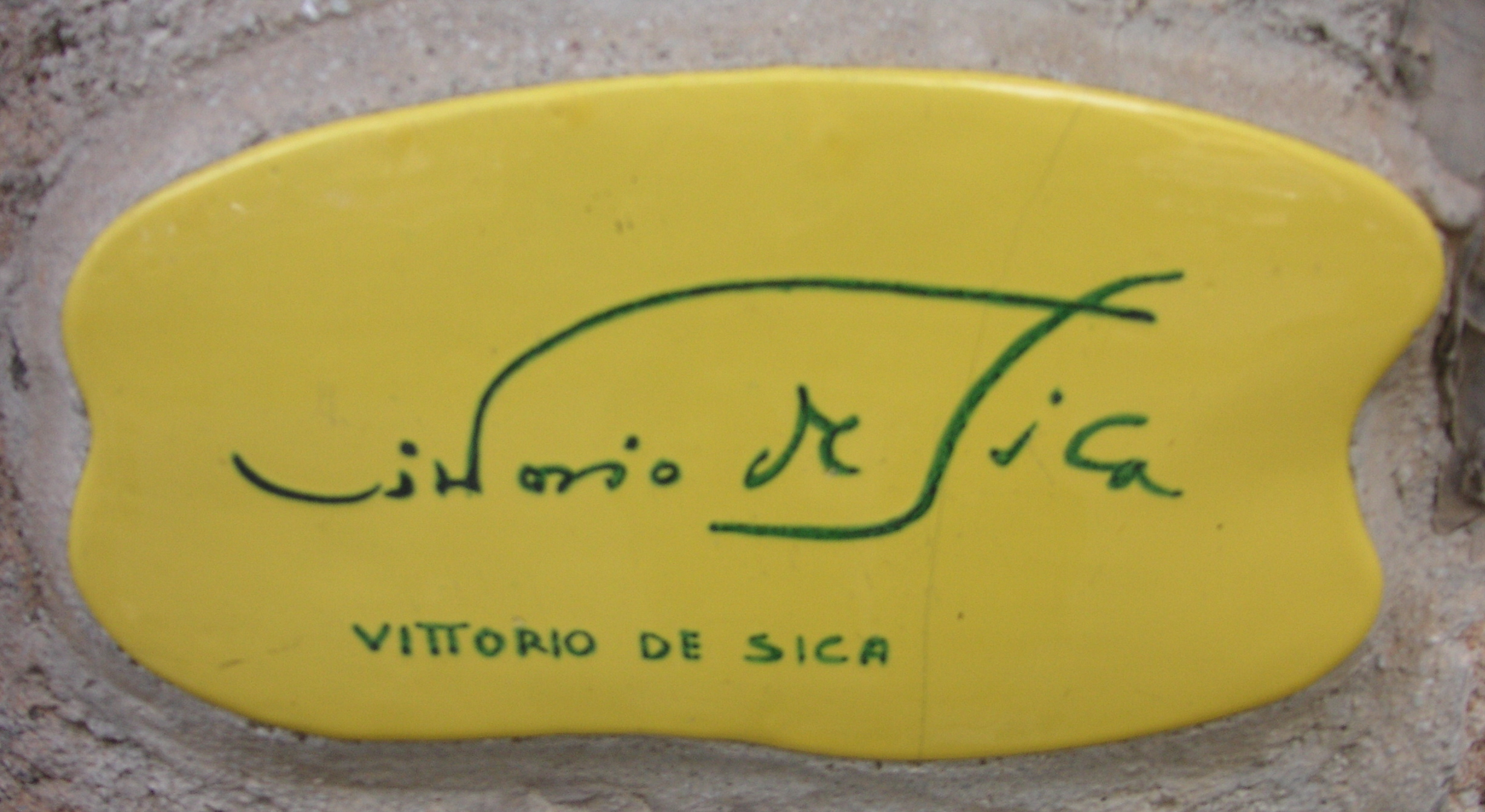
Plate and signature of Vittorio De Sica

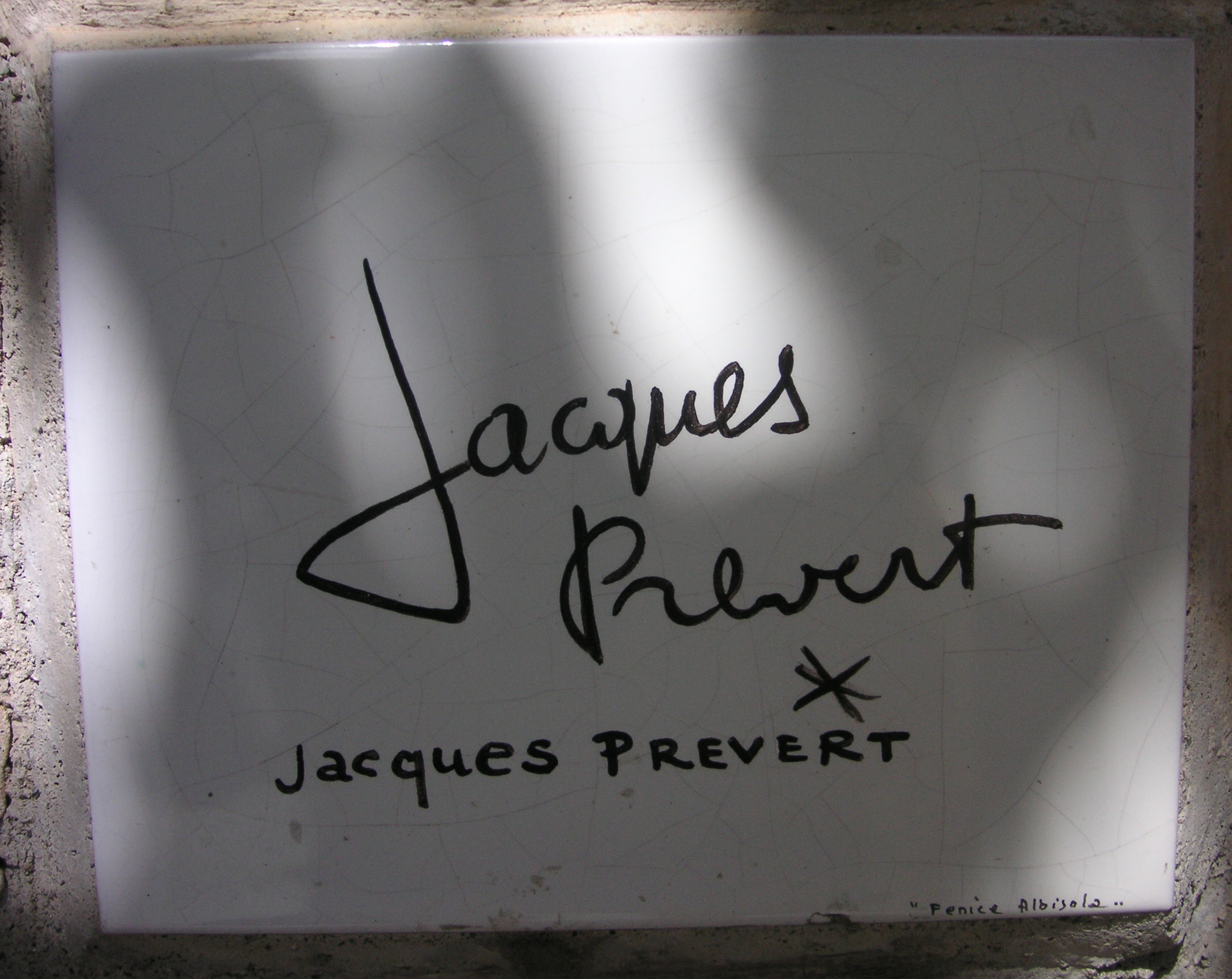
Plate and signature of Jacques Prévert

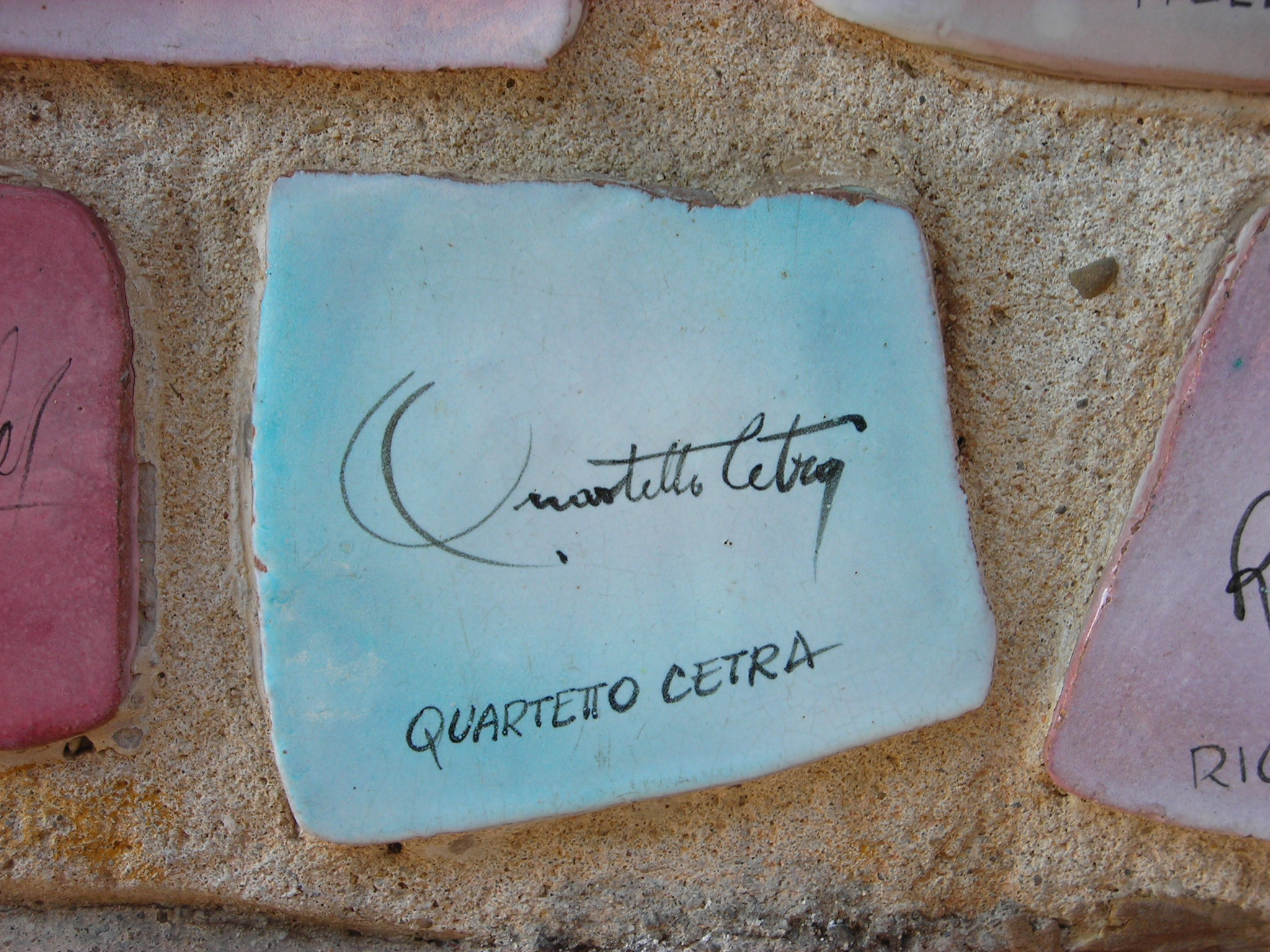
Plate of Quartetto Cetra

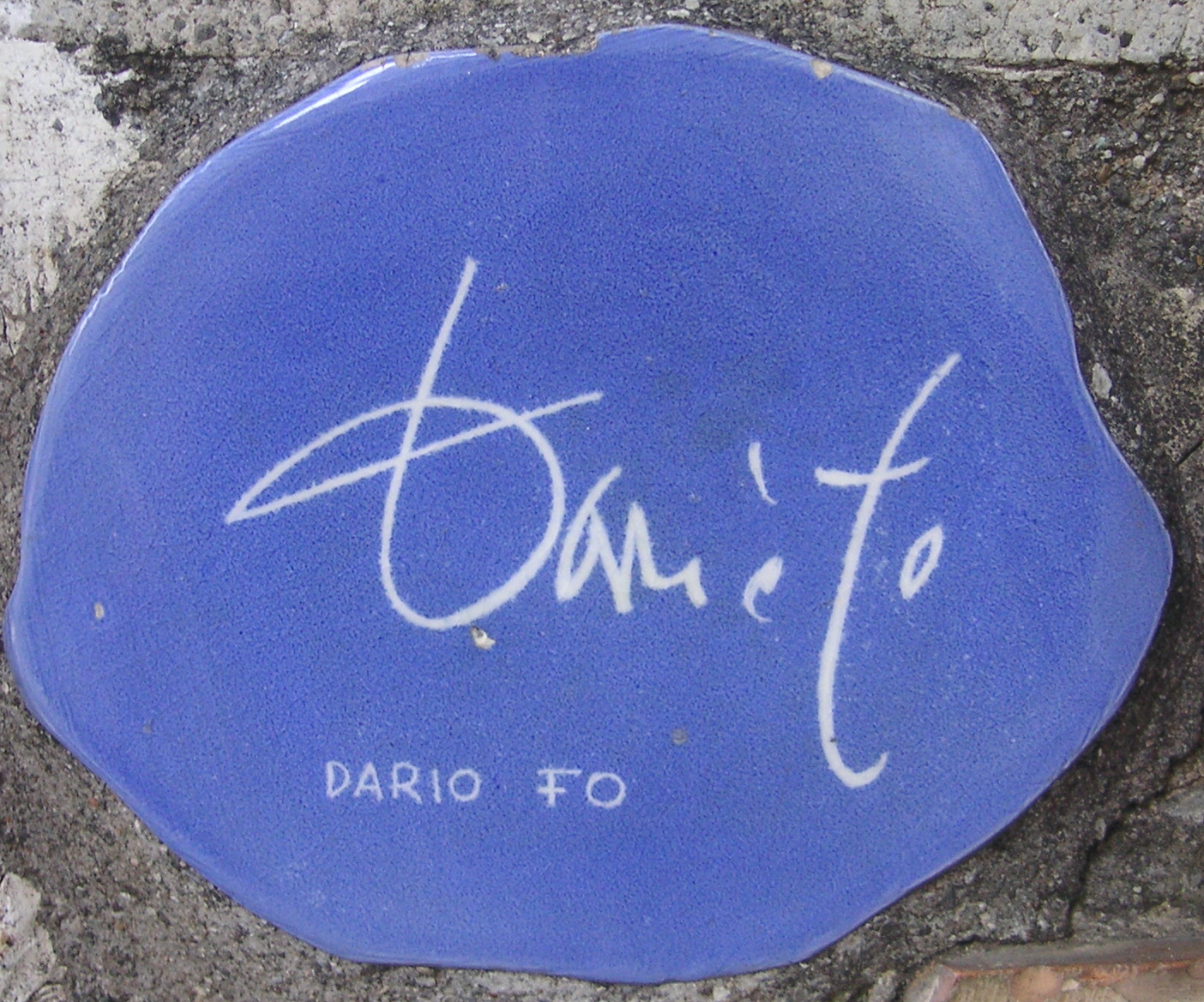
Plate and signature of Dario Fo

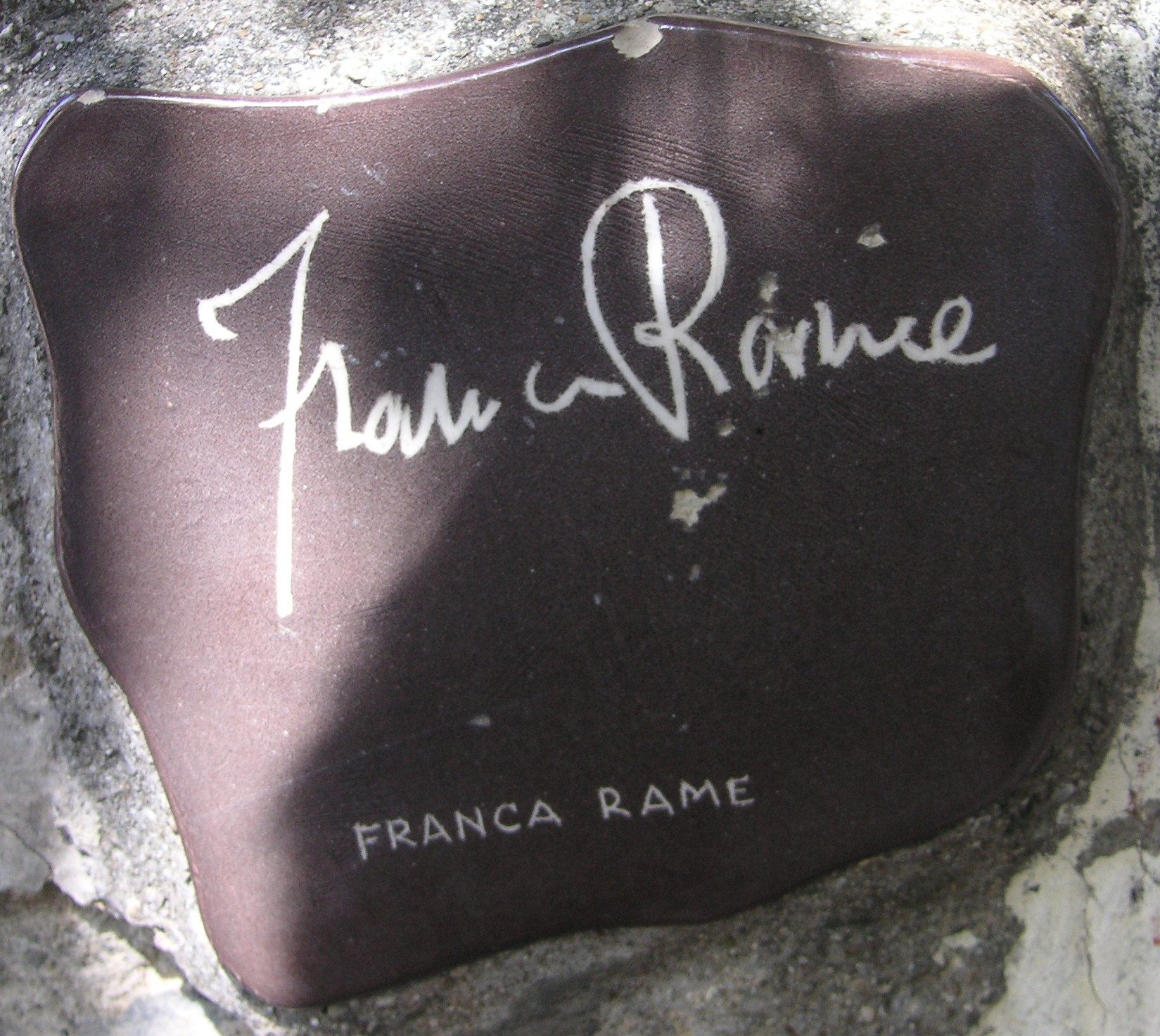
Plate and signature of Franca Rame

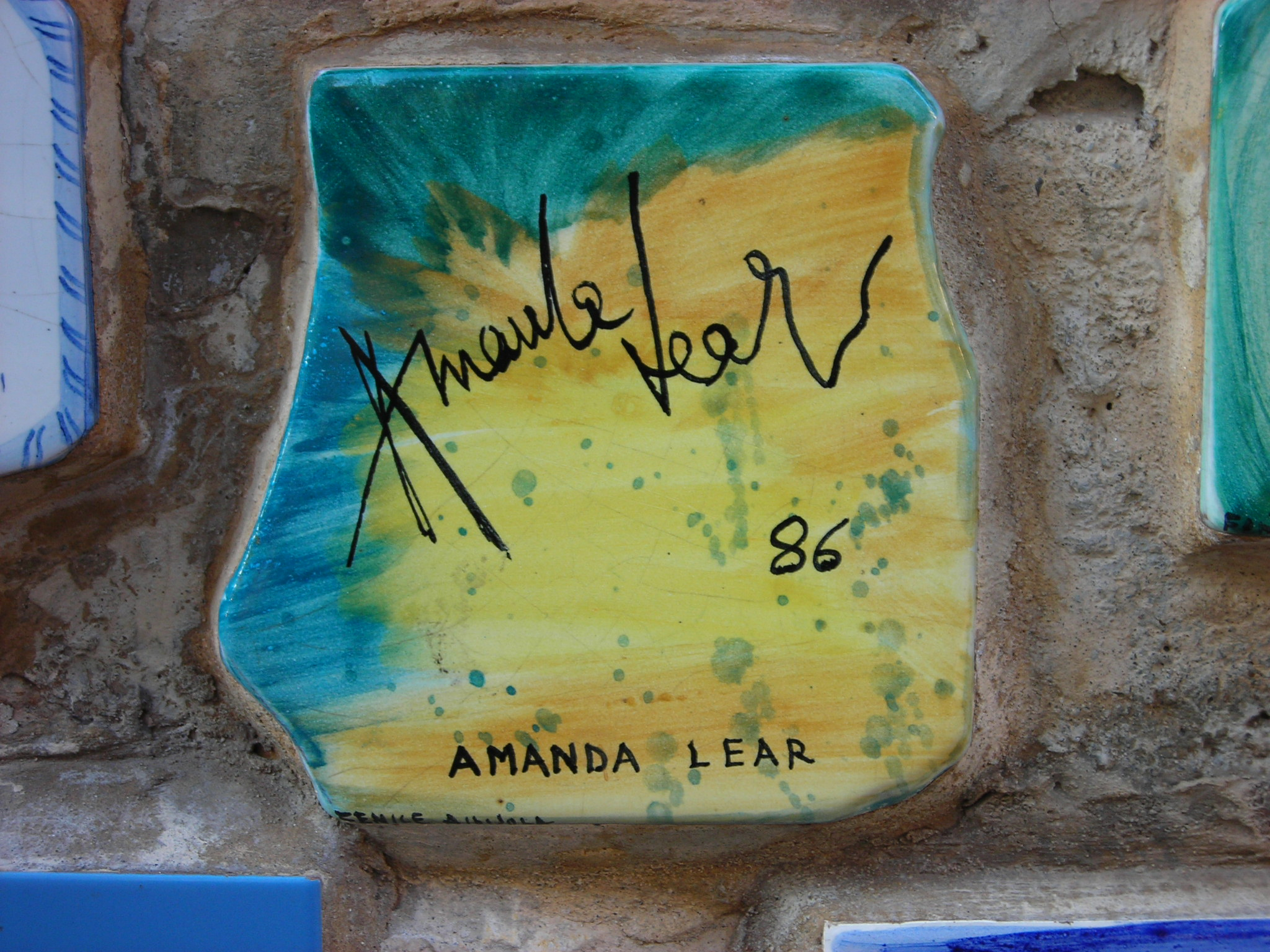
Plate and signature of Amanda Lear
