= Alassio =

Alassio Arasce (Ligurian)
- Comune
- Città di Alassio
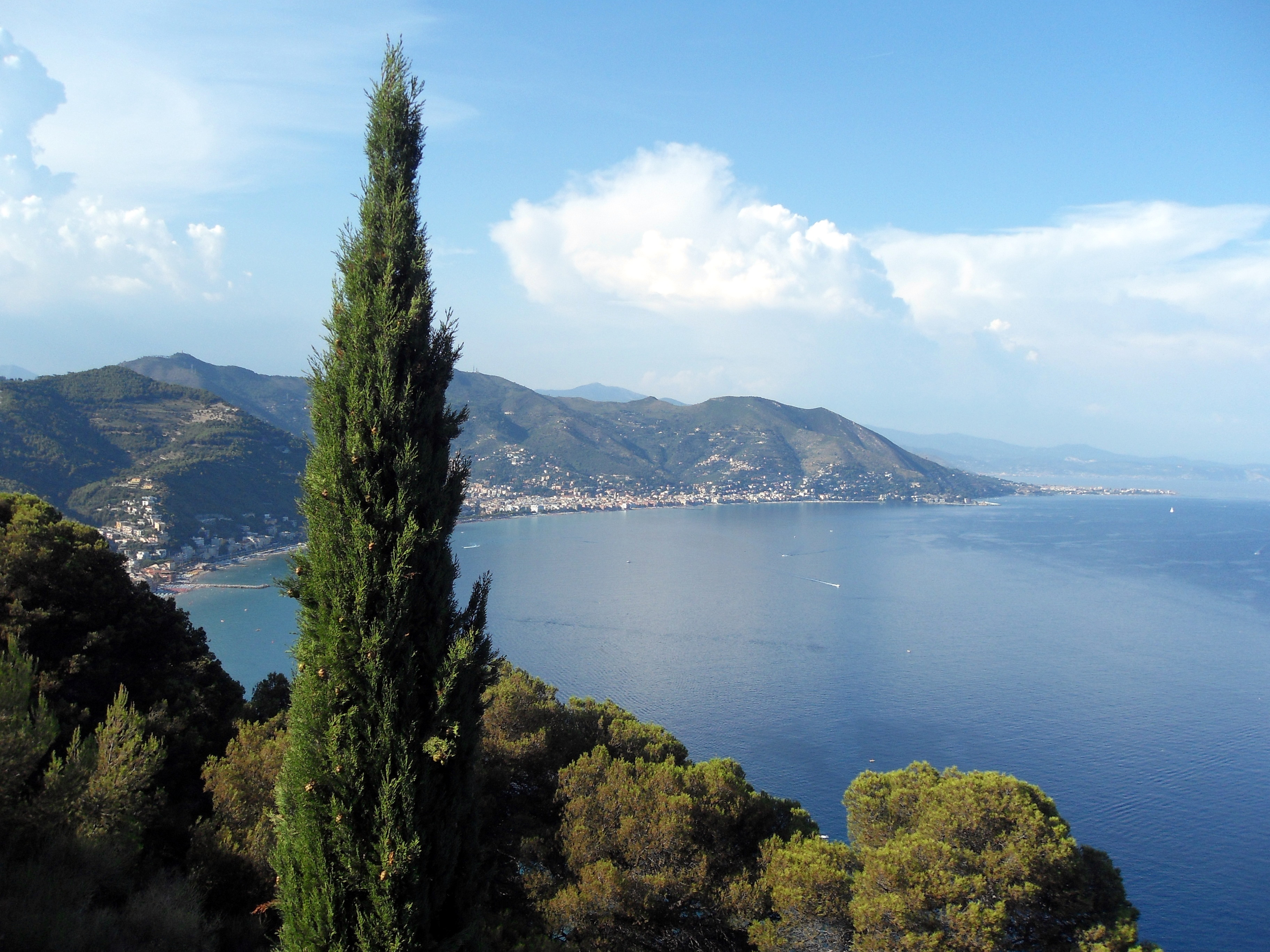
- Alassio from Cape Mele

- Flag Coat of arms
- Nickname: The City of the Muretto"
- Location of Alassio in Italy Alassio (Liguria)
- Coordinates: 44°00′N 08°10′E
- Country: Italy
- Region: Liguria
- Province: Savona (SV)
- Frazioni: Moglio, Solva, Caso

Government
  - Mayor: Marco Melgrati (Ind.)

Area
  - Total: 17 km^{2} (6.6 sq mi)
- Elevation: 6 m (20 ft)

Population (31 December 2015)
  - Total: 10,934
  - Density: 640/km^{2} (1,700/sq mi)
- Demonym: Alassians (in italian: alassini)
- Time zone: UTC+1 (CET)
  - Summer (DST): UTC+2 (CEST)
- Postal code: 17021
- Dialing code: 0182
- Patron saint: St. Ambrose
- Saint day: 7 December
- Website: Official website

Alassio (Italian: [aˈlassjo]; Ligurian: Arasce [aˈɾaʃːe] or Arasci) is a resort town on the Italian Riviera. It is in the province of Savona situated in the western coast of Liguria, Northern Italy, approximately 80 kilometres (50 miles) from the French border.

Alassio is known for its natural and scenic views. The town centre is crossed by a pedestrianised cobbled road known as the Budello.

The town has sandy beaches, blue sea and many bars and restaurants on the sea front. Alassio has also a pier known as Molo di Alassio or Pontile Bestoso which offers views of the town. The town is famous for its Muretto di Alassio, a wall with signatures onto coloured ceramic tiles.

Alassio is situated on the Riviera di Ponente (western side of the Italian Riviera), and it has a small tourist port (porticciolo) named after Luca Ferrari. It is known as a health resort in winter and a bathing place in summer, and has many hotels.

Alassio was the start of stage 7 of the 2023 Giro Donne won by Annemiek van Vleuten.

== Heritage ==
The English composer Edward Elgar wrote a concert-overture called In the South (Alassio) whilst staying on holiday in Alassio in the winter of 1903–04.

Alassio is featured as the location for a holiday in the 1944 film The Children Are Watching Us.

The painter Felix Nussbaum (1904–1944) stayed in Alassio in 1934 and it appears on many of his lighter paintings. The painters Helen Frankenthaler and her husband Robert Motherwell summered and worked there in 1960.

Actress Lisa Gastoni was born in Alassio in 1935.

== International relations ==
=== Twin towns – Sister cities ===
Alassio is twinned with:

- La Thuile, Italy (2013)

== Sources ==
- Chisholm, Hugh, ed. (1911). "Alassio" . Encyclopædia Britannica. Vol. 1 (11th ed.). Cambridge University Press. p. 478.
- Kennedy, Michael (1987). Portrait of Elgar (Third ed.). Oxford University Press. ISBN 0-19-284017-7.

== See also ==
- Alassio wall
