= Castle of Blood =

1964 film

- Italian theatrical release poster
- Italian: Danza Macabra
- Directed by: Antonio Margheriti
- Screenplay by: Gianni Grimaldi; Bruno Corbucci
- Produced by: Franco Belotti; Walter Zarghetta
- Starring: Barbara Steele; Georges Rivière; Margarete Robsahm; Arturo Dominici; Silvano Tranquilli; Umberto Raho
- Cinematography: Riccardo Pallottini
- Edited by: Otello Colangeli
- Music by: Riz Ortolani
- Production companies: Era Cinematografica; Leo Lax Films
- Distributed by: Globe International Film
- Release dates: 27 February 1964 (Italy); 14 April 1965 (France)
- Running time: 82 minutes
- Countries: Italy; France
- Box office: ₤100.68 million

Castle of Blood (Italian: Danza Macabra, lit. 'Dance Macabre') is a 1964 gothic horror film directed by Antonio Margheriti and starring Barbara Steele, Georges Rivière, Margarete Robsahm, Arturo Dominici, Silvano Tranquilli and Umberto Raho. It was an Italian-French co-production.

The film was initially commissioned to director Sergio Corbucci, who had Gianni Grimaldi and Bruno Corbucci set to write the film. A scheduling conflict led to Corbucci's friend Margheriti being hired to complete the film. To avoid going over time, Corbucci was brought in to film one scene.

The film was released in Italy in 1964 and received low box office numbers, which led to Margheriti remaking the film in colour as Web of the Spider (1971).

== Plot ==
A journalist challenges the authenticity of Edgar Allan Poe's stories (which are presented in the context of the film as Poe's eyewitness accounts of the supernatural, not as literary fiction). To prove himself, the journalist accepts a bet from Lord Blackwood to spend the night in a haunted castle on the night between All Saints’ Day and All Souls’ Day. Ghosts of the murdered inhabitants appear to him throughout the night, re-enacting the events that led to their deaths. One of the ghosts reveals that they all need his blood in order to maintain their existence. Barbara Steele plays a ghost who attempts to help the journalist escape.

== Cast ==
- Barbara Steele as Elisabeth Blackwood
- Georges Rivière as Alan Foster
- Margarete Robsahm as Julia
- Arturo Dominici as Dr. Carmus
- Silvano Tranquilli as Edgar Allan Poe
- Umberto Raho as Lord Thomas Blackwood
- Giovanni Cianfriglia as Herbert
- Salvo Randone as Lester
- Benito Stefanelli as William Perkins
- Sylvia Sorrente as Elsie Perkins
- Ennio Antonelli as Jonathan

== Production ==
The idea for Castle of Blood came to Sergio Corbucci when producer Giovanni Addessi commissioned him to create a film that would reuse the Medieval sets from Corbucci's comedy film The Monk of Monza. Corbucci had his brother Bruno Corbucci and screenwriter Gianni Grimaldi write the script. The script is credited to a short story by Edgar Allan Poe, but the film is not based on any specific Poe work. The English-language version credits the (fictional) short story "Dance Macabre," which is the original Italian title of the film.

According to Ruggero Deodato, who was the assistant director on set, he persuaded actress Barbara Steele to star in the film, although Steele had just done 8½ for director Federico Fellini, and wanted to distance herself from horror films. When filming was about to begin, Sergio Corbucci found that his schedule conflicted with the shoot and called upon his friend Antonio Margheriti to direct the film.

Margheriti had a tight schedule for filming, and shot the film using the same method as a television production by setting up four cameras at once. To finish the film on time, Margheriti brought in Sergio Corbucci to direct the scene where Giovanni Cianfriglia's characters murder Steele's character. The film was eventually shot in 15 days.

== Release ==
Castle of Blood was distributed in Italy by Globe International Film and released on 27 February 1964. The film grossed a total of 100.68 million Italian lire in Italy. It was released in France on 14 April 1965 under the title "Danse Macabre" (Dance of Death). The French cut of the film features actress Sylvia Sorrente in a nude scene.

The film's disappointing box office was one of the reasons that Margheriti remade the film as Web of the Spider in colour in 1970. Margheriti would later comment that it was "stupid to remake it" and that "the color cinematography destroyed everything: the atmosphere, the tension."

== Critical reception ==
From contemporary reviews, The Globe and Mail praised the film, noting an "ingenious script" and the acting by Georges Rivière, stating that the film was an "example of how an imaginative director can use camera, music, and a deliberately slow pace to fray the nerve ends." The review critiqued the ghost special effects as "unconvincing", and found Barbara Steele's performance to be melodramatic. The Monthly Film Bulletin praised the cinematography of the film but referred to Ortolani's score as "cliche-ridden", and wrote negatively about Steele's acting and the dubbed dialogue.

Margheriti would later call the film "even more boring" many years after its initial release. AllMovie's review of the film was favorable, calling it an "eerie and effective early horror film."

== Remake ==
Margheriti remade the film in colour in 1971, as Web of the Spider.

== See also ==
- List of French films of 1964
- List of horror films of 1964
- List of Italian films of 1964
