= An Angel for Satan =

- Italian theatrical release poster
- Directed by: Camillo Mastrocinque
- Screenplay by: Giuseppe Mangione; Camillo Mastrocinque
- Based on: A novel by Luigi Emmanuele
- Produced by: Liliana Biancini
- Cinematography: Giuseppe Aquari
- Edited by: Gisa Radicchi
- Music by: Francesco De Masi
- Production company: Discobolo Film
- Distributed by: Discobolo Film
- Release date: 4 May 1966 (Italy)
- Country: Italy
- Language: 90 minutes
- Box office: ₤87 million

An Angel for Satan (Italian: Un angelo per Satana) is a 1966 Italian horror film directed by Camillo Mastrocinque. It stars Barbara Steele in a dual role, as Harriet Montebruno / Belinda, and is set in a small Italian village by a lake. It is based on a short novel by Luigi Emmanuele. This was Barbara Steele's last "Italian Gothic".

== Plot ==
The Countess of Montebruno, returning to her birthright, requests an old statue revealed in a lake be refurbished by an artist, despite it being associated with a curse. Mysterious deaths begin to occur with the villagers associating it with the return of the Countess Harriet Montebruno and the statue. The Countess' personality begins to change, taking on the personna of Belinda, the woman of the statue, seducing and influencing the villagers towards her will. The artist remains suspicious and believes not all is what it appears to be.

== Cast ==
- Barbara Steele as Harriet Montebruno / Belinda
- Claudio Gora as Count Montebruno
- Ursula Davis as Rita
- Anthony Steffen as Roberto Merigi
- Marina Berti as Illa
- Aldo Berti as Victor
- Mario Brega as Carlo Lionesi
- Vassili Karis as Dario, the Teacher

== Release ==
An Angel for Satan was released in Italy on 4 May 1966 where it was distributed by Discobolo Film. It grossed 87 million Italian lira on its release. In 2021, the film was released on DVD and Blu-Ray in the United States by Severin Films.

== See also ==
- List of Italian films of 1966
- List of horror films of 1966
