= List of number-one singles of 2004 (Spain) =

This is a list of the Spanish PROMUSICAE Top 20 physical Singles number-ones of 2004.

Issue date	Song	Artist(s)	Reference
January 4	"Motivos de un sentimiento"	Joaquín Sabina	
January 11	"Uno más uno son siete"	Fran Perea	
January 18	"The Unnamed Feeling"	Metallica	
January 25	"The Unnamed Feeling"	Metallica	
February 1	"The Unnamed Feeling"	Metallica	
February 8	"Bulería"	David Bisbal	
February 15	"Fuente de energía"	Estopa	
February 22	"Fuente de energía"	Estopa	
February 29	"Fuente de energía"	Estopa	
March 7	"Fuente de energía"	Estopa	
March 14	"Amazing"	George Michael	
March 21	"Love Profusion"	Madonna	
March 28	"Left Outside Alone"	Anastacia	
April 4	"Dragostea din tei"	O-Zone	
April 11	"Retorciendo palabras"	Fangoria	
April 18	"Retorciendo palabras"	Fangoria	
April 25	"Retorciendo palabras"	Fangoria	
May 2	"Para llenarme de ti"	Ramón	
May 9	"Dragostea din tei"	O-Zone	
May 16	"Que tengas suertecita"	Bunbury	
May 23	"Dragostea din tei"	O-Zone	
May 30	"Música para una boda"	Nacho Cano y la OSM	
June 6	"Música para una boda"	Nacho Cano y la OSM	
June 13	"Música para una boda"	Nacho Cano y la OSM	
June 20	"Dragostea din tei"	O-Zone	
June 27	"Y además es imposible"	Los Planetas	
July 4	"Y además es imposible"	Los Planetas	
July 11	"Y además es imposible"	Los Planetas	
July 18	"Mis adorables vecinos"	Sheila	
July 25	"Mis adorables vecinos"	Sheila	
August 1	"Mis adorables vecinos"	Sheila	
August 8	"Dirás que estoy loco"	Miguel Ángel Muñoz	
August 15	"Dirás que estoy loco"	Miguel Ángel Muñoz	
August 22	"Dirás que estoy loco"	Miguel Ángel Muñoz	
August 29	"Dirás que estoy loco"	Miguel Ángel Muñoz	
September 5	"Dirás que estoy loco"	Miguel Ángel Muñoz	
September 12	"Mein Teil"	Rammstein	
September 19	"Dirás que estoy loco"	Miguel Ángel Muñoz	
September 26	"Dirás que estoy loco"	Miguel Ángel Muñoz	
October 3	"Dirás que estoy loco"	Miguel Ángel Muñoz	
October 10	"Dirás que estoy loco"	Miguel Ángel Muñoz	
October 17	"Mis adorables vecinos"	Sheila	
October 24	"Enjoy the Silence"	Depeche Mode	
October 31	"La mano en el fuego"	Fangoria	
November 7	"Just Lose It"	Eminem	
November 14	"Vertigo"	U2	
November 21	"Vertigo"	U2	
November 28	"Vertigo"	U2	
December 5	"Todo nos parece una mierda"	Astrud	
December 12	"Vertigo"	U2	
December 19	"Do They Know It's Christmas?"	Band Aid 20	
December 26	"Do They Know It's Christmas?"	Band Aid 20	

== See also ==
- 2004 in music
- List of number-one hits in Spain
