= Yaiza Esteve =

Spanish actress and singer

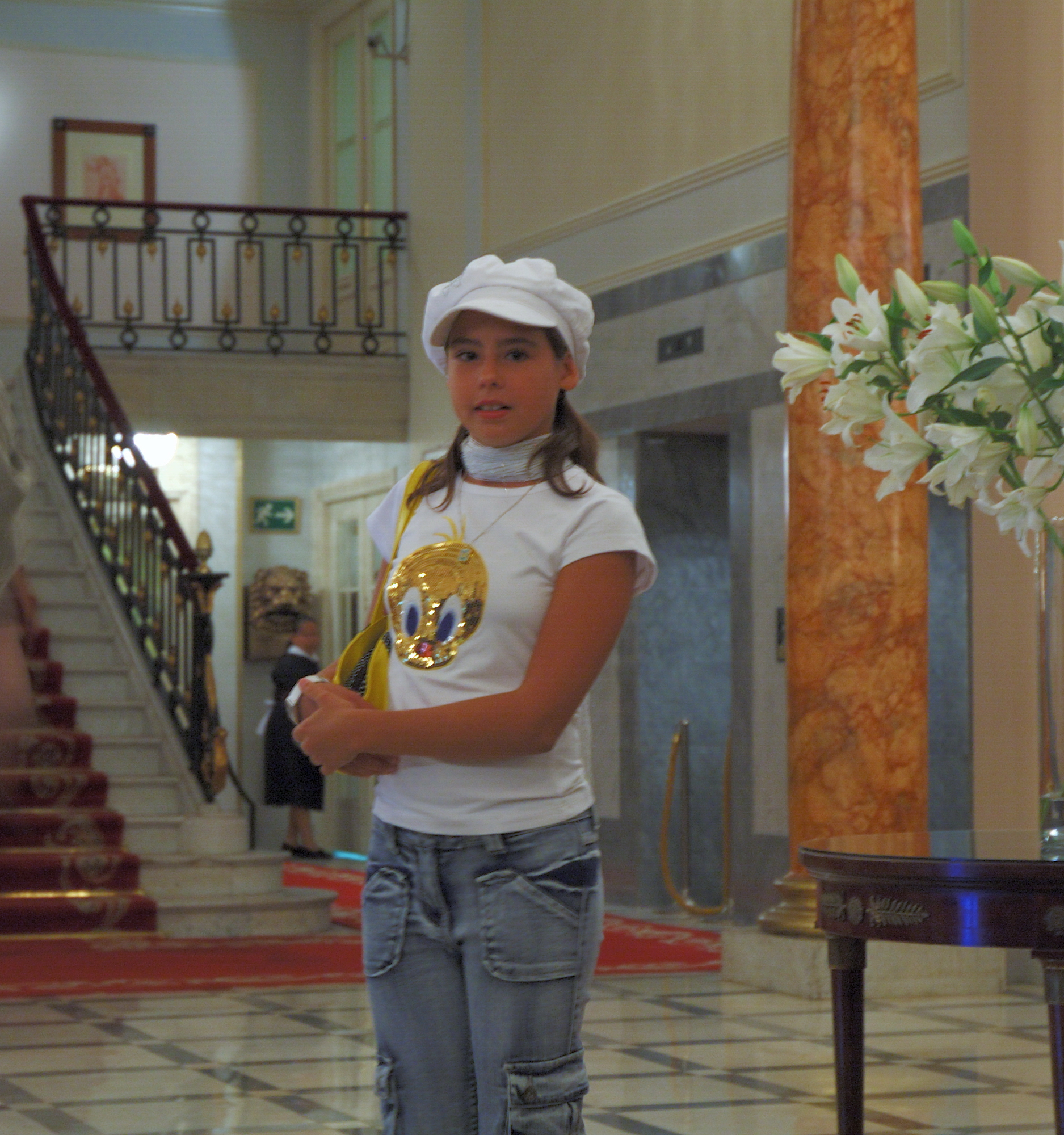
- Yaiza Esteve at the 2006 San Sebastián International Film Festival
- Born: Yaiza Pérez Esteve; 22 February 1994 (age 31); Madrid, Spain
- Other names: Sheila (character from Mis adorables vecinos)
- Occupations: Actress; singer

Yaiza Pérez Esteve (born 22 February 1994 in Madrid) is a Spanish actress and singer. She is best known as the child actress who played Sheila in the TV series Mis adorables vecinos. The series also launched her singing career. As Sheila, she published a single, which was number one in Spain for four weeks, an album, and two music videos.

As of January 2014, at the age of 19, she was playing in the theater, in a play called Aventuras en el Jurásico that was at the moment touring three cities in Spain. It was also reported that she hadn't wanted to continue acting studies and was studying administration and company management.

== Acting roles ==
=== Feature-length films ===
- Sólo mía (2001, dir. by Javier Balaguer)
- The Backwoods (2006, dir. by Koldo Serra)
- Proyecto Dos (2008)

=== Short films ===
- Barro
- Corre, Adrián (2004)

=== TV series ===
- Hospital Central (Season 3, Episode 13, 2002)
- Géminis, venganza de amor
- Paraíso (Season 3, Episode 9, 2002)
- Un lugar en el mundo (2003)
- Mis adorables vecinos (2004–2006)

=== Theatre plays ===
- El libro de la selva
- Una del oeste
- Blancanieves y los siete bajitos
- Aventuras en el Jurásico

== Discography ==
Discography as Sheila from Mis adorables vecinos.

=== Albums ===
Year	Title	Charts
Year	Title	SPA
2004	Mis adorables vecinos	82

=== Singles ===
Year	Title	Charts
Year	Title	SPA
2004	"Mis adorables vecinos"	1
