= OMG, I'm a Robot! =

- Promotional release poster
- Ani lo ma'amin ani Robot!
- Directed by: Tal Goldberg; Gal Zelezniak
- Written by: Tal Goldberg; Gal Zelezniak
- Screenplay by: Tal Goldberg; Gal Zelezniak
- Story by: Tal Goldberg; Gal Zelezniak
- Produced by: Amir Manor
- Starring: Yotam Ishay; Tzahi Grad; Hili Yalon; Dror Keren; Inna Bakelman; Rob Schneider; Nelly Tagar; David Kigler
- Cinematography: Tomer Shani
- Edited by: Yiftah Paul Shoshan
- Music by: Omri Behr; Assa Raviv
- Distributed by: Devilworks
- Release date: August 2015
- Running time: 75 minutes
- Country: Israel
- Language: Hebrew

OMG, I'm a Robot?! (Hebrew: אני לא מאמין, אני רובוט?!, tr. Ani lo ma'amin ani Robot!), also known as Robot Awakening, is a 2015 Israeli science fiction comedy film directed by Tal Goldberg and Gal Zelezniak.

Actors Yotam Ishay and Tzahi Grad co-star in the lead roles. It also presents a Jewish "R2-D2" dubbed by Rob Schneider. It was produced by Amir Manor, shot by Tomer Shani and edited by Yiftach Paul Shoshan.

== Premise ==
Danny is amazed to find out he is a deadly robot. With renewed hopes and robotic forces, and with the help of his macho boss and a small Jewish "R2D2" (Dubbed by Rob Schneider), Danny sets off to rescue the love of his life.

== Cast ==
- Yotam Ishay as Danny Bernstein
- Tzahi Grad as Goldschmidt, Danny's boss
- Hili Yalon as Noa, Danny's girlfriend
- Dror Keren as Dimitry
- Inna Bakelman as Maya
- Rob Schneider as Robo Joseph (voice only)
- Nelly Tagar as Netta
- David Kigler as Moyshe'le
- Ori Yaniv as Yossi (a bully)
- Yossi Marshek as Herzl (a bully)
- Guy Gior as Hot guy in the Park with a dog
- Lior Duvdevani as Policeman No. 1
- Ilan Kovach as Policeman No. 2

== Release ==
The film was screened at all major Israeli cinemas.

The film had his international premiere on 14 October 2016 at the Sitges Film Festival in Catalonia, Spain, and was selected as an official nominee in the festival's "Midnight Extreme" competition. In 2017 the film screened in several genre film festivals, including Italy's Fantafestival, Portugal's Fantasporto, Brazil's Fantaspoa, Boston Science Fiction Film Festival and was selected to be the opening film of the Other Worlds Austin SciFi Film Festival.

The film is available for home entertainment on Israeli video on demand.

== Reception ==
The film was nominated by the Sitges Film Festival for "Best Feature" award at the "Midnight Extreme" competition.

The film was also nominated for an Ophir Award by the Israeli Academy of Film and Television members for "Best Art Design".

It was awarded "Best Feature Film Editing" at the Other Worlds Austin SciFi Film Festival in Austin, Texas.

== Reviews ==
- Grater, Tom (23 September 2016). "Devilworks picks up Sitges premiere 'OMG, I'm A Robot!'". Screen Daily.
- Whittaker, Richard (1 November 2016). "Other Worlds Says OMG!". The Austin Chronicle.
- Lambert, Chris (17 December 2016). "OMG, I'm a Robot! as an important look into the dynamic between manliness and vulnerability". Film Colossus. Archived from the original on 2 February 2017.
- OC Movie review, The Robots Are Coming, from Israel. 26 November 2019
- Xley, Airman (6 December 2016). "OMG, I'm a Robot?!: Review". Drive-in Zeppelin. Archived from the original on 2 February 2017.
- Gilson, Che (2 March 2017). "OMG, I'm A Robot (2015) Review". UK Horror Scene. Archived from the original on 7 March 2017.
- Crivelli, Sabrina (18 January 2017). "[recensione] OMG, I'm a Robot! di Tal Goldberg e Gal Zelezniak". Il Cineocchio (in Italian).
- Nunes, Roni (26 February 2017). ""OMG, I'm a Robot!" por Roni Nunes". C7nema (in Portuguese).
