= Miguel Ángel Muñoz =

Spanish actor and singer

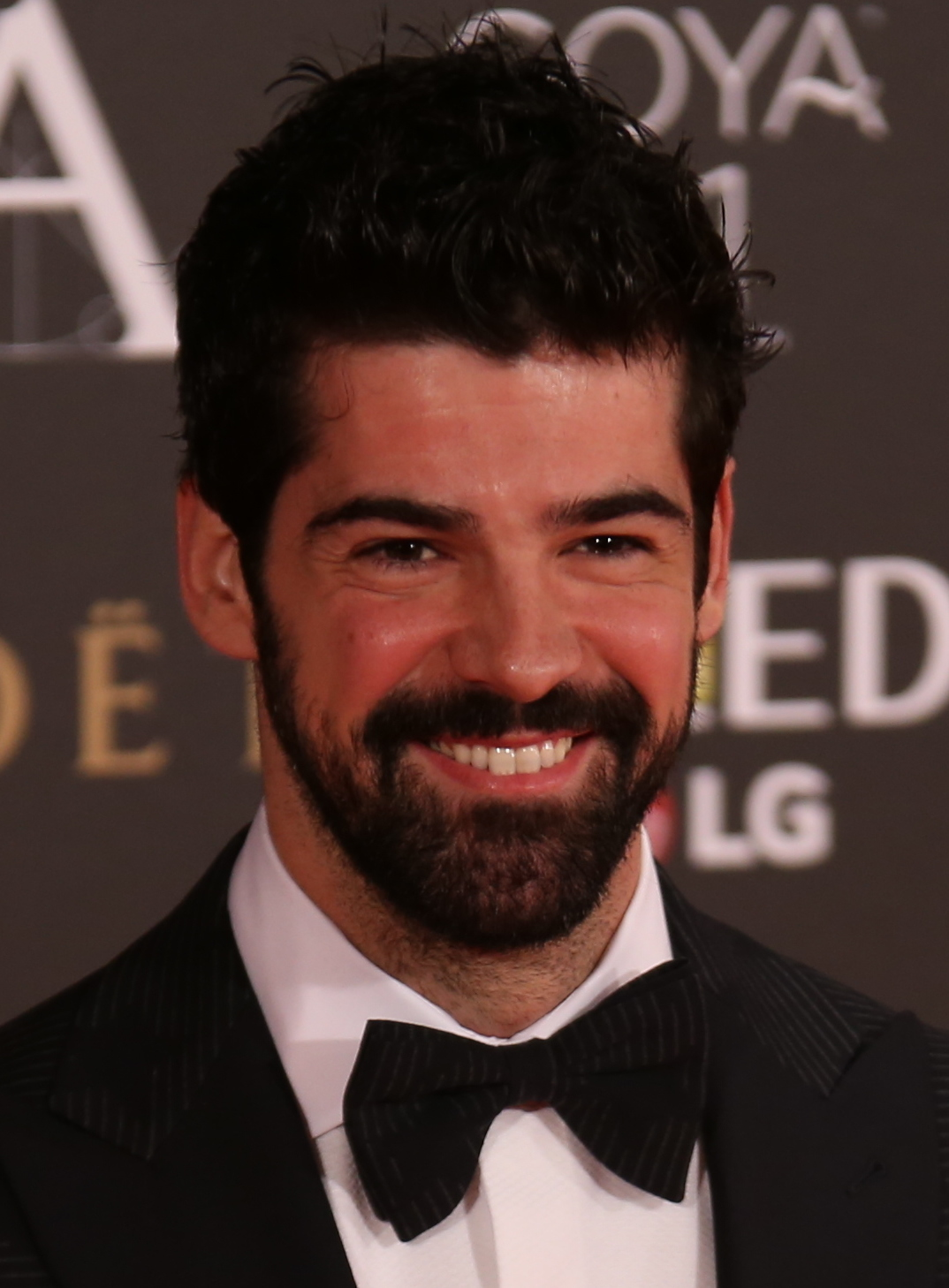
- Muñoz in 2017
- Born: Miguel Ángel Muñoz Blanco; 4 July 1983 (age 42); Madrid, Spain
- Occupations: Actor; singer
- Musical career
- Also known as: M.A.M.
- Genres: Pop music
- Instrument: Vocals
- Labels: M6 Interactions/Sony BMG

Miguel Ángel Muñoz Blanco (born 4 July 1983) is a Spanish actor and singer.

== Career ==
Muñoz began his career as an actor at the age of eleven in the film El Palomo cojo (1995), followed by many television appearances. From 1997 to 1998, he was a regular on the soap opera Al salir de clase, played a recurring character from 2000 to 2002 on the series Compañeros, and dubbed the voice of Sinbad in the Spanish version of the 2003 American animated adventure film Sinbad: Legend of the Seven Seas.

From 2002 to 2004, Muñoz starred as Roberto Arenales on the television series Un Paso Adelante, for which he took dance classes. The series, much like the American show Fame, was set in a performing arts school. It became an international hit and proved to be the breakout role for Muñoz. Muñoz joined several of his castmates to form the band Upa Dance, including: Beatriz Luengo, Pablo Puyol, Monica Cruz, Silvia Marty, Edu Del Prado and Elizabeth Jordan. The group released four albums, from 2002 to 2005, all scoring in the top 5 on the charts in Spain (two at Nº1), with one also reaching Nº1 on the charts in France.

In 2004, Muñoz released the single "Dirás que estoy loco", a song he had performed in the series. The song was ranked Nº1 in Spain for eleven consecutive weeks, selling 180 000 copies. In 2006, Muñoz released his first solo album, M.A.M., which was certified Gold in Italy and Silver in France. The album included "Dirás que estoy loco", which was released as a single across Europe, reaching Nº2 on the charts in Italy and peaking at Nº3 in France. In 2008, Muñoz won a European Border Breakers Award Award for M.A.M..

Along with his success as a recording artist, Muñoz continued acting, performing steadily on television and film, and appearing on stage in El Cartero Neruda in 2006. He also joined the series Mis Adorables Vecinos in 2006. Muñoz appeared in the film The Borgia (2006) and the horror film Intrusos en Manasés (2008). From 2007 to 2008, Muñoz acted in the title role of Úlises in the series El síndrome de Úlises.

In 2010, Muñoz played his first high-profile English-speaking role as Antegua in the miniseries Ben Hur. In 2011, he was Toti Blanco in the series Vida loca. The following year, he joined the third season of Capadocia, playing the character Hector Bolaños.

In late 2014 Muñoz made it to fourth place as a contestant on the fifth season of the series Danse avec les Stars, in France. He finished in fourth place with his partner, Fauve Hautot.

== Personal life ==
From 2018 to 2020, Muñoz was in a relationship with Ana Guerra.

== Filmography ==
Year	Title	Role	Director	Notes
1994	La vida siempre es corta		Miguel Albaladejo	Short
1995	El Palomo cojo	Felipe	Jaime de Armiñán	
1997	Mamá quiere ser artista	Junior	Ángel Fernández Montesinos	TV series (6 episodes)
1997–98	Al salir de clase	Javi Castro	Pepa Sánchez Biezma, Toni Sevilla, ...	TV series (77 episodes)
1999	Condenadas a entenderse	Lurri	Norberto López Amado	TV series (1 episode)
2000	¡Ala... Dina!	Repartidor de pizzas	José Pavón	TV series (1 episode)
2000	Policías, en el corazón de la calle	Raúl	César Rodríguez Blanco	TV series (1 episode)
2000–02	Compañeros	Charlie	José Ramón Ayerra, Manuel Ríos San Martín, ...	TV series (16 episodes)
2001	Gente pez	Chaval buzón	Jorge Iglesias	
2001	Periodistas	Policía	Antonio Conesa	TV series (2 episodes)
2002	Hospital Central	Alfonso Trece	Javier Pizarro	TV series (1 episode)
2002–05	Un Paso Adelante	Rober Arenales	Jesús del Cerro, Juanma R. Pachón, ...	TV series (84 episodes); TP de Oro - Best Young Talent Actor
2005	Desde que amanece apetece	Máquina	Antonio del Real	
2005–06	Mis adorables vecinos	Juan Castillo	Gustavo Cotta, Sandra Gallego, ...	TV series (19 episodes)
2006	The Borgia	Ramón	Antonio Hernández	
2006	Probabilidades		Ricardo Bajo Gaviño	Short
2007	Ekipo Ja	Himself	Juan Muñoz	
2007	Aída	Julián	Jacobo Martos	TV series (1 episode)
2007–08	El síndrome de Ulises	Ulises Gaytán de Arzuaga	Inma Torrente, Álvaro Fernández Armero, ...	TV series (26 episodes)
2008	Intrusos en Manasés	Ruben	Juan Carlos Claver	
2008	Trío de ases		Joseba Vázquez	
2008	Cazadores de hombres	Hugo Vidal	Álvaro Fernández Armero	TV series (1 episode)
2009–2018	Amar en tiempos revueltos	Alonso Núñez de Losada / Julián Maldonado	Eduardo Casanova, Joan Noguera, ...	TV series (23 episodes)
2010	Lope	Tomás de Perrenot	Andrucha Waddington	
2010	No controles	Ernesto	Borja Cobeaga	
2010	Tensión sexual no resuelta	Nardo	Miguel Ángel Lamata	
2010	Adiós papá, adiós mamá	Martín	Luis Soravilla	Short
2010	Ben Hur	Antegua	Steve Shill	TV mini-series
2010	La piel azul	Germán	Gonzalo López-Gallego	TV mini-series
2010	Gavilanes	Ángel	E.C. Lletget	TV series (1 episode)
2011	Vida loca	Toti Blanco	Manuel Sanabria, Rodrigo Sorogoyen, ...	TV series (20 episodes)
2012	Capadocia	Héctor Bolaños	Pedro Pablo Ibarra, Javier 'Fox' Patrón, ...	TV series (13 episodes)
2012	Infames	Joaquín Navarro / José María "Chema" Barajas	Moisés Ortiz Urquidi	TV series (39 episodes)
2013	Viral	Frank	Lucas Figueroa	
2013	Al final todos mueren	Pablo	David Galán Galindo, Roberto Pérez Toledo, ...	
2013	Hay dos clases de personas	He	Eva Moreno & Juan Carlos Vellido	Short
2014	ABCs of Death 2	Man	Alejandro Brugués	
2014–15	Sin identidad	Bruno Vergel	Kiko Ruiz, Joan Noguera, ...	TV series (23 episodes)
2015	Hablar	El Adicto al Porno	Joaquín Oristrell	
2016	Amar en tiempos revueltos	Alonso Núñez de Losada	Eduardo Casanova	TV series (1 episode)
2017	Proyecto tiempo	Hugo	Isabel Coixet	
2017	El ministerio del tiempo	Gonzalo Guerrero	Koldo Serra	TV series (1 episode)
2017	Bones of Contention	Narrator	Andrea Weiss	Documentary
2018	Presunto culpable	Jon Aristegui	Alejandro Bazzano, Menna Fité, ...	TV series (13 episodes)
2019	El crack cero	Moro	José Luis Garci	Post-Production
2020	What About Love	Christian Santiago	Klaus Menzel	Post-Production
2022	Daddy Daughter Trip	Santiago Arachavaleta	Rob Schneider	

== Stage credits ==
Title	Year	Role	Production
La Cenerentola	1996	Servant	Teatro de la Zarzuela
Bastien und Bastienne	2003	Bastien	Teatro Alcázar
Quickly	2003	Miguel	Teatro Real de Madrid
Il Postino	2005	Pablo Neruda	(2005–06) Teatro Real de Madrid and Spanish tour
Order of the Empty Tomb	2009	Unknown	Colegiata Santa María la Mayor de Antequera

== Discography ==
=== Studio albums with UPA Dance ===
Year	Album	Charts		Certification	Sales
Year	Album	ESP	FRA	Certification	Sales
2002	UPA Dance	1	1	7×Platinum	World: 900,000+ ESP: 700,000+ FRA: 200,000+
2003	UPA Dance Edición Especial	5	—	ESP: Platinum	ESP: 100,000+
2004	UPA Live	1	—	ESP: Platinum	ESP: 100,000+
2005	Contigo	4	—	ESP: Gold	ESP: 50,000+

=== Solo studio albums ===
Year	Album	Charts			Certification	Sales
Year	Album	FRA	ITA	SUI	Certification	Sales
2006	M.A.M.: Released: 4 September 2006; Label: M6 Interactions/Sony BMG; Formats: CD, digital download	13	14	67	FRA: Silver; ITA: Gold	World: 250.000+

=== Solo singles ===
Year	Single	Charts						Album
Year	Single	ESP	FRA	ITA	BEL	SUI	BRA	Album
2006	"Dirás que estoy loco"	1	3	2	16	17	—	M.A.M.
2006	"Esa morena"	—	29	—	—	—	—	M.A.M.
2006	"Vivo para tí"	—	—	—	—	—	2	M.A.M.

== Master Chef Celebrity ==
In 2016 Muñoz won the first Master Chef Celebrity of Spain. He chose charity Fundación Pequeño Deseo as the recipient of his €75,000 prize.
