= Mis adorables vecinos =

- Genre: Comedy
- Created by: Manuel Ríos San Martín; César Vidal Gil; Pablo Barrera; Nacho Cabana; Chus Vallejo
- Written by: Manuel Ríos San Martín; Pablo Barrera; César Vidal Gil; Chus Vallejo; Nacho Cabana; Guillermo Fernández Groizard; Pilar Nadal; Ernesto Pozuelo; Clara Pérez Escrivá; Rodrigo Martín; Benjamín Herranz; Guillermo Cisneros; Rocío Martínez Llano; Gema Muñoz; Nuria Domínguez; Piedad Sancristóval; Juan Carlos Blázquez; Beatriz Duque; María José García Mochales; Catalina Murillo; Nuria Bueno; Nicolás Romero; Mónica Martín-Grande; Manuel Valdivia; Txemi Parra; Sandra Gallego; Caridad Fernández; César Rodríguez Blanco; Juan Carlos Cueto; José Luis Martín; Carmen Montesa; Pedro García; Julia Montejo; Ángela Obón
- Directed by: Guillermo Fernández Groizard; Pablo Barrera
- Starring: Paz Padilla; Miriam Díaz Aroca; Nuria Gago; Yaiza Esteve; Tina Sáinz; Mariola Fuentes; Miki Nadal; María Luisa Merlo; Carlos Baute; Francis Lorenzo; Juanjo Cucalón; Alberto Amarilla; Ariadna Castellano; Isabel Osca; Erika Sanz; María San Juan; Cristian Brunet; Azzdine Bennaji; Celine Tyll; Daniela Costa; Pilar Sánchez; Pedro G. Marzo; Pablo Vega; Javier Ríos
- Country of origin: Spain
- Original language: Spanish
- No. of seasons: 4
- No. of episodes: 62

Production
- Executive producers: Manuel Ríos San Martín; Nacho Cabana; Chus Vallejo; Guillermo Fernández Groizard; Manuel Valdivia
- Cinematography
- Running time: 80 minutes (approx.)
- Production company: Globomedia

Original release
- Network: Antena 3
- Release: 11 April 2004 – 21 May 2006

Mis adorables vecinos (lit. 'My lovely neighbours') is a Spanish comedy television series produced by Globomedia for Antena 3 that was originally broadcast from 11 April 2004 to 21 May 2006. It revolves around the life of a Spanish family who moves to a wealthier neighbourhood and their relationship with their new neighbours.

== Synopsis ==
The Sánchez family are a neighborhood family who, thanks to their daughter Sheila's success as a singer, move to live in a villa in a luxury development. There they meet their neighbors, the Sandoval family. The differences in personalities and upbringings between the two families lead them into a variety of situations.

== Cast ==
=== Sánchez family ===
The Sánchez family comes from Usera, a district of Madrid, where Mariano worked as a greengrocer and Dolores was a hairdresser. When their daughter Sheila wins a television contest and attained worldwide fame, they move to a new luxury development in the outskirts of the city. The adults in the family frequently lie to each other, and usually end up finding out. The children are always having a fun time.

- Mariano Sánchez (Juanjo Cucalón) – a greengrocer until his daughter made him a millionaire. Sometimes, he questions whether he prefers to be rich or poor. He is characterized by his mustache and fanny pack. He doesn't know how to lie and ends up hurting Loli, his wife, on many occasions. He is friendly with his neighborhood friends.
- Dolores "Loli" Mingo (Paz Padilla) – a hairdresser who is very spontaneous. She loves being wealthy, and brags to her old friends, saying that the barbershop she has opened is a beauty salon, although it is still only a neighborhood barbershop.
- Rafael "Rafa" Sánchez Mingo (Alberto Amarilla) – the oldest son of Mariano and Loli. He is handsome, smart, and very lazy. Despite himself, he comes to feel great interest in his new neighbor, Laura, the eldest daughter of the Sandovals.
- Sheila María Sánchez Mingo (Yaiza Esteve) – the middle child and the only daughter of Mariano and Loli. She is ten years old. She is optimistic, cheerful, somewhat mischievous, and enjoys living adventures. She has just known world fame and success, although she is not very aware of it.
- José Miguel "Pepe" Sánchez Mingo (Azzdine Benaji) – the youngest son of Mariano and Loli. He is nine years old. He feels incapable of breaking any rules that adults impose on him, which makes him the ideal target for the jokes of his peers.
- Teresa de Bromujo (Tina Sainz) – the new assistant of the Sánchez family. She tries to teach the family about the rules and etiquette of the wealthy. She considers the family to be somewhat ordinary and wishes to serve in a family that is not newly rich.
- Críspula (Isabel Osca) – Loli's mother, left the town to settle with her daughter in her new house. She doesn't like her family, especially her son-in-law Mariano, whom she considers henpecked and lazy. She also doesn't like the neighbors, and is almost always criticizing what is going on around her.

=== Sandoval family ===
A wealthy family who lives quietly and without problems in a luxury development, until the Sánchez family, their new neighbors, arrive. Like the Sánchez, the adults of the Sandoval family always lie to each other; and their children try to amuse themselves by making mischief.

- Ernesto Sandoval (Francis Lorenzo) – a doctor specializing in cosmetic surgery. He is very presumptuous and believes himself to be much classier than his neighbors, the Sánchez. At first, he can't stand his new neighbor, Mariano, but little by little they become friends.
- Claudia Valladares Roig (Miriam Díaz-Aroca) – a journalist who works for a prestigious magazine. She is passionate about art and history, and tries to make everything around her perfect. She quickly befriends her nice neighbor, Loli, who takes advantage of her to meet famous and important people.
- Laura Sandoval Valladares (Nuria Gago) – the oldest daughter of Ernesto and Claudia. She is a romantic and non-conformist young woman, who constantly analyzes everything around her and has an obsession with seeking certainty. She comes to feel great interest in her new neighbor, Rafa, the eldest son of the Sánchez family.
- Beatriz Sandoval Valladares (Ariadna Castellano) – the youngest daughter of Ernesto and Claudia, and Sergio's twin sister. She considers herself the "ideal of death", and her favorite words are: "success, money, and fame". She cannot be separated from her new neighbor, Sheila, since she is famous, although she is publicly ashamed of her for her continued lack of class.
- Sergio Sandoval Valladares (Christian Brunet) – the youngest son of Ernesto and Claudia, and the twin brother of Beatriz. He knows how to take care of forms and show himself to others as a polite child, although deep down he is a whirlwind capable of organizing all kinds of pranks. He always manages to look innocent, and makes his new neighbor, Pepe, look guilty.
- Ivana (Celine Tyll) – the assistant of the Sandoval family. She is a young and pretty girl from Russia, who works for the family although her profession is a biologist.

=== Recurring cast ===
- Federico Sandoval (Carlos Larrañaga) – the ex-husband of Carmen. He is the father of Ernesto and David; the paternal grandfather of Laura, Beatriz, Sergio, and Antonio; and the father-in-law of Claudia. (season 2)
- Joaquina "Cuqui" López (Mariola Fuentes) – Loli's best friend. She opens a barbershop with Loli called LOCUMA. (seasons 3–4)
- Juan Castillo (Miguel Ángel Muñoz) – Charlie's old friend, who pretends to be married to Romeo. He studies to be a police officer. (season 4)
- Romeo Cienfuegos (Carlos Baute) – Loli burns down his house, runs him over, and he has to move to the Sánchez house. He has to pretend to be married to Juan. (season 4)
- Carmen "Carmela" (María Luisa Merlo) – the ex-wife of Federico. She is the mother of Ernesto and David; the paternal grandmother of Laura, Beatriz, Sergio, and Antonio; and the mother-in-law of Claudia. (seasons 1–4)
- Inocencio (Miki Nadal) – a friend of Mariano and Ernesto. He dated Cuqui. (seasons 3–4)
- Cayetano (Manuel Bandera) – Loli's cousin. (season 4)
- Yessi (Nathalie Seseña) – she is married to a truck driver, but is Inocencio's lover. (season 4)
- Curro Sánchez (Idilio Cardoso) – the father of Mariano; the paternal grandfather of Rafa, Sheila, and Pepe; and the father-in-law of Loli. (season 2)
- David Sandoval (Pedro Mari Sánchez) – the son of Federico and Carmela; the brother of Ernesto; the paternal uncle of Laura, Beatriz, Sergio, and Antonio; and the brother-in-law of Claudia. (season 1)
- Pedro "Ponchó" Moreno (Darío Frías) – a friend of Laura, Aitana, Rubén, and Rafa. He is innocent and a good person. (seasons 1–4)
- Aitana Sagalés de Somontano (Daniela Costa) – Laura's best friend, and a friend of Ponchó, Rafa, and Rubén. Extremely posh. (seasons 1–4)
- Christian Sotomonte Ruiz de Castro (Javier Ríos) – Laura's ex-boyfriend. (season 2)
- Petri (Pilar Sánchez) – a neighborhood friend of the Sánchez family who is somewhat ordinary. She was married to Angelito, a friend of Mariano. Her daughter Vanessa has been involved with Rafa. The Sandovals have problems with her and are forced to hire her as an assistant. She rivals Ivana, whom she wants to kick out of the Sandoval house. (seasons 1–2)
- Angie (Erika Sanz) – the cousin of Rafa, Sheila, and Pepe. (seasons 3–4)
- Rubén (Kike Guaza) – a friend of Laura, Ponchó, Aitana, and Rafa. (season 1)
- Violeta (María San Juan) – Ernesto's goddaughter who spends time living with the Sandoval family. (season 4)
- Vanessa (Vanessa De Frutos) – the daughter of Angelito and Petri. (seasons 1–2)
- Yiyi (Alberto Ferreiro) – Rafa's neighborhood friend. (seasons 1–2)
- Gabi (Enrique Berrendero) – Rafa's neighborhood friend. (seasons 1–2)

=== Cameos ===
- Alonso Caparrós
- Chenoa
- Miguel Ángel Silvestre
- Carlos Sobera
- Lucía Hoyos
- Jaydy Michel
- Javivi
- Patricia Conde
- Pablo Penedo
- Las Virtudes

== Adaptations ==
Mis adorables vecinos was adapted in Greek as Latremenoi Mou Geitones (Greek: Λατρεμένοι μου Γείτονες) by Studio ATA and broadcast on Mega Channel starting in 2007 with additional episodes in 2008.
