= Daddy Daughter Trip =

2022 comedy film

- Official release poster
- Directed by: Rob Schneider
- Screenplay by: Jamie Lissow; Patricia Maya Schneider
- Produced by: Rob Schneider; Patricia Schneider
- Starring: Rob Schneider; Mónica Huarte; Miguel Ángel Muñoz; Jackie Sandler; John Cleese; Miranda Schneider; Gavin Guerrero
- Cinematography: Massimo Zeri
- Edited by: Paul Buhl
- Music by: John Hunter
- Production companies: Mandalm Pictures; A Pinch & Twist
- Distributed by: Mill Creek Entertainment
- Release dates: September 27, 2022 (Scottsdale, Arizona); February 3, 2023 (Mexico); September 30, 2023 (United States)
- Running time: 100 minutes
- Country: United States
- Language: English
- Box office: $301,859

Daddy Daughter Trip is a 2022 American comedy film directed by and starring Rob Schneider and written by Jamie Lissow and Patricia Maya Schneider. The rest of the cast consists of Mónica Huarte, Miguel Ángel Muñoz, Jackie Sandler, John Cleese, and introducing Miranda Schneider and Gavin Guerrero in their film debuts.

== Plot ==
A man (Rob Schneider) takes his daughter (Miranda Schneider) on a Spring break road trip as they have various misadventures along the way.

== Cast ==
- Rob Schneider as Larry Buble
- Jackie Sandler as Megan Buble
- Mónica Huarte as Fernanda Arechavaleta
- Miguel Ángel Muñoz as Santiago Arachavaleta
- Dana Mini Goodman as Karen
- Miranda Scarlet Schneider as Meara Buble
- Gavin Guerrero as Theo
- John Cleese as Frank
- Patricia Maya Schneider as Jeanine
- Michael Bublé as himself
- Madeline Schneider as Madeline
- Elle King as Female Farmer

== Production ==
The film was shot in Arizona. It was announced in July 2021 that filming wrapped.

== Release ==
The film had its world premiere at Camelview at Fashion Square in Scottsdale, Arizona on September 27, 2022. The film was released on February 3, 2023, in Mexico. before its release on home media on December 5, 2023, by Mill Creek Entertainment.

=== Box office ===
As of October 7, 2023, Daddy Daughter Trip grossed $301,859, in Mexico.

== Reception ==
Bill Goodykoontz of The Arizona Republic awarded the film one and a half stars and wrote, "Too often the jokes don't land. Neither does the physical comedy. The story doesn't really hold. It's clear that Schneider and his daughter love each other, and this film is a way to express that. But it's a lot to ask of the rest of us to watch it."
