= Rob Schneider =

American actor and comedian (born 1963)

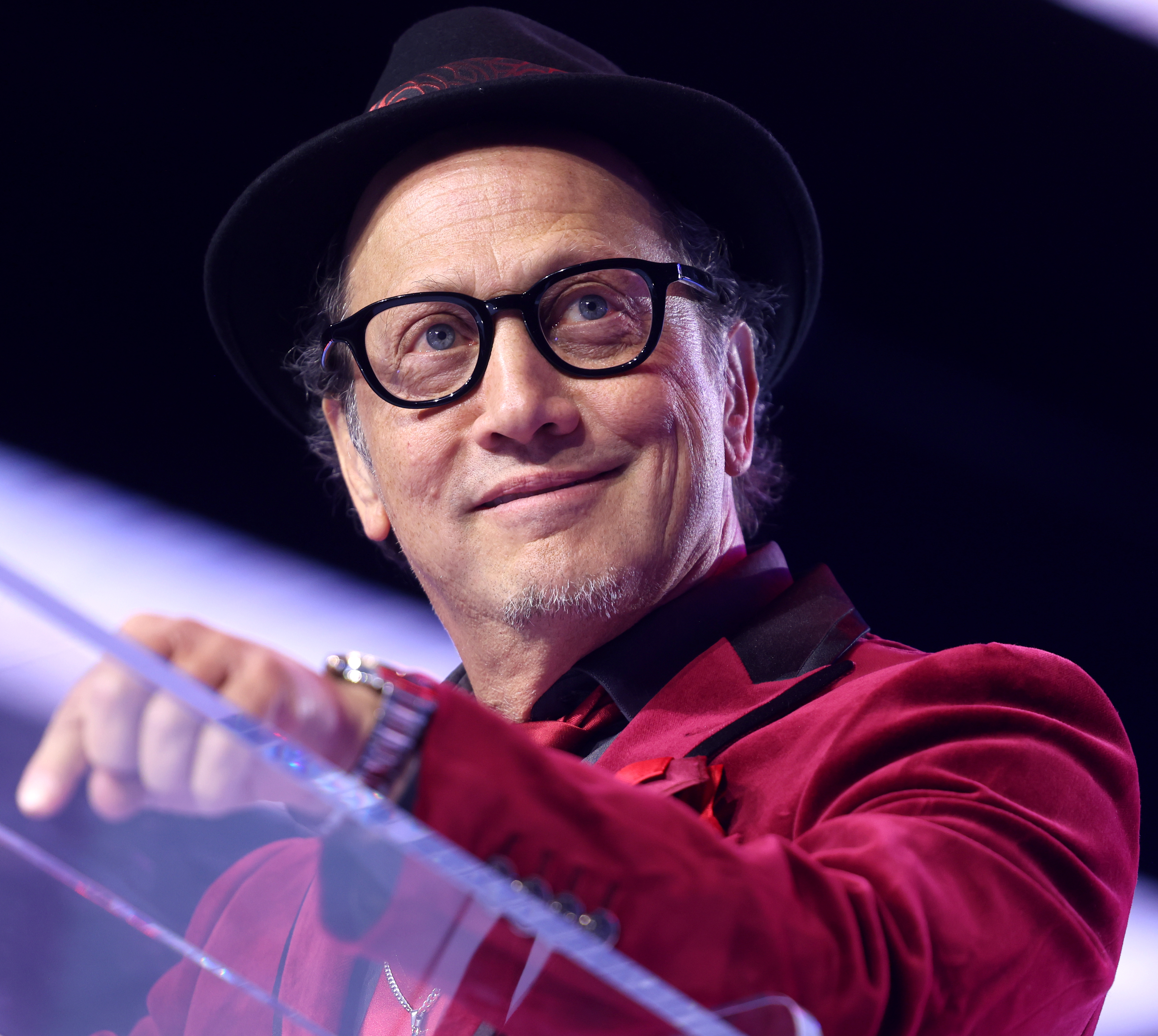
- Schneider in 2025
- Born: Robert Michael Schneider; October 31, 1963 (age 63); San Francisco, California, U.S.
- Occupations: Actor; comedian; screenwriter
- Years active: 1987–present
- Political party: Democratic (1984–2013); Republican (2013–2017); Independent (2017–present)
- Spouses: London King (m. 1988; div. 1990) Helena Schneider (m. 2002; div. 2005) Patricia Azarcoya Arce (m. 2011; sep. 2025)
- Children: 3, including Elle King
- Relatives: John Schneider (brother)
- Website: robschneider.com

Robert Michael Schneider (/ˈʃnaɪdər/ SHNY-dər; born October 31, 1963) is an American actor and comedian. He rose to prominence as a cast member on NBC's comedy series Saturday Night Live (SNL; 1990–1994), where he earned three Primetime Emmy Award nominations.

Following his time on SNL, Schneider transitioned to film, starring in several popular comedies, including Down Periscope (1996), Big Daddy (1999), The Animal (2001), The Hot Chick (2002), and Grown Ups (2010). His best known starring role is as Deuce Bigalow in Deuce Bigalow: Male Gigolo (1999) and its sequel Deuce Bigalow: European Gigolo (2005).

Schneider has also made guest appearances on numerous television shows and has pursued stand-up comedy throughout his career. He is the father of singer Elle King.

== Early life and education ==
Robert Michael Schneider was born in San Francisco, California, on October 31, 1963, and grew up in the nearby suburb of Pacifica. His parents were Pilar (née Monroe), a former kindergarten teacher and ex-school board president, and Marvin Schneider, a real estate broker. His father was Jewish and his mother was Catholic. Schneider's maternal grandmother was a Filipina who met and married his grandfather, a white American army private, while he was stationed in the Philippines. His mixed background has been a common theme throughout his career.

Schneider graduated from Terra Nova High School in 1982 and then attended San Francisco State University. His older brother, John, is a producer.

== Career ==
=== Early career ===
Schneider began his career doing stand-up comedy in San Francisco. He made his debut appearance on television in 1987, on HBO's 13th Annual Young Comedians special, which was hosted by comedian Dennis Miller.

=== Saturday Night Live ===
After being hired as a writer for the NBC sketch comedy series Saturday Night Live in 1988, Schneider was part of the show's comedy team from 1990 to 1994. He played such roles as "Tiny Elvis", "Orgasm Guy", and Richard Laymer, the office worker beside the photocopier who addressed each of his fellow employees with an endless stream of annoying gossip. Schneider is featured in the video release The Bad Boys of Saturday Night Live, along with colleagues Adam Sandler, Chris Rock, David Spade, and Chris Farley.

==== Recurring SNL characters ====
- The Richmeister, an office worker who annoys people by giving them nicknames as they make copies.
- Carlo, from the Il Cantore Restaurant sketches
- The Sensitive Naked Man, a nude man who gives advice to other characters

=== Feature films, sitcoms, and endorsements ===
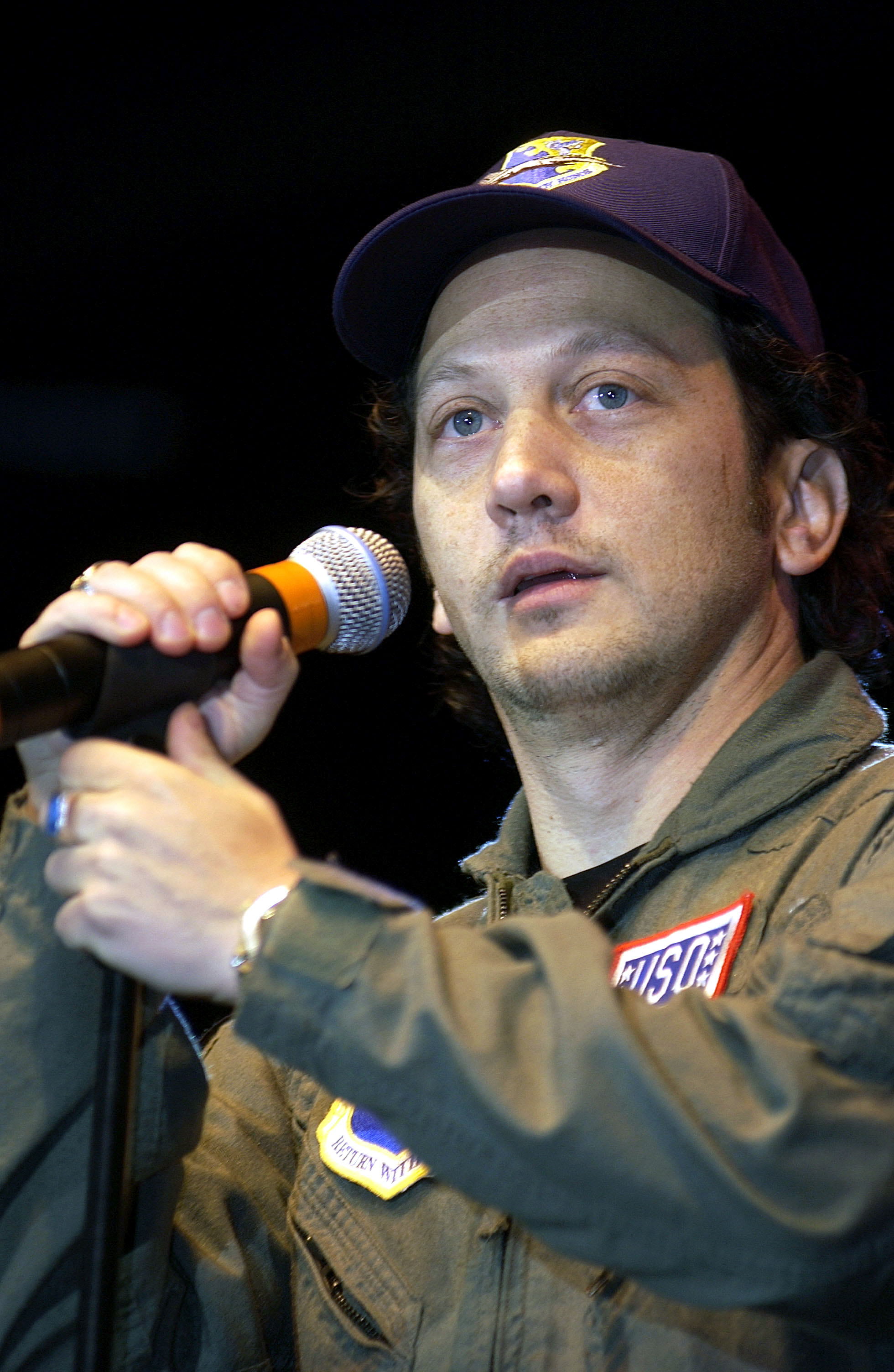
Schneider in November 2001

During and after leaving SNL, Schneider played supporting roles in a series of films including Home Alone 2: Lost in New York (1992), Surf Ninjas (1993), Demolition Man (1993), The Beverly Hillbillies (1993), Judge Dredd (1995), and Down Periscope (1996). He also appeared in a recurring part on the television series Coach. In 1996, he co-starred in the NBC sitcom Men Behaving Badly, an American take on the hit British series of the same name. The American version ran for two seasons.

Schneider starred in the 1999 feature film Deuce Bigalow: Male Gigolo, a tale of a fish-tank cleaner who incurs a massive debt and is forced to become a "man-whore." This was followed by The Animal (2001), about a man given animal powers by a mad scientist; The Hot Chick (2002), wherein the body of a petty thief named Clive Maxtone (played by Schneider) is mystically switched with the body of a pretty, but mean-spirited high school cheerleader named Jessica Spencer (played by Rachel McAdams in her film debut); and the sequel Deuce Bigalow: European Gigolo (2005). The latter movie was not well received by critics or moviegoers, and as a result, Schneider won a 2005 Worst Actor Razzie Award for his role in the film.

In 2006, Schneider co-starred in the baseball-themed family comedy The Benchwarmers, along with his fellow SNL alumnus David Spade as well as Jon Heder. Other film roles include Schneider's appearance with Jim Henson's Muppets in the 1999 film Muppets from Space, and his role as a San Francisco hobo in the 2004 remake of Around the World in 80 Days.

Schneider's directorial debut, the comedy Big Stan, was released in some overseas markets during the fall of 2008, with a U.S. release in early 2009. In the film, he starred as a real estate con artist who is arrested for perpetrating real-estate scams. He is sentenced to prison, so he takes a crash-course in martial arts to survive incarceration.

Schneider has also appeared in numerous comedies starring his SNL comrade Adam Sandler, including The Waterboy (1998), Grown Ups (2010) and Hubie Halloween (2020). The comedic characters Schneider plays in these films include an overly enthusiastic Cajun man who proclaims the catch-phrase, "You can do it!"; an amiable Middle Eastern delivery boy; a prison inmate; and Sandler's one-eyed Hawaiian sidekick, Ula. Schneider has uttered the line "You can do it!" as a running gag in Sandler's films The Waterboy, Little Nicky, 50 First Dates, The Longest Yard, and Bedtime Stories, as well as in a deleted scene from Click (a sample of Schneider saying the phrase also turns up in the song "Original Prankster" by The Offspring). Returning the favor, Sandler appeared in a cameo to spout the same line in Schneider's The Animal. Schneider narrated Sandler's 2002 animated movie Eight Crazy Nights and voiced the part of a Chinese waiter. Schneider also had an uncredited cameo as a Canadian-Japanese wedding-chapel minister in the 2007 Sandler-Kevin James comedy I Now Pronounce You Chuck & Larry and played a Palestinian cab driver who serves as the title character's nemesis in the 2008 Sandler film You Don't Mess with the Zohan.

Schneider played a variety of roles in the 2005 television special Back to Norm, starring another former SNL player Norm Macdonald, and appeared on episodes of the popular television shows Seinfeld and Ally McBeal. Schneider hosted the Sports Illustrated: Swimsuit '97 television special, and the 2005 Teen Choice Awards, and was a frequent guest on NBC's late-night variety program The Tonight Show with Jay Leno. In Schneider's appearance with Leno on the July 24, 2007, episode of The Tonight Show, he showed up in drag as actress Lindsay Lohan after the latter cancelled following an arrest for driving under the influence.

Besides his efforts in movies and television, Schneider released his first comedy album Registered Offender in July 2010. Registered Offender is composed of audio sketches and songs, with Schneider himself doing all of the character voices on the recording. He also revived his stand-up comedy career in 2010 with an international tour of theaters, clubs, and casinos.

Schneider appeared in the music video for country singer Neal McCoy's "Billy's Got His Beer Goggles On", as the song's title character. McCoy and Schneider met while the two went on a USO tour in support of U.S. troops two months after the September 11, 2001 terrorist attacks.

Schneider starred as the title character in the CBS sitcom Rob, which was loosely based on his real life. The series ran for eight episodes starting on January 12, 2012, and was canceled in May. In 2015, he produced, directed and starred in Real Rob, a sitcom that follows his life and includes his real-life wife Patricia and daughter Miranda. Netflix released a season of 8 episodes, and a second season in 2017.

Schneider is the official celebrity spokesperson for the Taiwan Tourism Bureau and the Ten Ren Tea company in Taipei.

Schneider was spokesperson for State Farm Insurance, but was dropped in 2014 due to his anti-vaccination views.

In May 2016, Schneider was featured as a special guest on the Let's Play webseries Game Grumps, alongside his wife Patricia, commentating over Midway's Mortal Kombat Trilogy. They reappeared on the show in November 2017, then commentating over Konami's Contra.

In 2021, Schneider competed on season six of The Masked Singer as the wild card contestant "Hamster". A running joke is that "Hamster" would pantomime urinating on Nick Cannon and get affectionate with him. When unmasked on the fifth week, Schneider dedicated his performance of Luis Miguel's Sabor a Mí to Patricia and his daughters Miranda, Madeline, and Elle. In addition, Schneider did a variation of his Townie character's "You can do it" line by quoting Hamster's final words "You can do it Masked Singer, all night long!"

In 2022, he starred, produced, and directed in Daddy Daughter Trip, which served as his third film as a director and also starred his wife Patricia and daughter Miranda. The film was to be exclusively shown in Harkins Theaters.

=== Stand-up ===
Schneider has performed numerous stand-up comedy shows.

== Personal life ==
In 1988, Schneider eloped to Las Vegas with former model London King, who gave birth to their daughter, musician Elle King, in 1989. The couple divorced in 1990 and he had minimal connection with his daughter as a child, but as an adult the two rekindled a "beautiful and really wonderful, great loving relationship." In 2021, King gave birth to a son, Schneider's first grandchild. In August 2024, King discussed her childhood and her relationship with her father on an episode of Bunnie Xo's podcast Dumb Blonde. She described her relationship with Schneider as an "ebb and flow" and at that point, the two were "not flowing." On growing up with Schneider, she said she would stay summers with him on film sets but that the two rarely spent time together as he was working and that she refused to spend any more summers with him after he decided to send her to weight loss camp. She also mentioned that Schneider would often forget her birthday and that she did not agree with his then-recent comments about women, transgender people, and vaccines. Schneider later issued a public apology to her during an interview with Tucker Carlson, saying he loved her and that he hoped she could forgive him for his shortcomings as a father. In response, King said that her father apologizing on Carlson's show is "like a double negative... means nothing".

In 1996, Schneider established the Rob Schneider Music Foundation. The foundation returned music education to Pacifica's elementary schools by paying the teachers' salaries and providing funds for instruments and other equipment. Prior to Schneider's efforts, the school system had been without music education programs for years. He also once co-owned the DNA Lounge, a San Francisco nightclub.

In 2002, he married former model Helena Schneider but the union was short-lived.

In 2007, Schneider met television producer Patricia Azarcoya Arce. On April 23, 2011, the two married in Beverly Hills, California. They have two daughters, born in 2012 and 2016. The family supports Mexican soccer club Tigres, which is based in Patricia's hometown of Monterrey, Mexico. The family reside in Arizona. Azarcoya filed for divorce from Schneider on December 8, 2025.

In 2023, Schneider converted to Catholicism.

== Political views and stances ==
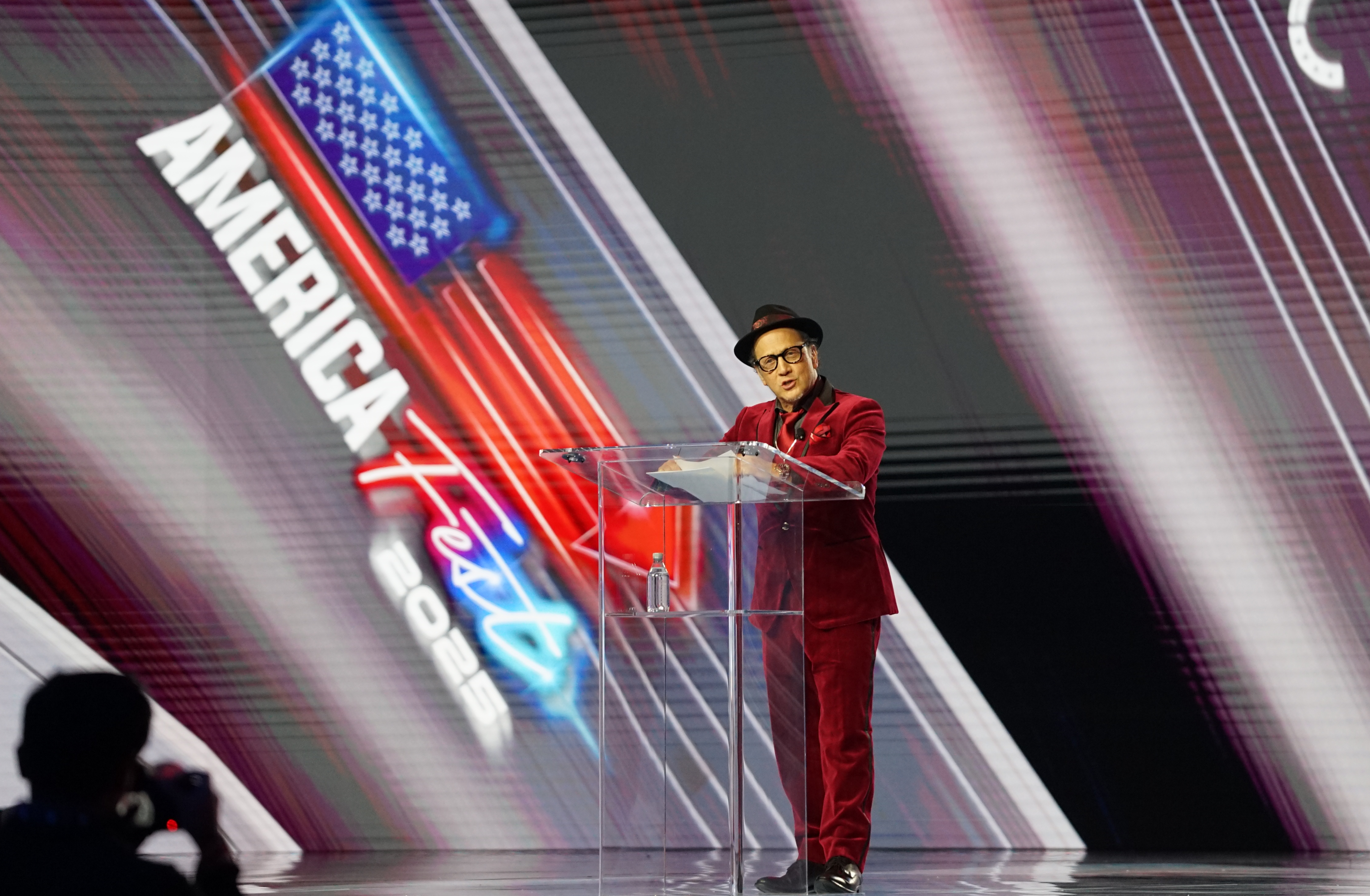
Schneider speaking at AmericaFest in 2025

In 2013, Schneider switched political parties from the Democratic Party to the Republican Party, explaining: "The state of California is a mess, and the super majority of Democrats is not working. I've been a lifelong Democrat and I have to switch over because it no longer serves the people of this great state." He endorsed Republican candidate Tim Donnelly for the 2014 California gubernatorial election.

In an interview on Larry King Now in 2017, Schneider said he was an independent but leaned more conservative.

In July 2023, Schneider endorsed independent candidate Robert F. Kennedy Jr. in the 2024 U.S. presidential election. In August 2024, following the suspension of Kennedy's campaign, he endorsed Republican candidate Donald Trump. He was a headliner at the 2024 Moms for Liberty convention.

In 2026, Schneider made a post calling on the United States to require all Americans to serve in the military for two years upon turning 18, arguing that it would "teach them how great our country is". Brian Linder of Penn Live was among those critical of Schneider, pointing out he never served in the military, and said, "The fact that he spent his time as a young adult acting and doing comedy and not serving in the military, was not lost on his followers, and the response on X was brutal." In May 2026, Schneider endorsed Republican candidate Zach Lahn in the 2026 Iowa gubernatorial election, despite not living in Iowa.

=== Anti-vaccination and health activism ===
Schneider has spread false information about childhood vaccinations. In an interview with News10 in Sacramento, Schneider opined that "The efficacy of these shots have not been proven ... And the toxicity of these things – we're having more and more side effects. We're having more and more autism." He also views the actions from the state of California to mandate vaccinations as government overreach.

In 2015, Schneider actively opposed the passage of two California laws, California Assembly Bill 2109 and California Senate Bill 277, which both made childhood vaccination exemptions harder to obtain. On September 28, 2012, Schneider and California State Assemblyman Tim Donnelly spoke at the "Medical Freedom Rally", where they urged California Governor Jerry Brown to veto Assembly Bill 2109, which would have made it more difficult for parents to use philosophical reasons for exemptions from mandatory childhood vaccinations. While the bill was not vetoed, Governor Brown added a signing message instructing the Department of Health to add a religious exemption and to make sure the process was not overly burdensome to parents.

While fighting California Senate Bill 277, which removed exemptions to mandatory vaccinations due to personal beliefs, Schneider left a phone message to California state Assemblywoman and bill co-author Lorena Gonzalez saying that he would spend money against her in her next re-election. Gonzalez, in an interview with The Washington Times, said that she found the message to be disturbing, but upon calling back, she said, "he was actually much nicer to me, but let's be honest ... that is 20 mins of my life I'll never get back arguing that vaccines don't cause autism with Deuce Bigalow: Male Gigolo."

In October 2025, he tweeted that "there were no Children's Hospitals when I was a kid. Because kids weren't sick." Others responded, pointing out that many such hospitals existed even before his birth, and that the first children's hospital in the United States, the Children’s Hospital of Philadelphia, opened in 1855.

=== Removed from stage ===
There were incidents where Rob Schneider did standup and did something that had to have him removed from the stage.

- In December 2023, Schneider was hired to perform a standup show at an event organized by the Senate Working Group. The performance was scheduled to last 30 minutes, but the show was cancelled after 10 minutes due to offensive content. Attendees were sent letters of apology after the performance.
- In June 2024, Schneider performed in Saskatchewan at a fundraising event for the Hospitals of Regina Foundation (a Canadian medical not-for-profit organization), where he told jokes about vaccines, women, and transgender people. He was removed from the stage in the middle of his set by event organizers, who later apologized for his behaviour. Schneider has defended his jokes, stating "I'm doing it right."

=== Paris Olympics boycott ===
In July 2024, Schneider posted on the social media platform X, "I am sorry to say to ALL the world's GREATEST ATHLETES, I wish you ALL THE BEST, but I cannot watch an Olympics that disrespects Christianity and openly celebrates Satan. I sincerely hope THESE @Olympics get the same amount of viewers as @cspan". This was in reaction to the 2024 Summer Olympics opening ceremony, which was accused of including drag queen performers burlesquing The Last Supper painting.

=== Transgender views ===
In 2023, Schneider made posts on social media criticizing the transgender TikTok influencer Dylan Mulvaney, calling her transgender identity "cultural appropriation".

In August 2024, Schneider was a speaker at the 2024 national summit for the conservative group Moms for Liberty.

In September 2024, Schneider's daughter, Elle King, distanced herself from Schneider and criticized his comments.

== Filmography ==
=== Film ===
Year	Title	Role	Notes
1990	Martians Go Home	Voyeur Martian	
1991	Necessary Roughness	Chuck Neiderman	
1992	Home Alone 2: Lost in New York	Cedric the Bellman	
1993	Surf Ninjas	Iggy	
1993	Demolition Man	Erwin	Uncredited
1993	The Beverly Hillbillies	Woodrow Tyler	
1995	Judge Dredd	Fergee	
1996	Down Periscope	Lt. Martin Pascal	
1996	The Adventures of Pinocchio	Volpe	
1998	Knock Off	Tommy Hendricks	
1998	Susan's Plan	Steve	
1998	The Waterboy	Townie	
1999	Deuce Bigalow: Male Gigolo	Deuce Bigalow	Also writer
1999	Big Daddy	Nazo	
1999	Muppets from Space	TV Producer	
2000	Little Nicky	The Townie	
2001	The Animal	Marvin Mange	Also writer
2002	Mr. Deeds	Nazo, the Italian Delivery Man	Uncredited
2002	Eight Crazy Nights	Chinese Waiter, Narrator	Voice
2002	The Hot Chick	Clive Maxtone/Jessica Spencer	Also writer
2003	The Electric Piper	Rinky Dinky Dink	Voice
2004	50 First Dates	Ula	
2004	Around the World in 80 Days	Hobo	
2005	The Longest Yard	Punky	
2005	Deuce Bigalow: European Gigolo	Deuce Bigalow	Also writer
2006	Grandma's Boy	Yuri	
2006	The Benchwarmers	Gus Matthews	
2006	Click	Prince Habeeboo	Uncredited
2006	Shark Bait	Nerissa, Bart, Conch Shell, Eddie, Indian Crab, Lobster, Lou, Madge the Starfish, Pelican	Voice; English dub
2006	Little Man	Dinosaur Rex	Uncredited
2007	I Now Pronounce You Chuck and Larry	Asian Minister	Uncredited
2007	Big Stan	Stan Minton	Also director and producer
2008	American Crude	Bill	
2008	You Don't Mess with the Zohan	Salim	
2008	Bedtime Stories	Indian Horse Seller / Scammer	Uncredited
2009	Wild Cherry	Father of High School Girl	
2009	American Virgin	Ed Curtzman	
2010	Grown Ups	Rob Hilliard	
2010	The Chosen One	Paul Zadzik	Also director, writer, and producer
2011	You May Not Kiss the Bride	Ernesto	
2011	Top Cat: The Movie	Lou Strickland	Voice; English dub
2012	Noah's Ark: The New Beginning	Zed	Voice
2012	Koala Kid	Johnny the Koala, Narrator, Mac the Kangaroo, Boy #1	Voice; English dub
2012	Wings	Dodo	Voice; English dub
2012	The Reef 2: High Tide	Nerissa, Bart, Bud, Doom, Eddie, Lobster, Madge, Max the Crab, Pelican, Sponge	Voice; English dub
2012	Dino Time	Dodger	Voice; English dub
2013	InAPPropriate Comedy	Psychologist / J. D.	
2013	Pororo, The Racing Adventure	Toto	Voice; English dub
2014	Jungle Shuffle	Chuy, Dr. Loco, Great Monkey, Tuana	Voice
2014	Shelby	Shelby	Voice
2014	Wings: Sky Force Heroes	Fred	Voice; English dub
2015	The Ridiculous 6	Ramon	
2015	The Frog Kingdom	One Eye	Voice; English dub
2015	OMG, I'm a Robot!	Robo Joseph	Voice
2015	Pups United	Benny	Voice
2016	Norm of the North	Norm	Voice
2016	The Adventures of Panda Warrior	Patrick, Jimmy Ginseng	Voice; English dub
2017	Sandy Wexler	Firuz	
2017	Ozzy	Vito	Voice; English dub
2020	The Wrong Missy	Komante	
2020	Hubie Halloween	Richie Hartman	
2021	Pups Alone	Jose	Voice
2022	Home Team	Jamie	
2022	Daddy Daughter Trip	Larry Buble	Also director and producer
2023	Leo	The Principal	Voice
2025	Happy Gilmore 2	Tricycle Cowboy	
TBA	Grown Ups 3	Rob Hilliard	Filming

=== Television ===
Year	Title	Role	Notes
1989	227	Jeremy	Episode: "House Number"
1990	Coach	Leonard Kraleman	2 episodes
1990–1994	Saturday Night Live	Various roles	Main role (seasons 16–19), 80 episodes
1996	Seinfeld	Bob Grossberg	Episode: "The Friar's Club"
1996–1997, 2001	Men Behaving Badly	Jamie Coleman	Main role, 35 episodes
1998	Ally McBeal	Ross Fitzsimmons	Episode: "Happy Trails"
2005	The Andy Milonakis Show	Himself	Episode 1.08
2012	Rob	Rob	Main role, 8 episodes
2013	Inside Amy Schumer	Rich	Episode: "Meth Lab"
2014	Hot in Cleveland	Chill	Episode: "Murder House"
2015–2017	Real Rob	Rob	Main role, 16 episodes, also creator/executive producer
2021	The Masked Singer	Himself/Hamster	Season 6 contestant; eliminated in episode 6
2023	Chip Chilla	Chum Chum Chilla	Main voice role (season 1), 12 episodes

=== Video games ===
Year	Title	Role	Notes
1997	A Fork in the Tale	Delivery guy	
2018	Madden NFL 19	Donnie Marks	Story mode, "Longshot Homecoming"

== Awards and nominations ==
Year	Award	Category	Nominated work	Result
1990	Primetime Emmy Awards	Outstanding Writing in a Variety or Music Program (shared with the other writers)	Saturday Night Live: "Alec Baldwin"	Nominated
1991	Primetime Emmy Awards	Outstanding Writing in a Variety or Music Program (shared with the other writers)	Saturday Night Live: "Roseanne Barr"	Nominated
1992	Primetime Emmy Awards	Outstanding Writing in a Variety or Music Program (shared with the other writers)	Saturday Night Live	Nominated
2000	Blockbuster Entertainment Awards	Favorite Actor – Comedy	Deuce Bigalow: Male Gigolo	Nominated
2000	Golden Raspberry Awards	Worst Supporting Actor	Big Daddy	Nominated
2001	Teen Choice Awards	Choice Movie Wipeout	The Animal	Nominated
2001	Teen Choice Awards	Choice Comedian	Rob Schneider	Nominated
2002	Stinkers Bad Movie Awards	Worst Fake Accent – Male	Eight Crazy Nights	Nominated
2005	Stinkers Bad Movie Awards	Worst Actor	Deuce Bigalow: European Gigolo	Nominated
2006	MTV Movie & TV Awards	Sexiest Performance	Deuce Bigalow: European Gigolo	Nominated
2006	Golden Raspberry Awards	Worst Actor	Deuce Bigalow: European Gigolo	Won
2006	Golden Raspberry Awards	Worst Screen Couple (shared with his diapers)	Deuce Bigalow: European Gigolo	Nominated
2006	Golden Raspberry Awards	Worst Screenplay (shared with David Garrett and Jason Ward)	Deuce Bigalow: European Gigolo	Nominated
2006	Teen Choice Awards	Choice Movie Chemistry (shared with David Spade and Jon Heder)	The Benchwarmers	Nominated
2007	Golden Raspberry Awards	Worst Actor	The Benchwarmers and Little Man	Nominated
2008	Golden Raspberry Awards	Worst Supporting Actor	I Now Pronounce You Chuck & Larry	Nominated
2010	Golden Raspberry Awards	Worst Actor of the Decade	Rob Schneider	Nominated
2011	Golden Raspberry Awards	Worst Supporting Actor	Grown Ups	Nominated
