= Dirás que estoy loco =

Single by Miguel Ángel Muñoz

from the album MAM
- B-side: "Vivo para ti"
- Released: 2004
- Genre: Pop
- Length: 2:50
- Label: Globo / Basic Quest, M6 Interactions (France), Blanco Y Negro (Spain), ARS / EMI (Belgium), Universo (Italy)
- Songwriter(s): J. León, J.C. Ortega

Miguel Ángel Muñoz singles chronology
"Dirás que estoy loco" (2004)	"Esa Morena" (2006)

"Diras que estoy loco" is a 2006 song recorded by Spanish singer and actor Miguel Ángel Muñoz. It was the lead single from his album M.A.M. and was released first in 2004 in Spain, then in June 2006 in other countries. The song was originally performed by the character he performed, Roberto Arenales, in the television series Un Paso Adelante. In 2004, the song was ranked No. 1 in Spain for eleven consecutive weeks, with over 180,000 units sold. It was released two years later and achieved success in Italy, reaching #2 on the charts, and France, where it peaked at #3. The 2006 release was supported by a new version of the music video.

== Track listings ==
CD single

No.	Title	Length
1.	"Dirás que estoy loco"	2:50
2.	"Vivo para ti"	3:12

Digital download

No.	Title	Length
1.	"Dirás que estoy loco"	2:50

== Credits ==
General

- Lyrics and music : J. Léon and J.C. Ortega
- Artistic direction : Miguel Angel Muñoz
- Photo : Bernardo Doral
- Assistant photo : Alberto Gallego
- Artwork : Crazybaby!
- Producer : Hitvisión

"Vivo para ti"

- Lyrics and music : Marc Martin
- Guitar : Jean-Paul Depeyron
- Arranger : M. Martin and Santi Maspons
- Producer : Francesc Pellicer

== Release history ==
Date	Region
2004	Spain
June 2006	France, Belgium (Wallonia), Switzerland
January 2007	Italy

== Charts ==
Chart (2004/05)	Peak position
Spanish Singles Chart ^{1}	1
Chart (2006)	Peak position
Belgian (Wallonia) Singles Chart	16
French SNEP Singles Chart	3
Swiss Singles Chart	17
Chart (2007)	Peak position
Italian FIMI Singles Chart	2

^{1} The Spanish Singles Chart archives provide by Spanishcharts are not available before 2005.

End of year chart (2006)	Position
Belgian (Wallonia) Singles Chart	76
French Singles Chart	23

== Certifications and sales ==
Certifications for "Dirás que estoy loco"
Region	Certification	Certified units/sales
France (SNEP)	Gold	200,000^{*}
^{*} Sales figures based on certification alone.
