= 15th Tony Awards =

1961 US theatrical awards ceremony

- Date: April 16, 1961
- Location: Waldorf-Astoria; New York City, New York
- Hosted by: Phil Silvers
- Most wins: Becket, Bye Bye Birdie, and Camelot (4)
- Most nominations: Bye Bye Birdie (8)

Television/radio coverage
- Network: WCBS-TV

The 15th Annual Tony Awards took place on April 16, 1961, in the Waldorf-Astoria Grand Ballroom in New York City. The ceremony was broadcast on local television station WCBS-TV (Channel 2) in New York City. The Master of Ceremonies was Phil Silvers.

== Eligibility ==
Shows that opened on Broadway during the 1960 season before March 18, 1961 are eligible.

Original plays

- Advise and Consent
- All the Way Home
- Becket
- Big Fish, Little Fish
- Come Blow Your Horn
- Critic's Choice
- The Devil's Advocate
- Duel of Angels
- Face of a Hero
- Farewell, Farewell, Eugene
- The 49th Cousin
- The Hostage
- How to Make a Man
- Invitation to a March
- The Importance of Being Oscar
- Julia, Jake and Uncle Joe
- Laughs and Other Events
- Little Moon of Alban
- Love and Libel
- Mary, Mary
- Midgie Purvis
- Once There Was a Russian
- Period of Adjustment
- Rape of the Belt
- Rhinoceros
- A Second String
- Send Me No Flowers
- A Taste of Honey
- Under the Yum-Yum Tree
- Viva Madison Avenue!
- The Wall
- The World of Carl Sandburg

Original musicals

- Bye Bye Birdie
- Camelot
- Christine
- The Conquering Hero
- Do Re Mi
- From A to Z
- Irma La Douce
- Show Girl
- Tenderloin
- 13 Daughters
- The Unsinkable Molly Brown
- Vintage '60
- Wildcat

Play revivals

- Henry IV, Part 2
- The Octoroon
- The Plough and the Stars
- She Stoops to Conquer

Musical revivals

- Finian's Rainbow
- H.M.S. Pinafore

== The Ceremony ==
Presenters: Anna Maria Alberghetti, Anne Bancroft, Ray Bolger, Carol Channing, Henry Fonda, Joan Fontaine, Robert Goulet, Helen Hayes, Celeste Holm, Fredric March, Mary Martin, Helen Menken, Patricia Neal, Paul Newman, Geraldine Page, Sidney Poitier, Robert Preston, Jason Robards, Gig Young, Shirley Booth

The performer was Eleanor Steber.

Music was by Meyer Davis and his Orchestra.

== Winners and nominees ==
Winners are in bold

Best Play	Best Musical
**Becket – Jean Anouilh**; All the Way Home – Tad Mosel; The Devil's Advocate – Dore Schary; The Hostage – Brendan Behan	**Bye Bye Birdie**; Do Re Mi; Irma La Douce
Best Performance by a Leading Actor in a Play	Best Performance by a Leading Actress in a Play
**Zero Mostel – Rhinoceros as John**; Hume Cronyn – Big Fish, Little Fish as Jimmie Luton; Sam Levene – The Devil's Advocate as Dr. Aldo Meyer; Anthony Quinn – Becket as Henry II	**Joan Plowright – A Taste of Honey as Josephine**; Tallulah Bankhead – Midgie Purvis as Midgie Purvis; Barbara Baxley – Period of Adjustment as Isabel Haverstick; Barbara Bel Geddes – Mary, Mary as Mary McKellaway
Best Performance by a Leading Actor in a Musical	Best Performance by a Leading Actress in a Musical
**Richard Burton – Camelot as Arthur**; Phil Silvers – Do Re Mi as Hubert Cram; Maurice Evans – Tenderloin as Reverend Brock	**Elizabeth Seal – Irma La Douce as Irma La Douce**; Julie Andrews – Camelot as Guenevere; Carol Channing – Show Girl as Various Characters; Nancy Walker – Do Re Mi as Kay Cram
Best Performance by a Supporting or Featured Actor in a Play	Best Performance by a Supporting or Featured Actress in a Play
**Martin Gabel – Big Fish, Little Fish as Basil Smythe**; Philip Bosco – Rape of the Belt as Heracles; Eduardo Ciannelli – The Devil's Advocate as Aurelio; George Grizzard – Big Fish, Little Fish as Ronnie Johnson	**Colleen Dewhurst – All the Way Home as Mary Follet**; Eileen Heckart – Invitation to a March as Deedee Grogan; Tresa Hughes – The Devil's Advocate as Nina Sanduzzi; Rosemary Murphy – Period of Adjustment as Dorothea Bates
Best Performance by a Supporting or Featured Actor in a Musical	Best Performance by a Supporting or Featured Actress in a Musical
**Dick Van Dyke – Bye Bye Birdie as Albert Peterson**; Clive Revill – Irma La Douce as Bob-Le-Hotu; Dick Gautier – Bye Bye Birdie as Conrad Birdie; Ron Husmann – Tenderloin as Tommy	**Tammy Grimes – The Unsinkable Molly Brown as Molly Tobin**; Nancy Dussault – Do Re Mi as Tilda Mullen; Chita Rivera – Bye Bye Birdie as Rosie Alvarez
Best Direction of a Play	Best Direction of a Musical
**John Gielgud – Big Fish, Little Fish**; Joseph Anthony – Rhinoceros; Joan Littlewood – The Hostage; Arthur Penn – All the Way Home	**Gower Champion – Bye Bye Birdie**; Peter Brook – Irma La Douce; Garson Kanin – Do Re Mi
Best Choreography	Best Conductor and Musical Director
**Gower Champion – Bye Bye Birdie**; Onna White – Irma La Douce	**Franz Allers – Camelot**; Pembrode Davenport – 13 Daughters; Stanley Lebowsky – Irma La Douce; Elliot Lawrence – Bye Bye Birdie
Best Scenic Design in a Play	Best Scenic Design in a Musical
**Oliver Smith – Becket**; Roger Furse – Duel of Angels; David Hays – All the Way Home; Jo Mielziner – The Devil's Advocate; Rouben Ter-Arutunian – Advise and Consent	**Oliver Smith – Camelot**; George C. Jenkins – 13 Daughters; Robert Randolph – Bye Bye Birdie
Best Costume Design in a Play	Best Costume Design in a Musical
**Motley – Becket**; Theoni V. Aldredge – The Devil's Advocate; Raymond Sovey – All the Way Home	**Adrian and Tony Duquette – Camelot**; Rolf Gerard – Irma La Douce; Cecil Beaton – Tenderloin
Best Stage Technician
**Teddy Van Bemmel – Becket**

== Special awards ==
- David Merrick, in recognition of a fabulous production record over the last seven years.
- Theatre Guild, for organizing the first repertory to go abroad for the State Department.

=== Multiple nominations and awards ===
These productions had multiple nominations:

- 8 nominations: Bye Bye Birdie
- 7 nominations: Irma La Douce
- 6 nominations: The Devil's Advocate
- 5 nominations: All the Way Home, Becket, Camelot and Do Re Mi
- 4 nominations: Big Fish, Little Fish
- 3 nominations: Tenderloin
- 2 nominations: The Hostage, Period of Adjustment, Rhinocéros and 13 Daughters

The following productions received multiple awards.

- 4 wins: Becket, Bye Bye Birdie and Camelot
- 2 wins: Big Fish, Little Fish

== See also ==
- 33rd Academy Awards
