= Midgie =

Midgie may refer to:

- Highland midge, a species of small flying insect also known as a midgie in the Scots language
- The Midgie, a magazine aimed at independent travellers from the publishers of The List
- Midgie Purvis, a play by playwright Mary Chase
