= Saul Swimmer =

American film director (1936–2007)

- Swimmer in MobileVision promotional image
- Born: April 25, 1936; Uniontown, Pennsylvania
- Died: March 3, 2007 (aged 70); Miami, Florida
- Occupations: Documentarian, director, producer
- Known for: The Concert for Bangladesh; The Boy Who Owned a Melephant

Saul Swimmer (April 25, 1936 – March 3, 2007) was an American documentary film director and producer best known for the movie The Concert for Bangladesh (1972), the George Harrison-led Madison Square Garden show that was one of the first all-star benefits in rock music. He was also a co-producer of The Beatles' 1970 documentary Let It Be.

== Biography ==
=== Early life and career ===
Born to a Uniontown, Pennsylvania, family that included a sister, Esther, and three brothers, Wolford and Alvin, and Herbert, Swimmer earned a bachelor's degree from Carnegie Mellon University in nearby Pittsburgh. He began directing in his early twenties, gaining attention for his half-hour children's short The Boy Who Owned a Melephant (1959), narrated by actress Tallulah Bankhead and produced with Peter Gayle and Tony Anthony, who would become his frequent collaborators. Swimmer's biography at his company's website states the film won a Gold Leaf award at the Venice Film Festival, a claim that subsequently appears in many accounts, but that festival has no such award; in actuality, this award was from the Venice International Children's Film Festival.

Following that short, Swimmer directed and, with Anthony, co-wrote the independent features Force of Impulse (1961), a Romeo and Juliet story about a high school football player who turns to robbery, filmed in Miami Beach, Florida, and Without Each Other (1962). The film was co-produced by Allen Klein and Peter Gayle with the film financed by Gayle's family's business.

=== Music and film ===
Following these dramas, Swimmer directed the pop-musical comedy Mrs. Brown, You've Got a Lovely Daughter (1968), starring the British pop group Herman's Hermits. The movie was one of a handful of similar films released in the wake of the Beatles' mockumentary-style band feature A Hard Day's Night (1964) and the comic adventure Help! (1965).

He broke into documentary filmmaking with the ABC television special Around the World of Mike Todd (1968), about the movie producer Mike Todd.

After serving as co-producer of the Neil Aspinall-Mal Evans-produced Beatles documentary Let It Be (1970), Swimmer and his indie-movie colleague Tony Anthony co-wrote and co-directed the surrealistic US-Italy road movie Come Together (1971), produced by Beatle Ringo Starr and inspired by the Beatles song "Come Together"; and produced a Spaghetti Western about a blind but deadly gunfighter, Blindman (1971; also known as Il Ciceo and Il Pistolero Ciceo), starring Anthony and Starr.

The following year, Swimmer directed The Concert for Bangladesh, organized by Beatle George Harrison with Ravi Shankar. They along with Starr, Eric Clapton, Bob Dylan, Billy Preston, Leon Russell and others performed to raise money for the charity UNICEF, earmarked to aid refugees from the newly independent nation of Bangladesh, the former East Pakistan, who had relocated to India.

In 1977, Swimmer directed the U.S.-Spain co-production The Black Pearl (a.k.a. La Perla Negra), adapted from a Scott O'Dell children's novel. He produced and directed the direct-to-video rock documentary We Will Rock You: Queen Live in Concert (1982), the record of a 1981 Montreal, Quebec, Canada show.

=== Later career ===
Swimmer developed the MobileVision Projection System, a pre-IMAX giant-screen technology for projecting movies on a 60x80-foot screen. Swimmer said that after the 1991 death of Queen lead singer Freddie Mercury, MovileVision distributed We Will Rock You in 20 countries.

His final work was the documentary Bob Marley & Friends, completed in 2005 and distributed beginning in 2006 after Swimmer worked on it for more than five years, using footage of the 1977 Rainbow concert in London, England that had been discovered in a London storage vault bombed by the Irish Republican Army. 2007.

=== Death ===
Swimmer, who moved to the Miami-area Key Biscayne, Florida, in the 1980s and to nearby Coral Gables, Florida in the 1990s, died of heart failure at Mount Sinai Medical Center in Miami on March 3, 2007.
