= The Boy Who Owned a Melephant =

1959 film

- Directed by: Saul Swimmer
- Screenplay by: Saul Swimmer; Tony Anthony
- Story by: Marvin Wald
- Produced by: Peter Gayle; Saul Swimmer; Tony Anthony
- Starring: Brockman Seawell; Molly Turner
- Narrated by: Tallulah Bankhead
- Production company: Gayle-Swimmer-Anthony Productions
- Distributed by: Universal International
- Release date: 1959
- Running time: 30 minutes
- Country: United States
- Language: English

The Boy Who Owned a Melephant is a 1959 American short film directed by Saul Swimmer and featuring Tallulah Bankhead as narrator.

== Plot ==
After seeing his first circus, young Johnnie (Brockman Seawell) asks for an elephant to keep as a pet. To placate him, his mother (Molly Turner) whimsically "gives" him the elephant in the local zoo. The boy's classmates resent his pride in "owning" the pachyderm, and the boy learns to share, making his peers equal "owners".

== Production ==
Shortly after graduating from Carnegie Mellon University in Pittsburgh, Pennsylvania, future feature-film director-producer Saul Swimmer directed the half-hour children's short The Boy Who Owned a Melephant. Co-written by Swimmer and Tony Anthony, and adapting a story by Marvin Wald, it was produced by a team credited as Gayle-Swimmer-Anthony, which included frequent collaborator Peter Gayle. It was released by Universal Pictures on October 6, 1959, or November 9, 1959 (sources differ). Narrated by actress Tallulah Bankhead, it starred her godson, Brockman Seawell (who was also actress Eugenia Rawls' son) and was shown at the Palace Theatre in New York City.

The film screened at the 1959 San Francisco International Film Festival and won a 1959 Gold Leaf award at the Venice International Children's Film Festival. On March 19, 1967, it was paired with the 1952 French short White Mane as an episode of the television anthology series CBS Children's Film Festival.
