= The Concert for Bangladesh (film) =

- British theatrical release poster
- Directed by: Saul Swimmer
- Produced by: George Harrison; Allen Klein
- Starring: George Harrison; Ravi Shankar; Bob Dylan; Ringo Starr; Leon Russell; Billy Preston; Eric Clapton; Klaus Voormann
- Cinematography: Saul Negrin; Richard Books; Fred Hoffman; Tohru Nakamura
- Edited by: Howard Lester
- Music by: George Harrison, Phil Spector (producers)
- Production company: Apple Films
- Distributed by: 20th Century Fox
- Release dates: 23 March 1972 (US); 27 July 1972 (UK)
- Running time: 99 minutes
- Countries: United Kingdom; United States
- Language: English
- Box office: $2.5 million (US/Canada)

The Concert for Bangladesh is a film directed by Saul Swimmer and released in 1972. The film documents the two benefit concerts that were organised by George Harrison and Ravi Shankar to raise funds for refugees of the Bangladesh Liberation War, and were held on Sunday, 1 August 1971 at Madison Square Garden in New York City. As well as notable performances from Harrison and Shankar, the film includes "main performer" contributions from Harrison's fellow ex-Beatle Ringo Starr, Billy Preston and Leon Russell, and a surprise walk-on from Bob Dylan. Other contributing musicians include Ali Akbar Khan, Eric Clapton, the band Badfinger, Klaus Voormann, Jesse Ed Davis, Jim Horn and Jim Keltner.

The film was the final part of Harrison's "pioneering" aid project for the people of former East Pakistan, following his "Bangla Desh" charity single, the UNICEF benefit concerts, and a triple live album of the event credited to "George Harrison and Friends". The Concert for Bangladesh was produced by The Beatles' Apple Films; after delays caused by problems with inadequate footage from the event, it opened in US cinemas in the spring of 1972. The film was released on DVD in 2005 accompanied by a newly created documentary feature, The Concert for Bangladesh Revisited with George Harrison and Friends, which included recollections from many of the project's participants and contextual input from then UN secretary-general Kofi Annan, US Fund for UNICEF president Charles Lyons and Live Aid founder Bob Geldof.

As with the live album, sales of the DVD release of the film continue to benefit the George Harrison Fund for UNICEF.

== Production ==
Saul Swimmer's Concert for Bangladesh documentary combined footage from both of the Madison Square Garden shows held on 1 August 1971, using George Harrison's preference of the performances of the songs. Harrison later explained that much of the concert footage was unusable, as a camera on the right-hand side of the venue was faulty and out of focus throughout, while the one opposite, down the left side, had cables hanging down in front of it. The compromised quality would result in some brutal edits in the released movie – Eric Clapton, for instance, appears to change jackets and guitar part-way through a song (Leon Russell's medley in particular). In an interview accompanying the 2005 DVD release of the film, Swimmer would cite the audio syncing and the frame-by-frame conversion to 70mm format (from the original 16mm) as other challenging, labour-intensive tasks. With work almost completed on the Concert for Bangladesh live album, Harrison is said to have begun editing the footage on 6 September; at some stage during the next few months, he was joined in this lengthy process by Bob Dylan.

A clip of Harrison's performance of "My Sweet Lord" was previewed during his appearance on ABC-TV's The Dick Cavett Show on 23 November, but the movie would not be ready for release until the following spring.

== Synopsis ==
The opening of the movie features footage from the New York press conference, held at Allen Klein's ABKCO offices five days before the concerts, during which Harrison and Ravi Shankar discuss the upcoming shows. Harrison is asked by a reporter: "With all the enormous problems in the world, how did you happen to choose this one to do something about?" "Because I was asked by a friend if I would help, you know – that's all," is his reply.

The scene then shifts to inside Madison Square Garden, showing musicians and support crew preparing for the first show. In voiceover, Harrison provides a brief explanation of how the project came together.

The concert begins with Harrison taking to the stage alone and addressing the audience, his comment "We've got a good show lined up – well, I hope so anyway ..." alluding to the speed with which the event was organised. He then introduces the first group of musicians, led by Shankar, who, like Harrison, attempts to convey the intricacies of Indian classical music to the audience, as well as outlining the reason for this "special benefit concert". Shankar and Ali Akbar Khan proceed to tune their instruments and then stop after about 30 seconds. The audience, apparently believing they have heard an entire piece, respond with enthusiastic applause, to which Shankar replies: "Thank you, if you appreciate the tuning so much, I hope you will enjoy the playing more." The four musicians then launch into a fifteen-minute dhun.

A brief interlude ensues, consisting of behind-the-scenes footage that shows Phil Spector, Harrison and other performers making their way to the stage. Harrison starts off the rock portion of the concert with a string of songs from his hit album All Things Must Pass. He is backed by a large band, including two drummers, Ringo Starr and Jim Keltner, pianist Leon Russell, organist Billy Preston, Klaus Voormann on bass, two other lead guitarists, Eric Clapton and Jesse Ed Davis, the four members of Badfinger on rhythm guitars and tambourine, a six-piece horn section in matching blue patterned shirts, and a small choir of backing vocalists, a few of whom are also playing percussion. Harrison then turns the concert over to his friends briefly.

Towards the end of Billy Preston's song, "That's the Way God Planned It", Preston gets up from his stool and dances across the stage and back again – much to Harrison's delight. (Like most of the concert visuals and audio, this footage is taken from the evening performance on 1 August.) Starr sings his hit song "It Don't Come Easy" scatting some of the lyrics. Harrison then returns to the spotlight for two of his own numbers, with "While My Guitar Gently Weeps" finishing with a shared Clapton / Harrison solo. Before this, Harrison introduces many of the musicians around him.

With a slight change in personnel, Russell delivers a rock and roll medley of the songs "Jumpin' Jack Flash" and "Young Blood" before Harrison performs an intimate version of another of his Beatles-era songs, "Here Comes the Sun". Harrison now introduces a newcomer to the stage, as Bob Dylan appears for a semi-acoustic set of four of his songs.

Two more numbers from Harrison close the show. When he apparently forgets part of the second verse in "Something", he looks around, seemingly at Russell or Clapton, and grins his way through it. The film concludes with a spirited version of Harrison's then-current single, "Bangla Desh", intercut at first with footage of the suffering refugees the concert was aiming to provide aid for. Towards the end of the song, Harrison exits the stage while the rest of the band plays on.

== Performances in the film ==
All songs composed and performed by George Harrison, unless otherwise noted.

=== Ravi Shankar ===
Performers: Ravi Shankar (sitar), Ali Akbar Khan (sarod), Alla Rakha (tabla), Kamala Chakravarty (tambura)

- "Bangla Dhun" (P.D.) – traditional dhun

=== George Harrison and band ===
Performers: George Harrison (vocals, electric and acoustic guitars), Ringo Starr (vocals, drums), Leon Russell (vocals, piano), Billy Preston (vocals, organ), Eric Clapton (electric guitar, slide guitar), Jesse Ed Davis (electric guitar, slide guitar), Klaus Voormann (bass), Jim Keltner (drums); with Badfinger: Pete Ham (acoustic guitar), Tom Evans (12-string acoustic guitar), Joey Molland (acoustic guitar), Mike Gibbins (percussion); with The Hollywood Horns: Jim Horn, Chuck Findley, Jackie Kelso, Allan Beutler, Lou McCreary, Ollie Mitchell; and The Soul Choir: Don Nix, Claudia Lennear, Joe Greene, Dolores Hall, Jeanie Greene, Marlin Greene, Don Preston

- "Wah-Wah"
- "My Sweet Lord"
- "Awaiting on You All"
- "That's the Way God Planned It" (Preston) – performed by Billy Preston
- "It Don't Come Easy" (Starkey) – performed by Ringo Starr
- "Beware of Darkness" – featuring Leon Russell on second lead vocal
- "While My Guitar Gently Weeps" – featuring Eric Clapton on lead guitar
- "Jumpin' Jack Flash"/"Young Blood" (Jagger–Richards/Leiber–Stoller –Pomus) – performed by Leon Russell, with additional lead vocals on "Young Blood" by Don Preston and George Harrison; featuring Preston on lead guitar and Carl Radle on bass (in place of Voormann)
- "Here Comes the Sun" – featuring Pete Ham on second acoustic guitar

=== Bob Dylan ===
Performers: Bob Dylan (vocals, acoustic guitar, harmonica), George Harrison (electric guitar, slide guitar, backing vocals), Leon Russell (bass, backing vocals), Ringo Starr (tambourine)

- "A Hard Rain's a-Gonna Fall" (Dylan)
- "It Takes a Lot to Laugh, It Takes a Train to Cry" (Dylan)
- "Blowin' in the Wind" (Dylan)
- "Just Like a Woman" (Dylan)

=== George Harrison and band: encore ===
Performers: as for George Harrison and band (above), but with Don Preston on electric guitar on "Bangla Desh"

- "Something"
- "Bangla Desh"

== Songs not in the film ==
- "Mr. Tambourine Man" – written and performed by Bob Dylan; from the evening show and included only on the Concert for Bangladesh album.
- "Love Minus Zero/No Limit" – written and performed by Dylan; recorded during the afternoon show and included as an extra on the 2005 DVD.
- "Hear Me Lord" – written and performed by George Harrison; played following Dylan's five-song set during the afternoon show but not issued on either the 1971–72 releases or the 2005 reissues.
- "If Not for You" – written and performed by Dylan, with George Harrison on harmony vocals and acoustic guitar, and Klaus Voormann on electric bass; recorded during the soundcheck on 31 July and later included as an extra on the 2005 DVD, after a very brief portion had been aired in the original film.
- "Come on in My Kitchen" – composed by Robert Johnson and performed by Leon Russell (vocals and piano) with George Harrison (lead guitar and backing vocals), Eric Clapton (second lead guitar), Billy Preston (organ), Carl Radle (bass), and Ringo Starr and Jim Keltner (both on drums); recorded during the soundcheck and included as an extra on the 2005 DVD.

== Release and reception ==
The Concert for Bangladesh was marketed with the tagline "The greatest concert of the decade. Now you can see it and hear it ... as if you were there!" and a confronting poster image designed by Tom Wilkes, showing a malnourished child beside an empty food bowl. The film received a preview screening on 22 March 1972 at New York's DeMille Theater before its official premiere the following day. John Lennon was among those attending the preview, along with wife Yoko Ono, although he left the cinema during Dylan's segment. The film also had a premiere in Los Angeles on 23 March. Reporting on the New York premiere for the NME, Nancy Lewis said that the cinema audience's enthusiastic response echoed the clamour of the audience at the concert, and that local critics gave the film "rave reviews".

The UK release was delayed until 27 July. There, it was preceded by a screening at the Rialto Cinema in central London. The Concert for Bangladesh was an instant commercial success internationally, breaking previous records for daily box-office takings in London.

In his review for the NME, John Pidgeon concluded: "The film tries to be no more than a visual album, an aim which it pursues even as far as separating the 'tracks' with darkness, and in which it undisputedly succeeds." Don Heckman of The New York Times welcomed its avoidance of the distractions that had become commonplace in rock documentaries since Woodstock, such as witness interviews and overly indulgent camerawork. He added: "The movie's very devotion to the music itself, rather than to the peripheral and ultimately transitory trappings that always surround pop music, may very well make it the most accurate filmed chronicle of pop music to come along in the last decade."

Less impressed, John Hofsess of Maclean's wrote that "rock music films such as Concert for Bangladesh don't do nearly a good enough job of uplifting people and making them feel happy", and that in comparison to Rock Around the Clock, Dont Look Back, Woodstock and Gimme Shelter, Swimmer's film "adds only a few footnotes" to the legacy of rock 'n' roll. In his review for The New York Times, Roger Greenspun described The Concert for Bangladesh as "a very good movie as such movies go (and they often go quite badly)" and expressed relief that "there are no unnecessary zooms, no lab-created light shows, almost no exploitation of the on-screen audience, no insistence that a concert of music is somehow a social revolution." Greenspun bemoaned the inclusion of a loud audience track in the six-track stereophonic presentation, but otherwise applauded the filmmakers for a work that "leaves dramatic intensity to the music and the musicians, where it belongs".

Reviewing the 2005 DVD release for BBC Online, Chris Jones wrote that Harrison had provided a "masterclass" to Bob Geldof in how to stage a superstar charity benefit and that "like nearly all good ideas, it worked best the first time around." Jones said the film's highlights were abundant: "The crowd applauding Shankar tuning up; Billy Preston's joyous dancing; Leon Russell's raucous version of 'Jumping Jack Flash'. Harrison is at once humble and masterful. And Bob, being Bob, veers between genius and parody, often in the space of one song." Steve Lowe of The Guardian described the two-DVD set as a "fascinating" record of the event, adding that "the music is hardly sharp-edged but the mammoth house-band often makes more mean more." The release debuted at number 1 on Billboard's Top Music Videos chart.

== Home media ==
Rhino Entertainment released a two-disc special edition DVD of The Concert for Bangladesh on 25 October 2005. Disc one contained the 1972 concert film while the second disc included a new 45-minute documentary, The Concert for Bangladesh Revisited with George Harrison and Friends. The latter was directed by Claire Ferguson and broadcast on UK television on 2 November.

Performers interviewed for the Revisited documentary include Ravi Shankar, Eric Clapton, Ringo Starr, Billy Preston, Jim Keltner, Jim Horn, Leon Russell and Klaus Voormann, who offer their recollections of the concert. George Harrison talks about organising the concert in voiceovers only. Other interviews are with Rolling Stone founder Jann Wenner and Live Aid organiser Bob Geldof, both of whom talk of the historic importance of the event, as well as Apple Corps executive Neil Aspinall. Charles Lyons, then president of the US Fund for UNICEF, discusses the immediate benefits of the concerts in providing funds to treat cholera among the refugees, as well as the longer-term influence of the Bangladesh relief project, as the success of the live album and film forced foreign governments to ask themselves, "Are we on the right side on this Bangladesh issue?"

Regarding Clapton's absence from the preparations, Harrison explains that he was booked on every airline flight from London to New York City for a week before the shows. After finally boarding a plane, Clapton performed without the benefit of a rehearsal, and "he was brilliant," Harrison says, somewhat generously. Clapton, for his part, recalls the time as a period of "retirement" and states that he "really made it hard" for himself in the concerts, choosing to play a hollow-body Gibson Byrdland for his solo on "While My Guitar Gently Weeps", when a solid-body would have been more appropriate.

There are also short features on the making of Saul Swimmer's film, the release of the live album, movie poster and album artwork, concert photography, and personal recollections of the historic day, Sunday, 1 August 1971. Participants in these features include Swimmer, A&M Studios engineer Norm Kinney, former Capitol Records boss Bhaskar Menon, designer Tom Wilkes, photographer Barry Feinstein, and British film mogul David Puttnam. Menon is noticeably more contrite when discussing Capitol's controversial delaying of the album than his comments at the time suggested. In the main documentary, Leon Russell describes the day of the concerts as "one high-level experience from beginning to end".

== Certifications ==
| Region | Certification | Certified units/sales |
|---|---|---|
| Australia (ARIA) | Platinum | 15,000^{^} |
^{^} Shipments figures based on certification alone.
