= Beachcomber (song) =

1960 single by Bobby Darin

Single by Bobby Darin

from the album Things and Other Things
- B-side: "Autumn Blues"
- Released: August 1960
- Recorded: February 5, 1960
- Genre: Rock and roll; swing; easy listening
- Length: 2:15
- Label: Atco
- Songwriter(s): Bobby Darin

Bobby Darin singles chronology
"Won't You Come Home Bill Bailey" (1960)	"Beachcomber" (1960)	"Artificial Flowers" (1960)

"Beachcomber" is a song by American singer Bobby Darin from his tenth studio album, Things and Other Things (1962). It was released as the lead single from the album in August 1960, by Atco Records.

== Track listing and formats ==
- US 7-inch single

A. "Beachcomber" – 2:15
B. "Autumn Blues" – 2:15

== Credits and personnel ==
- Bobby Darin – songwriter, piano

Credits and personnel adapted from the Things and Other Things album and 7-inch single liner notes.

== Charts ==
Weekly chart performance for "Beachcomber"
Chart (1960)	Peak position
US Billboard Hot 100	100
