= Sorority House (film) =

1939 film by John Farrow

- Theatrical release poster
- Directed by: John Farrow
- Screenplay by: Dalton Trumbo
- Based on: The story "Chi House" by Mary Coyle Chase
- Produced by: Robert Sisk
- Starring: Anne Shirley; James Ellison
- Cinematography: Nick Musuraca, A.S.C.
- Edited by: Harry Marker
- Music by: Roy Webb
- Production company: RKO Radio Pictures, Inc.
- Release date: May 5, 1939
- Running time: 64 minutes
- Country: United States
- Language: English

Sorority House is a 1939 American drama film starring Anne Shirley and James Ellison. The film was directed by John Farrow and based upon the Mary Coyle Chase play named Chi House.

== Plot ==
Alice Fisher is the daughter of Lew Fisher, a grocery store owner. She is surprised when he reveals he has college money for her. Alice goes to a boarding house and becomes friends with roommates Dotty Spencer and Merle Scott. Dotty suggests Alice join a sorority if she spikes up her looks and earns a few more bucks.

Meanwhile, Alice falls in love with Bill Loomis, who is dating Neva Simpson. He asks Alice out for a date and recommends her for a sorority, stating she is actually rich but pretends not to be. When Alice writes her father a letter that she doesn't have the money for a sorority, he sells his store to a chain and receives the money.

Bill and Alice soon fall in love resulting in conflicts, since Bill is still in a relationship with Neva.

== Cast ==
- Anne Shirley as Alice Fisher
- James Ellison as Bill Loomis
- Barbara Read as Dotty Spencer
- Pamela Blake as Merle Scott (billed as Adele Pearce)
- J. M. Kerrigan as Lew Fisher
- Helen Wood as Madam President Martha Lanigan
- Doris Davenport as Neva Simpson (billed as Doris Jordan)
- June Storey as Norma Hancock
- Elisabeth Risdon as Mrs. Scott
- Margaret Armstrong as Mrs. Pettingell Dawson
- Selmer Jackson as Mr. Grant
- Chill Wills as Mr. Johnson

== Production ==
Mary Coyle Chase wrote a play Chi House. It had not been produced when RKO bought the screen rights in April 1938 as a vehicle for Anne Shirley.

The film was originally going to star Shirley, Lucille Ball and Frances Mercer. By August, the title was changed to Sorority House and Dalton Trumbo was writing the script. Ball and Mercer do not appear in the final film.

Tim Holt was originally announced as male lead, intending to be reunited with Anne Shirley from Stella Dallas but this did not eventuate. The male lead was eventually played by James Ellison.

John Farrow was assigned to direct and filming began 7 February 1939.

Veronica Lake was cast in a small role, her first screen part. This was removed in the edit, but the experience encouraged Lake to pursue acting.

Sorority House was a loose reworking of RKO's earlier Finishing School (1934). Scripted by Dalton Trumbo, who'd later get into hot water with the House Un-American Activities Committee for another screenplay about a group of ladies living together, Tender Comrade (1943). This film was later used by the same House committee as evidence of Dalton Trumbo spreading communist propaganda. Trumbo was subsequently blacklisted.

== Proposed sequel ==
The film was described as a "surprise hit" and RKO announced plans to make a sequel with Shirley, Read and Ellison, mostly likely to be directed by Farrow, called Final Exams. (This sequel was announced as early as April). However, no film resulted.
