= Bankhead House (Jasper, Alabama) =

Historic house in Alabama, United States

- U.S. National Register of Historic Places
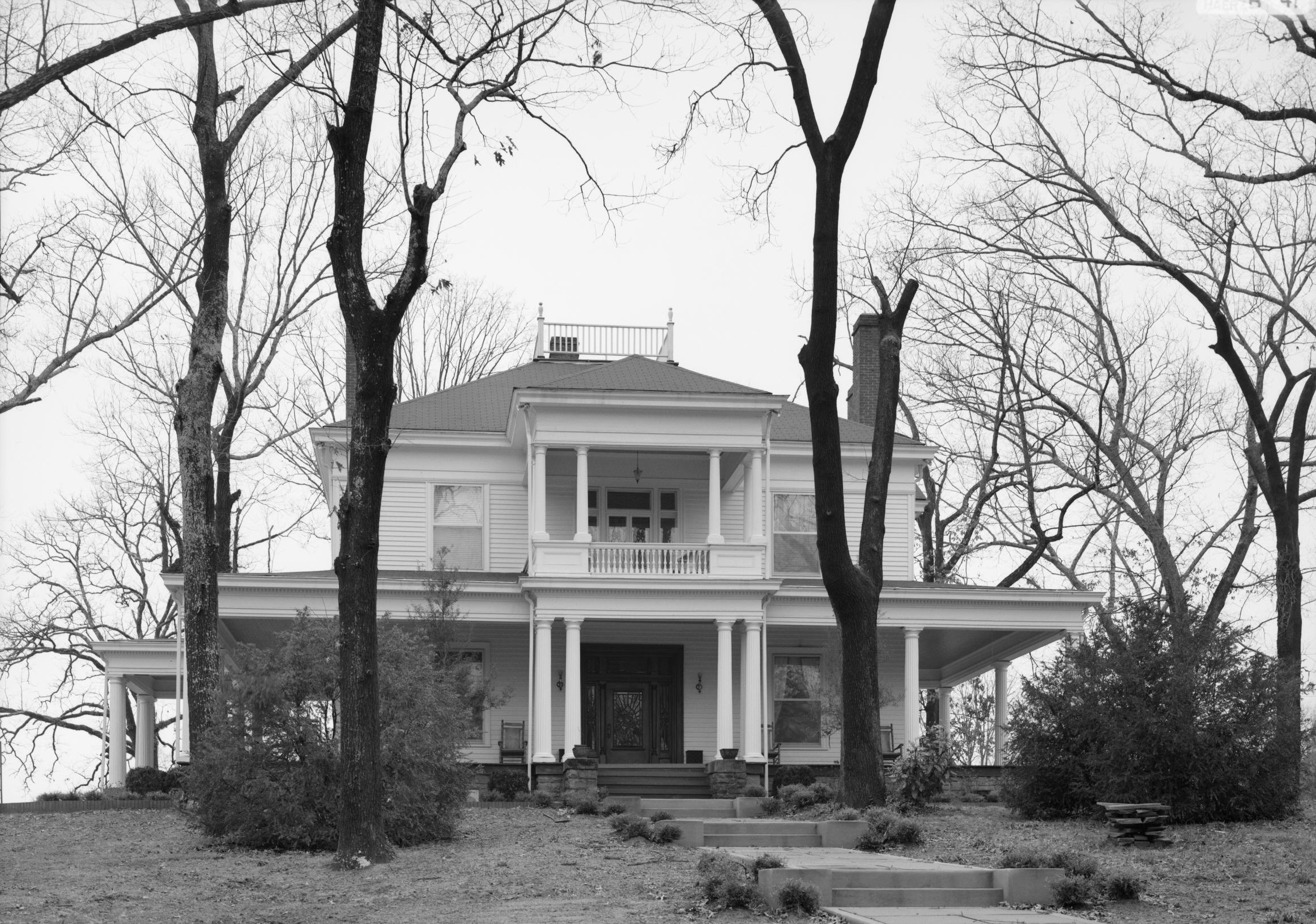
- The Bankhead House in 1993.

- Location within Alabama Location within the United States
- Location: 1400 7th Ave., Jasper, Alabama
- Coordinates: 33°50′15″N 87°16′59″W
- Area: 1.4 acres (0.57 ha)
- Built: 1910
- Architectural style: Classical Revival
- NRHP reference No.: 73000375
- Added to NRHP: June 18, 1973

The Bankhead House, also known as Sunset and the John Hollis Bankhead House, is a historic mansion in Jasper, Alabama. It was added to the National Register of Historic Places on June 18, 1973.

== History ==
The Classical Revival-style house was built for John H. Bankhead in 1910. He served in the Alabama Legislature, as a U.S. Representative, and as a U.S. Senator. His granddaughter, the award-winning actress Tallulah Brockman Bankhead and her sister Eugenia, were raised in the house when Congress was not in session. The pair were largely reared by their grandmother, Tallulah James Brockman Bankhead, after their mother died from sepsis less than a month after Tallulah's birth.

== Architecture ==
The Classical Revival-style house is a two-story wood-frame building with a stone foundation and hipped roof. It features a one-story portico that spans the full width of the front (east) of the house and partially wraps around each side. At the front central bay, the porch projects and transitions to a two-tiered portico that frames the main entrance. A porte cochere projects out from the main porch on the south side of the house. Most of the windows feature one lite per sash, typical of the time the house was built.
