= We Will Rock You (video) =

Home media by British rock band Queen

- DTS Surround Sound Edition of the 2001 Remastered DVD
- Directed by: Saul Swimmer
- Produced by: Saul Swimmer; Jim Beach
- Starring: Freddie Mercury; Brian May; Roger Taylor; John Deacon
- Cinematography: Richard E. Brooks
- Music by: Queen
- Release date: 20 December 1982
- Running time: 96 minutes
- Country: United Kingdom

We Will Rock You is a 1982 concert film by British rock band Queen. It was filmed in Montreal, Quebec, Canada, at the Montreal Forum on 24 and 25 November 1981.

The concert was initially released on multiple formats including VHS, Laserdisc and Betamax in 1984. An official release of the concert (retitled Queen Rock Montreal) digitally restored and remastered by Queen was released on 29 October 2007 on DVD (by Eaglevision). The audio release, Queen Rock Montreal, was released on double CD (by Hollywood Records for the US and Canada and by Parlophone Records for Europe and EMI for the rest of the world) and triple vinyl LP.

== Production ==
=== Background ===
In the recorded audio commentary by Saul Swimmer for the original laserdisc release of the concert. He describes the process by which he and the band went about organising and recording the concerts which eventually became this film. He is complimentary of the band and spoke positively about the experience. Specifically, he talked about the lengths he went to convince the band to make the film at the end of their then-current tour. Swimmer said the deciding moment came when he took Freddie Mercury to the Smithsonian in Washington, D.C., and showed him the three-storey IMAX screen, and told him to imagine himself five stories tall. Having convinced Mercury, the rest of the band followed suit.

=== Footage ===
Material from both nights has been used in the final version. In a number of instances, the footage is a mixture of camera shots from one night and audio recordings from the other night.

== Set list ==
1. "We Will Rock You" (fast) (May)
2. "Let Me Entertain You" (Mercury)
3. "Play the Game" (Mercury)
4. "Somebody to Love" (Mercury)
5. "Killer Queen" (Mercury)
6. "I'm in Love with My Car" (Taylor)
7. "Get Down, Make Love" (Mercury)
8. "Save Me" (May)
9. "Now I'm Here" (May)
10. "Dragon Attack" (May)
11. "Now I'm Here" (reprise) (May)
12. "Love of My Life" (Mercury)
13. "Under Pressure" (Queen/Bowie)
14. "Keep Yourself Alive" (with impromptu jam before the song) (May)
15. Drum Solo/Tympani Solo (Queen/Taylor)
16. Guitar Solo/Guitar and Drum Duel (May)
17. "Crazy Little Thing Called Love" (Mercury)
18. "Jailhouse Rock" (Leiber, Stoller)
19. "Bohemian Rhapsody" (Mercury)
20. "Tie Your Mother Down" (May)
21. "Another One Bites the Dust" (Deacon)
22. "Sheer Heart Attack" (Taylor)
23. "We Will Rock You" (May)
24. "We Are the Champions" (Mercury)
25. "God Save the Queen" (tape) (arr. May)

The tracks "Flash" and "The Hero" (both written by May) were also performed at these concerts but were deleted from the film. A commentary by Saul Swimmer (the director/producer) is an optional feature of the DVD release of We Will Rock You. The actual setlist had the performance of "Jailhouse Rock" in the encore after "Sheer Heart Attack".

== Release ==
We Will Rock You was released in cinemas on 20 December 1982 in the United Kingdom.

=== Home media ===
The concert was filmed in high quality 35mm format, but the VHS releases of the 1980s and 1990s were highly degraded versions of the original which contained notable syncing issues. Because the original film rights were 100% controlled by the production company there was little the band could do to prevent the various releases, not regaining the film rights until the early 2000s.

Released worldwide, the home video was released and re-released at various points from 1984 to 1992 in many popular formats such as VHS, Betamax, Laserdisc and V2000 with varied cover art in different territories. In the US, however, it was not released until 1986 and was edited down to include only 11 songs, instead of 21, and included vastly different cover art than had been previously used elsewhere. It was not until 1992 that a full, 21-song version was released in the US, with a portion of the proceeds benefitting the Magic Johnson AIDS Foundation. The cover art was more similar to that of other territories.

Then in 1997, 1998 and 1999, a Commemorative Edition was released throughout the world on VHS, Laserdisc and DVD with completely redesigned cover art (a blue/green background with Freddie's silhouette in black), and included Queen performing the Elvis Presley song "Jailhouse Rock", which had not been included in previous releases. Queen performed this song on many occasions throughout their career, but this was the first time an official Queen release included a performance of the song. This was also first ever commercially available Queen release on DVD.

The concert film was again re-released in 2001 on DVD and VHS, remastered in THX for enhanced audio and video quality. The cover art was again majorly redesigned and there were very noticeable improvements in sound and picture quality. It was also made available in a DTS Surround Sound edition.

There are differences between the original release and the retitled 2007 onwards with some different footage at the end of the concert, and a few subtle alternative camera angles.

== Certifications and sales ==
Certifications for We Will Rock You
Region	Certification	Certified units/sales
United States (RIAA)	2× Platinum	200,000^{^}
^{^} Shipments figures based on certification alone.
