= Artificial Flowers (song) =

1960 single by Bobby Darin

Single by Bobby Darin
- B-side: "Somebody to Love"
- Released: September 1960
- Recorded: August 18, 1960
- Genre: Pop rock
- Length: 3:14
- Label: Atco
- Songwriter(s): Jerry Bock; Sheldon Harnick

Bobby Darin singles chronology
"Beachcomber" (1960)	"Artificial Flowers" (1960)	"Christmas Auld Lang Syne" (1960)

"Artificial Flowers" is a song written by Sheldon Harnick and Jerry Bock for the musical Tenderloin and most famously recorded by American singer Bobby Darin. The Beautiful South covered the song on their 1996 album Blue is the Colour.

== Track listing and formats ==
- US 7-inch single

A. "Artificial Flowers" – 3:14
B. "Somebody to Love" – 2:12

== Credits and personnel ==
- Bobby Darin – vocals
- Jerry Bock – songwriter
- Sheldon Harnick – songwriter
- Richard Behrke – arranger

Credits and personnel adapted from the 7-inch single liner notes.

== Charts ==
Weekly chart performance for "Artificial Flowers"
Chart (1960)	Peak position
US Billboard Hot 100	20
