= Mary Chase (playwright) =

American dramatist (1906-1981)

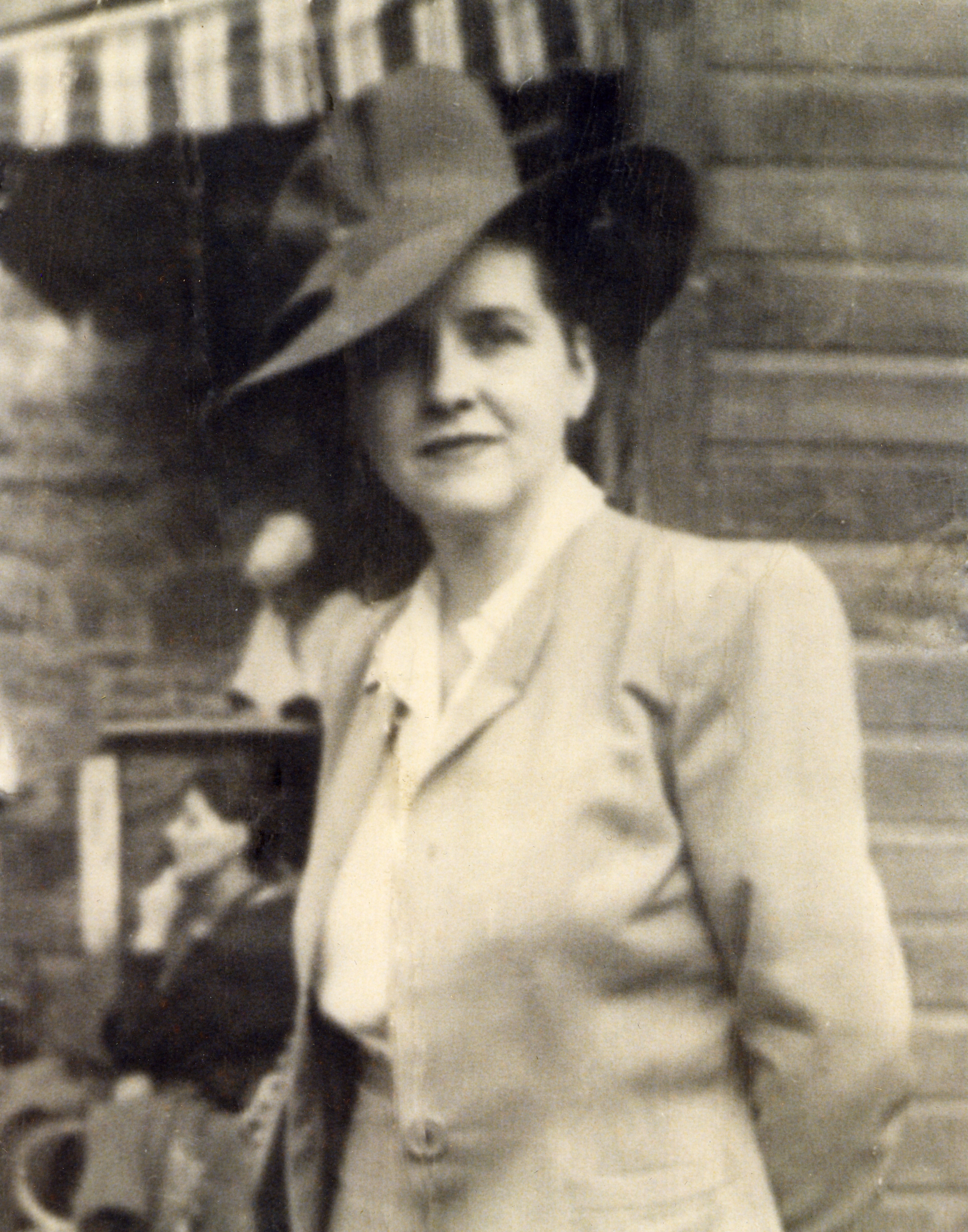
- Born: Mary Agnes McDonough Coyle; February 25, 1906; Denver, Colorado, U.S.
- Died: October 20, 1981 (aged 75); Denver, Colorado, U.S.
- Education: University of Colorado, Boulder; University of Denver
- Spouse: Robert L. Chase
- Children: 3, including Colin
- Writing career
- Notable work: Harvey
- Notable awards: Pulitzer Prize for Drama (1945)

Mary Chase (née Mary Agnes McDonough Coyle; February 25, 1906 – October 20, 1981) was an American journalist, playwright and children's novelist, known primarily for writing the 1944 Broadway play Harvey, which was adapted into the 1950 film starring James Stewart.

She wrote fourteen plays, two children's novels, and one screenplay, and worked seven years at the Rocky Mountain News as a journalist. Three of her plays were made into Hollywood films: Sorority House (1939), Harvey (1950), and Bernardine (1957).

== Early years ==
Born Mary Agnes McDonough Coyle in Denver, Colorado, in 1906, Chase remained in Denver her entire life. Of Irish Catholic descent, she grew up in the working class Baker neighborhood of Denver, not far from the railroad tracks.

She was greatly influenced by the Irish myths related to her by her mother, Mary Coyle, and her four uncles, Timothy, James, John, and Peter. Charlie Coyle, her older brother, had a strong impact on her sense of comedy, as she imitated his natural gifts at mimicry, one-liners, and comic routines. He went on to become a circus clown.

In 1921, she graduated from West High School in Denver and spent two years studying at the University of Colorado at Boulder and the University of Denver without getting a degree.

== Career ==
In 1924, Chase began her career as a journalist on the Denver Times and Rocky Mountain News. She left the News (which the Denver Times was folded into in 1926) in 1931 to write plays, do freelance reporting work, and raise a family. At the News, she started writing on the society pages, but soon became a feature writer, reporting the news from a sob sister, emotional angle, becoming part of the news itself as a comic figure, "our Lil' Mary", or writing funny, flapper era pieces as part of a series of "Charlie & Mary" stories (Charlie Wunder drew the cartoons and Mary wrote the text).

In the 1920s, reporters typically worked in The Front Page tradition: putting in long hours, drinking hard, and stopping at nothing to beat the competition to a story. Running around Denver with photographer Harry Rhoads in a Model T Ford, she recalled, "In the course of a day, Harry and I might begin at the Police Court, go to a murder trial at the West Side Court, cover a party in the evening at Mrs. Crawford Hill's mansion, and rush to a shooting at 11pm." She ended her journalistic career writing in the society pages where she had begun, perhaps as punishment for a practical joke that she played upon an unsuspecting editor.

After leaving the News, in the 1930s Chase worked as a freelance correspondent for the United Press and the International News Service. But her true love had always been the theater, so she began to write plays.

In 1936, her first play, Me Third, was produced at the Baker Federal Theater in Denver as a project of the Works Progress Administration (WPA). In the spring of 1937, the play opened on Broadway, renamed as Now You've Done It, but it failed to attract positive reviews and closed down after three weeks.

In 1938, she wrote Chi House, which was made into a Hollywood film by RKO Radio Pictures called Sorority House (1939), starring Anne Shirley of Anne of Green Gables fame.

In the early 1940s, she had a series of government, volunteer, and union jobs, serving as the Information Director for the National Youth Administration in Denver, doing volunteer work for the Colorado Foundation for the Advancement of Spanish Speaking Peoples, and working as the publicity director for the Denver branch of the Teamsters Union.

== Harvey ==
During this time, she was working on the play Harvey, which was very difficult for her to write and which went through numerous revisions, taking her two years to finish. On November 1, 1944, it opened on Broadway and was a smash hit, running for four and a half years, 1,775 performances, closing on January 15, 1949.

Harvey became the 35th longest-running show (musicals and plays) in Broadway history and, if only plays are counted, the sixth longest-running Broadway play (after Life with Father, Tobacco Road, Abie's Irish Rose, Deathtrap, and Gemini). Frank Fay and James Stewart were the most famous actors to portray Elwood P. Dowd. Josephine Hull portrayed his increasingly concerned (and socially obsessed) sister Veta Simmons on Broadway originally, and won a Best Supporting Actress Oscar in the film. Ruth McDevitt, Marion Lorne, Helen Hayes, and Swoosie Kurtz, among other actresses, also portrayed Veta either onstage or on television. Stewart was nominated for a Best Actor Oscar for the film version, but lost to Jose Ferrer for Cyrano de Bergerac.

In 1945, Chase won the Pulitzer Prize in Drama for Harvey. She is the only Coloradan to have won the Pulitzer Prize in Drama, and, in a field dominated by men, was the fourth woman to win the award, after Zona Gale (1921), Susan Glaspell (1931), and Zoe Akins (1935). From 1917 to 2013, only 14 women have won the Pulitzer in Drama.

Immediately after Harvey, Chase tried to repeat her success on Broadway with The Next Half Hour, a play based on an autobiographical novel she had written called The Banshee. It failed after a three-week run.

In 1950, Harvey was made into a Universal Studios film, starring James Stewart and Josephine Hull, with Chase collaborating with Oscar Brodney in writing the screenplay. In 1952 and 1953, she launched Bernardine and Mrs McThing on Broadway; both were moderately successful. Bernardine was made into a 1957 film starring Pat Boone and Janet Gaynor (in Gaynor's last film role). In 1958 and 1968, she wrote two children's stories, Loretta Mason Potts and The Wicked, Wicked Ladies in the Haunted House.

A 1961 production of her play, Midgie Purvis, starring Tallulah Bankhead, flopped. A 1970 Harvey revival, starring James Stewart and Helen Hayes, was successful and ran for 79 performances while a 1981 musical adaptation of Harvey, entitled Say Hello to Harvey, failed after a six-week run amid negative reviews in Toronto.

== Personal life ==
In 1928, Mary Coyle married Robert L. (Bob) Chase, a fellow reporter at the Rocky Mountain News. Bob Chase was a seasoned, "hard news" reporter, having worked at the Denver Express since 1922, covering the robbery of the US Mint and fighting against the rise of the Ku Klux Klan in Colorado state and local politics. The Express eventually merged with the Rocky Mountain News and Bob Chase went on to a 47-year newspaper career at the paper, becoming managing editor and then associate editor. He was a founding member in 1936 (and named vice-president) of the Denver chapter of the American Newspaper Guild, a national labor union representing editors and reporters.

In 1932, their first son, Michael, was born, followed by Colin in 1935, and then Barry Jerome (Jerry) in 1937. Michael became the director of public television in New York, Colin was a professor of English literature at the University of Toronto, and Jerry worked as a college academic counselor in New York City, and wrote the play Cinderella Wore Combat Boots.

== Death ==
In 1981, four days after attending the world premiere in Toronto of the musical adaptation by Leslie Bricusse, Say Hello to Harvey, Mary Coyle Chase suffered a heart attack at her home in Denver and died at the age of 75.

== Recent events ==
In August 2009, Steven Spielberg announced that he was planning a remake of Harvey, with Tom Hanks or Will Smith playing Elwood Dowd. By December he had abandoned the project, the main reason being the difficulty of finding a star to play the lead role. Tom Hanks was not interested in walking in the shoes of the beloved, iconic star James Stewart. Robert Downey Jr. was in the mix for several months, but he wanted changes to the script and Spielberg decided to pull the plug.

On June 14, 2012, the Roundabout Theatre Company opened its Broadway revival of Harvey to positive reviews at the Studio 54 Theatre. The production starred Emmy Award winner Jim Parsons (The Big Bang Theory), returning to Broadway after a successful run in the revival of The Normal Heart in the summer of 2011. Harvey was directed by Scott Ellis and also featured Charles Kimbrough (Emmy nominee, Murphy Brown) in the role of psychiatrist William Chumley and Jessica Hecht as Veta. Harvey ran until August 5, 2012.

== Honors ==
- 1944: William McLeod Raine Award, Colorado Authors' League
- 1945: Pulitzer Prize in Drama
- 1947: Honorary Doctorate of Letters from the University of Denver
- 1960: Receives the Monte Meacham Award from the Children's Theater Conference of the AETA (American Educational Theater Association).
- 1985: Inducted into the Colorado Women's Hall of Fame, along with Golda Meir, the "Unsinkable" Molly Brown, and Mamie Eisenhower.
- 1999: Inducted into the Colorado Performing Arts Hall of Fame alongside Douglas Fairbanks, Sr. and Glenn Miller.

== Bibliography ==
Plays

- Me Third (1936)
- Chi House (1938)
- Slip of a Girl (1941)
- Harvey (1944)
- The Next Half Hour (1945)
- Bernardine (1952)
- Lolita (1954)
- Mrs. McThing (1954) (also presented on television)
- Midgie Purvis (1961)
- The Prize Play (1961)
- The Dog Sitters (1963)
- Mickey (1969)
- Cocktails With Mimi (1974)
- The Terrible Tattoo Parlor (1981)

Children's stories

- Loretta Mason Potts (1958)
- The Wicked, Wicked Ladies In the Haunted House (1968)

== Film adaptations ==
- Sorority House (1939)
- Harvey (1950)
- Bernardine (1957)
