= Ron Husmann =

American actor (b.1937)

- Born: June 30, 1937 (age 89); Rockford, Illinois, U.S.
- Other name: Ron Hussman
- Education: Northwestern University
- Occupation: Actor
- Years active: 1959–1989

Ron Husmann (born June 30, 1937) is a retired American actor who primarily acted in musicals. In 1961, he was nominated for a Tony Award and won a Theatre World Award for his performance in the original production of Tenderloin.

== Biography ==
Born in Rockford, Illinois, Husmann graduated from Northwestern University in 1959. He made his Broadway debut in Fiorello! in November 1959. In October 1960 he appeared on Broadway in Tenderloin, garnering a Tony Award nomination for Best Featured Actor in a Musical and winning the Theatre World Award for his performance.

Additional Broadway credits include All-American (1962), Lovely Ladies, Kind Gentlemen (1970), On the Town (revival, 1971), Irene (1973), and Can-Can (1981).

Husmann made his film debut in the 1965 melodrama Love Has Many Faces. Most of his screen credits have been on television. One of his first was a co-starring role in the unaired 1965 ABC television pilot Two's Company starring Marlo Thomas. He has appeared in the daytime soaps General Hospital and Days of Our Lives, as well as such primetime series as Dr. Kildare, Land of the Giants, Get Smart, The F.B.I., Archie Bunker's Place, and Cheers. He was the sidekick to Buddy Hackett on the Fal 1980 revival of You Bet Your Life and the host of the pilot for the 1969 game show You're Putting Me On. He appeared in the 1972 telecast of Once Upon a Mattress with Carol Burnett.

Husmann is the author, narrator, and co-producer of the ten-hour video series Broadway! A History of the Musical.

He retired from performing after being diagnosed with spasmodic dysphonia.
