= No Bigger than a Minute =

- Written by: Steven Delano, Amy Kaplan
- Directed by: Steven Delano
- Starring: Peter Dinklage, Werner Herzog, Bushwick Bill
- Theme music composer: Jon Hegel
- Original language: English

Production
- Producers: Steven Delano, Diane Markrow
- Cinematography: James Phelan
- Editor: Chad Herschberger
- Running time: 53 minutes

Original release
- Network: PBS
- Release: 2006

No Bigger than a Minute is a 2006 documentary film about dwarfs in the media as well as filmmaker Steven Delano's own cathartic effort to deal with his dwarfism, something he ignored for almost forty years. Delano interviews actor Peter Dinklage, director Werner Herzog, and rapper Bushwick Bill as he deals with the question: If genetic engineering can weed out the condition, is that something we would want to do?

No Bigger than a Minute had its television premiere in 2006 as part of PBS's Point of View series.
