= Dhun =

Instrumental piece in Hindustani classical music

A dhun (Hindi: धुन; literally "tune") is a light instrumental piece in Hindustani classical music. Although it may be played in a raga, or mode (often light ragas such as Khamaj), it is more freely interpreted and may incorporate foreign notes (vivadi).

A dhun may be based on a folk tune or a religious, bhajan-type song, or even a filmi song.

== See also ==
- Bangla Dhun
- malshree dhun
