= Tallulah Bankhead =

American actress (1902–1968)

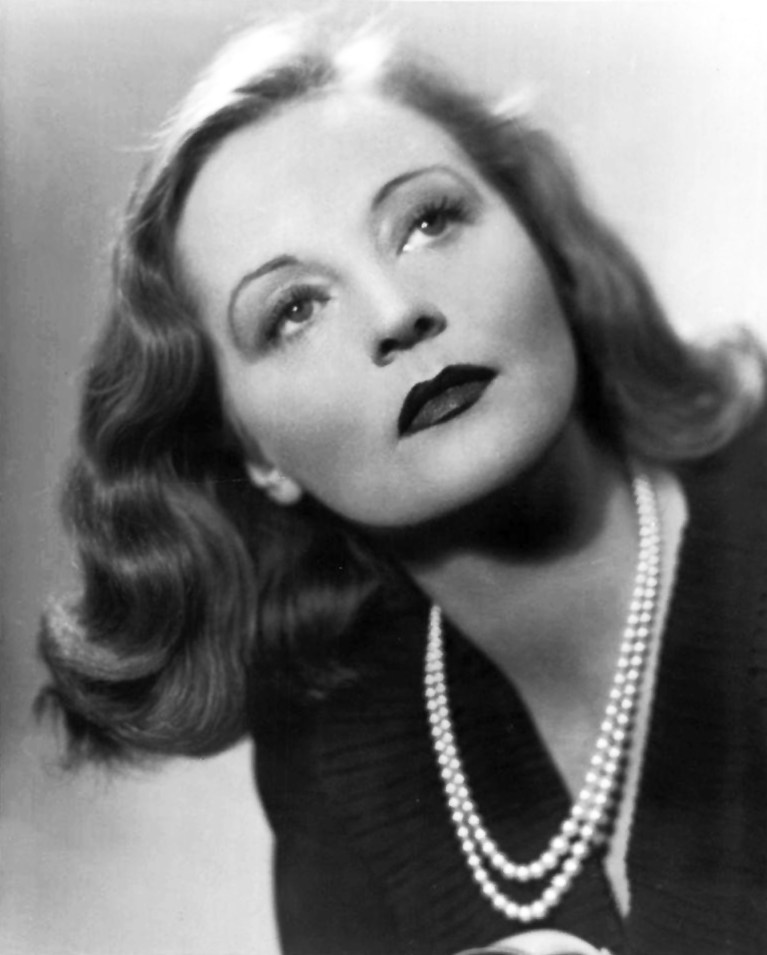
- Bankhead in 1941
- Born: Tallulah Brockman Bankhead; January 31, 1902; Huntsville, Alabama, U.S.
- Died: December 12, 1968 (aged 66); New York City, U.S.
- Resting place: Saint Paul's Churchyard; Kent County, Maryland, U.S.
- Occupation: Actress
- Years active: 1918–1968
- Political party: Democratic Party
- Spouse: John Emery (m. 1937; div. 1941)
- Father: William B. Bankhead
- Relatives: John H. Bankhead (paternal grandfather); John H. Bankhead II (paternal uncle); Walter W. Bankhead (cousin)

Tallulah Brockman Bankhead (January 31, 1902 – December 12, 1968) was an American actress. Primarily an actress of the stage, Bankhead also appeared in several films including an award-winning performance in Alfred Hitchcock's Lifeboat (1944). She also had a brief but successful career on radio and made appearances on television. In all, Bankhead amassed nearly 300 film, stage, television and radio roles during her career. She was posthumously inducted into the American Theater Hall of Fame in 1972 and the Alabama Women's Hall of Fame in 1981.

Bankhead was a member of the Bankhead and Brockman family, prominent politically in Alabama. Her grandfather and her uncle were U.S. senators, and her father was Speaker of the House of Representatives. Bankhead supported liberal causes, including the budding civil rights movement. She also supported foster children and helped families escape the Spanish Civil War and World War II.

Bankhead was an alcohol and drug user; she reportedly smoked 120 cigarettes a day and talked candidly about her vices. She also had a series of sexual relationships with both men and women.

== Early life ==
Bankhead, aged 15 (second from left), with grandfather John H. Bankhead (left), father William B. Bankhead, and sister Eugenia, circa 1917

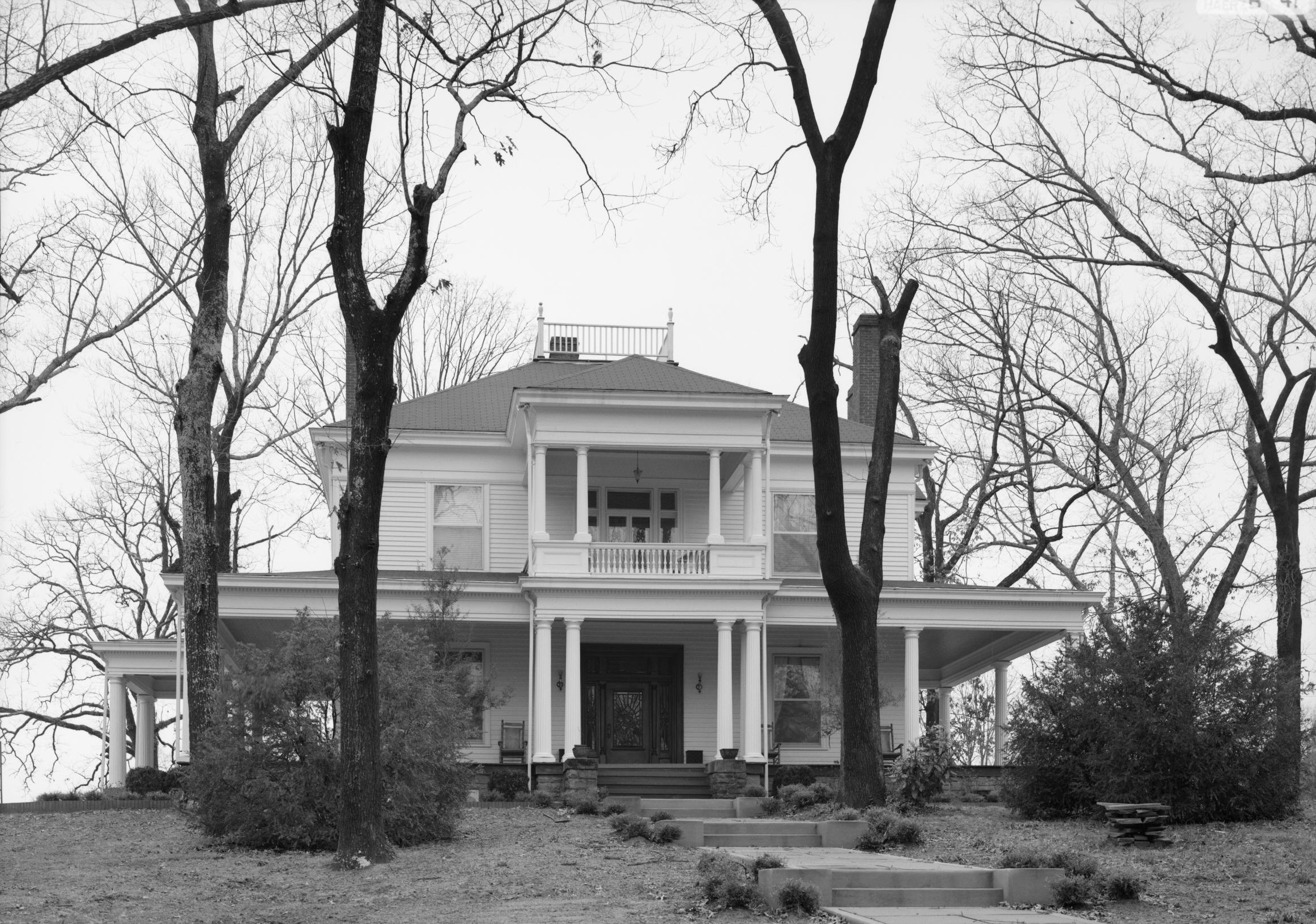
Sunset, the Bankhead house in Jasper, Alabama, where Bankhead and her sister grew up

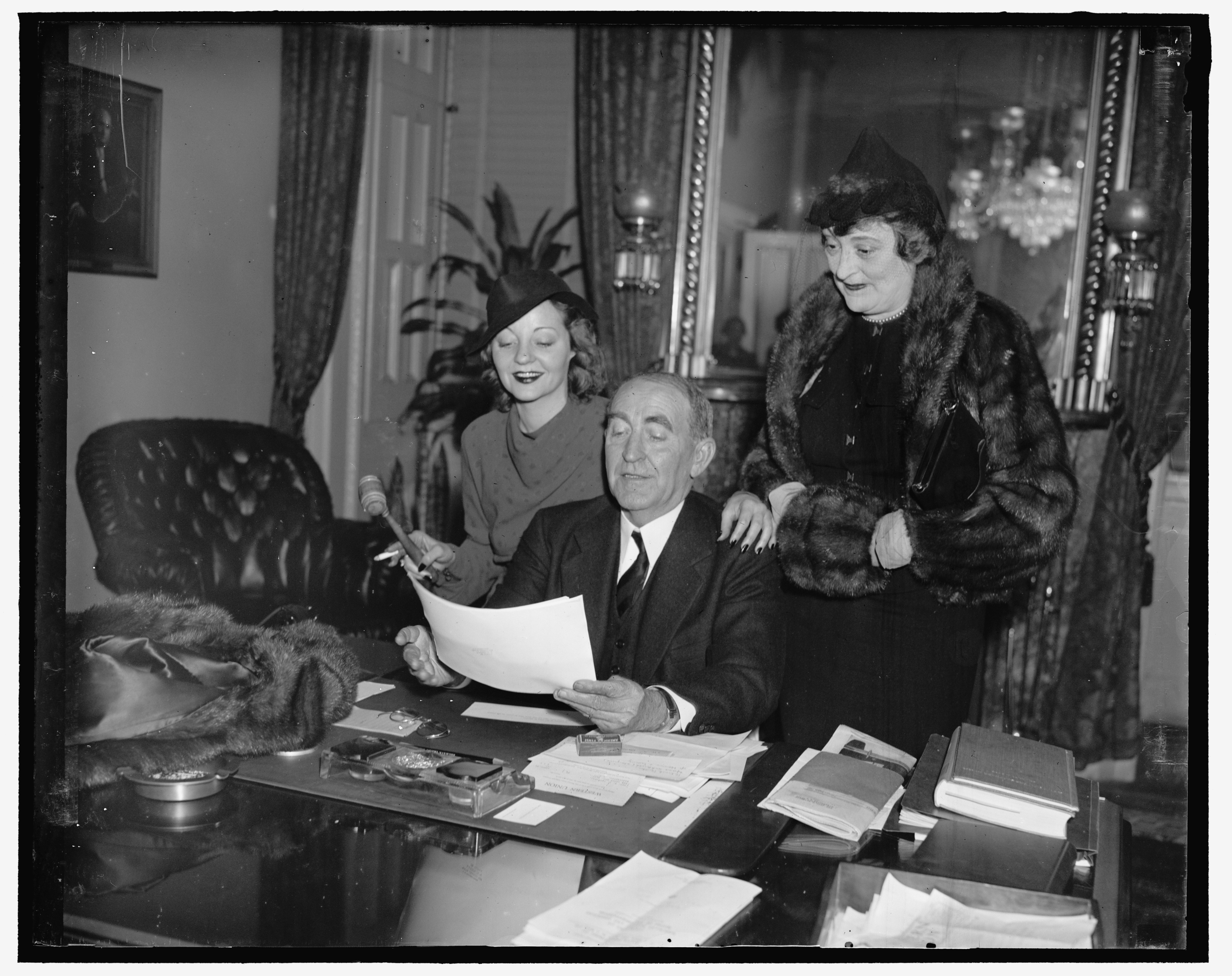
Bankhead (left) with her father and stepmother in his office as Speaker of the House, 1937

Tallulah Brockman Bankhead was born on January 31, 1902, in Huntsville, Alabama, to William Brockman Bankhead and Adelaide Eugenia "Ada" Bankhead (née Sledge); her great-great-grandfather, James Bankhead (1738–1799) was born in Ulster, Ireland, and settled in South Carolina. Bankhead was named after her paternal grandmother, who in turn was named after Tallulah Falls, Georgia. (Note: For the ultimate source of the name Tallulah, see Tallulah River#Etymology of name) Her father hailed from the Bankhead and Brockman political families, active in the Democratic Party of the South in general and of Alabama in particular. Her father was the Speaker of the United States House of Representatives from 1936 to his death in 1940. She was the niece of Senator John H. Bankhead II and granddaughter of Senator John H. Bankhead. Her mother, Adelaide "Ada" Eugenia Sledge, was a native of Como, Mississippi, and was engaged to another man when she met William Bankhead on a trip to Huntsville to buy her wedding dress. The two fell in love at first sight and were married on January 31, 1900, in Memphis, Tennessee. Their first child, Evelyn Eugenia (January 24, 1901 – May 11, 1979), was born two months prematurely and had some vision difficulties.

The following year, Bankhead was born on her parents' second wedding anniversary, in a second-floor apartment in what is now known as the Isaac Schiffman Building, where her father also had his office. A marker was erected to commemorate the site, and in 1980 the building was placed on the National Register of Historic Places. Three weeks after Bankhead's birth, her mother died of blood poisoning (sepsis) on February 23, 1902. (Note: Bankhead's maternal grandmother had also died giving birth to her mother) On her deathbed, Ada told her sister-in-law to "take care of Eugenia, Tallulah will always be able to take care of herself". Bankhead was baptized next to her mother's coffin.

William B. Bankhead, devastated by his wife's death, descended into bouts of depression and alcoholism. Consequently, Tallulah and her sister Eugenia were mostly reared by their paternal grandmother, Tallulah James Brockman Bankhead, at the family estate called Sunset in Jasper, Alabama. As a child, Bankhead was described as "extremely homely" and overweight, while her sister was slim and prettier. As a result, she did everything in her efforts to gain attention, and constantly sought her father's approval. After watching a performance at a circus, she taught herself how to cartwheel, and frequently cartwheeled about the house, sang, and recited literature that she had memorized. She was prone to throwing tantrums, rolling around the floor, and holding her breath until she was blue in the face. Her grandmother often threw a bucket of water on her to halt these outbursts.

Bankhead's husky voice (which she described as "mezzo-basso") was the result of chronic bronchitis due to childhood illness. She was described as a performer and an exhibitionist from the beginning, discovering at an early age that theatrics gained her the attention she desired. Finding she had a gift for mimicry, she entertained her classmates by imitating the schoolteachers. Bankhead said that her "first performance" was witnessed by the Wright brothers, Orville and Wilbur. Her Aunt Marie gave the brothers a party at her home near Montgomery, Alabama, in which the guests were asked to entertain. "I won the prize for the top performance, with an imitation of my kindergarten teacher", Bankhead wrote. "The judges? Orville and Wilbur Wright." Bankhead also found she had a prodigious memory for literature, memorizing poems and plays and reciting them dramatically.

Their grandmother and aunt were beginning to find the girls difficult to handle. Their father William, who was working from their Huntsville home as a lawyer, proposed enrolling them in a convent school (although he was a Methodist and her mother an Episcopalian). In 1912, both girls were enrolled in the Convent of the Sacred Heart in Manhattanville, New York. Their father remarried in 1915; as his political career brought him to Washington, they were enrolled in a series of different schools, each a step closer to Washington. When Bankhead was 15, her aunt encouraged her to take more pride in her appearance, suggesting that she go on a diet to improve her confidence. Bankhead quickly matured into a southern belle.

Bankhead was childhood friends with American socialite, later novelist, Zelda Sayre Fitzgerald, who married the novelist F. Scott Fitzgerald.

== Career ==
=== Beginnings in New York (1917–1922) ===
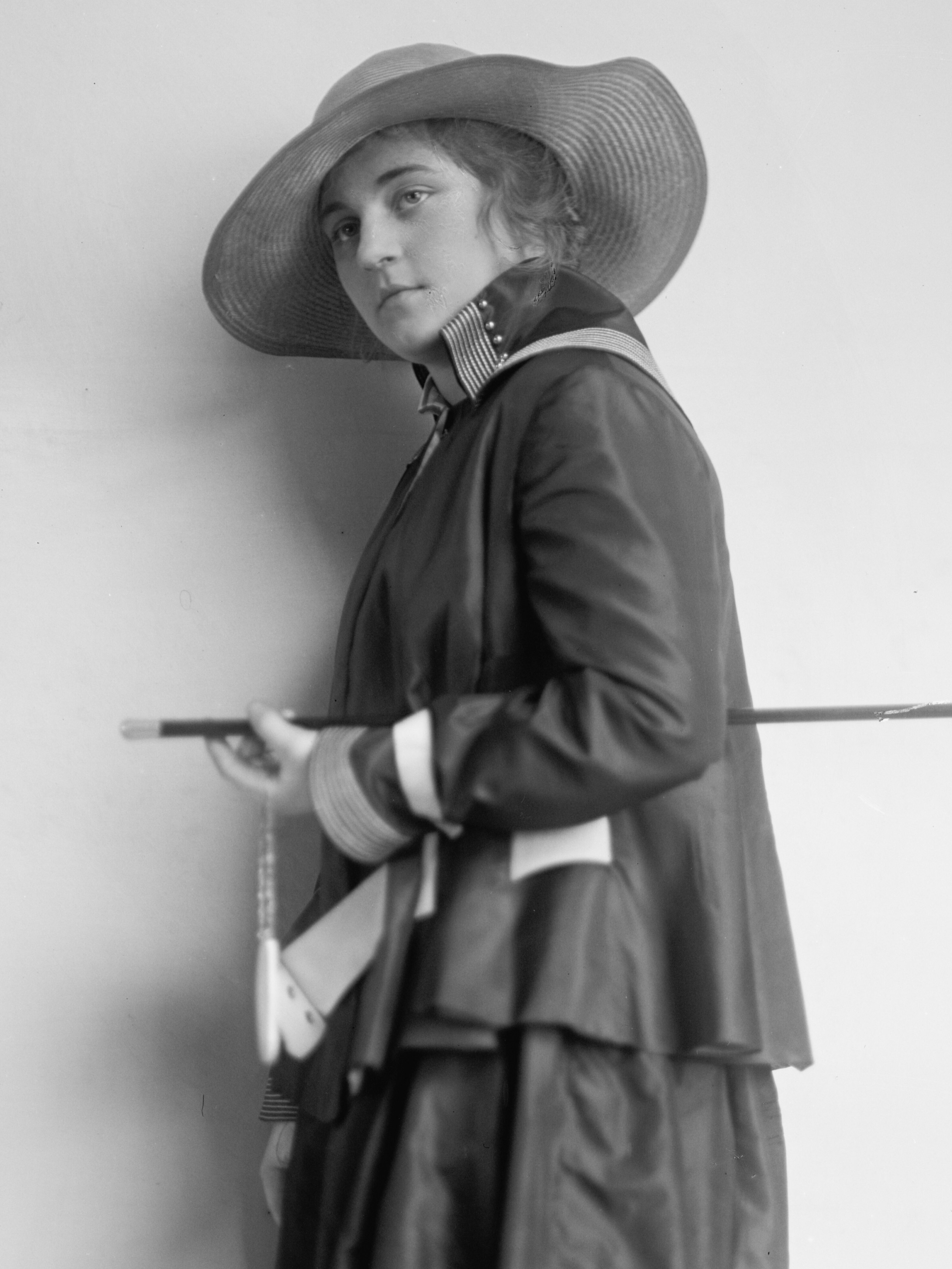
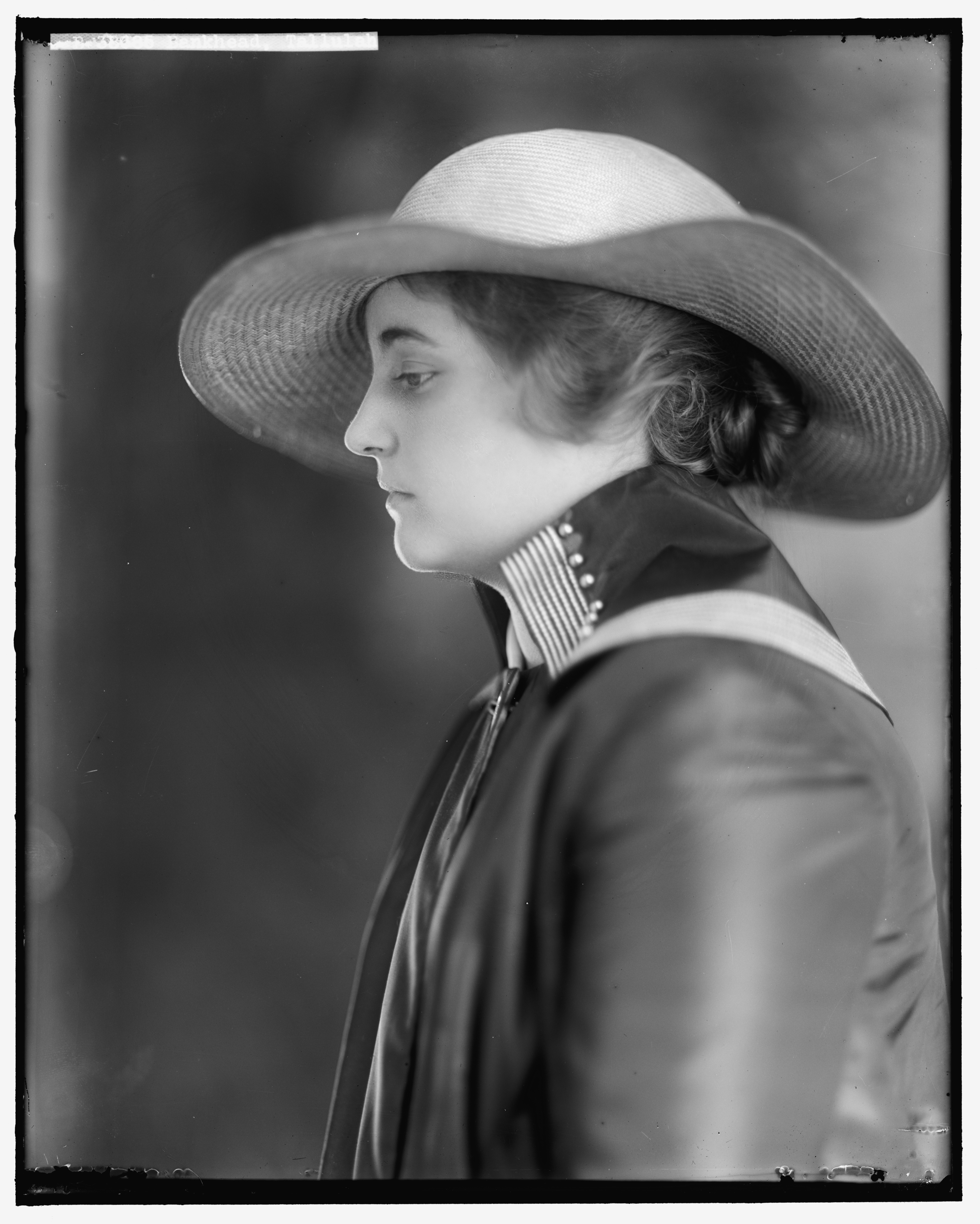
Bankhead as a teenager c. 1917

At 15, Bankhead submitted her photo to Picture Play, which was conducting a contest and awarding a trip to New York plus a movie part to 12 winners based on their photographs. However, she forgot to send in her name or address with the picture. Bankhead learned that she was one of the winners while browsing the magazine at her local drugstore. Her photo in the magazine was captioned "Who is She?", urging the mystery girl to contact the paper at once. Congressman William Bankhead sent in a letter to the magazine with her duplicate photo.

Arriving in New York, Bankhead discovered that her contest win was fleeting: she was paid $75 for three weeks' work on Who Loved Him Best and had only a minor part, but she quickly found her niche in New York City. She soon moved into the Algonquin Hotel, a hotspot for the artistic and literary elite of the era, where she quickly charmed her way into the famed Algonquin Round Table of the hotel bar. She was dubbed one of the "Four Riders of the Algonquin", consisting of Bankhead, Estelle Winwood, Eva Le Gallienne, and Blyth Daly. Three of the four were non-heterosexual: Bankhead and Daly were bisexuals, and Le Gallienne was a lesbian. At the Algonquin, Bankhead befriended actress Estelle Winwood. She also met Ethel Barrymore, who attempted to persuade her to change her name to Barbara. Bankhead declined, and Vanity Fair later wrote "she's the only actress on both sides of the Atlantic to be recognized by her first name only."

Bankhead's father had warned her to avoid alcohol and men when she got to New York; Bankhead later quipped "He didn't say anything about women and cocaine." The Algonquin's wild parties introduced Bankhead to marijuana and cocaine, of which she later remarked "Cocaine isn't habit-forming and I know because I've been taking it for years." Bankhead did abstain from drinking, keeping half of her promise to her father.

In 1919, after roles in three other silent films, When Men Betray (1918), Thirty a Week (1918), and The Trap (1919), Bankhead made her stage debut in The Squab Farm at the Bijou Theatre in New York. She soon realized her place was on stage rather than screen, and had roles in 39 East (1919), Footloose (1919), Nice People (1921), Everyday (1921), Danger (1922), Her Temporary Husband (1922), and The Exciters (1922). Though her acting was praised, the plays were commercially and critically unsuccessful. Bankhead had been in New York for five years, but had yet to score a significant hit. Restless, Bankhead moved to London.

=== Fame in the United Kingdom (1922–1931) ===
In 1923, she made her debut on the London stage at Wyndham's Theatre. She appeared in over a dozen plays in London over the next eight years, most famously in The Dancers and at the Lyric as Jerry Lamar in Avery Hopwood's The Gold Diggers. Her fame as an actress was ensured in 1924 when she played Amy in Sidney Howard's They Knew What They Wanted. The show won the 1925 Pulitzer Prize.

While in London, Bankhead bought herself a Bentley, which she loved to drive. She was not very competent with directions and constantly found herself lost in the London streets. She would telephone a taxi-cab and pay the driver to drive to her destination while she followed behind in her car. During her eight years on the London stage and touring across UK theatres, Bankhead earned a reputation for making the most out of inferior material. For example, in her autobiography, Bankhead described the opening night of a play called Conchita:

In the second act. ... I came on carrying a monkey. ... On opening night, the monkey went berserk. ... (he) snatched my black wig from my head, leaped from my arms and scampered down to the footlights. There he paused, peered out at the audience, then waved my wig over his head. ... The audience had been giggling at the absurd plot even before this simian had at me. Now it became hysterical. What did Tallulah do in this crisis? I turned a cartwheel! The audience roared. ... After the monkey business I was afraid they might boo me. Instead I received an ovation.

=== Career in Hollywood (1931–1933) ===
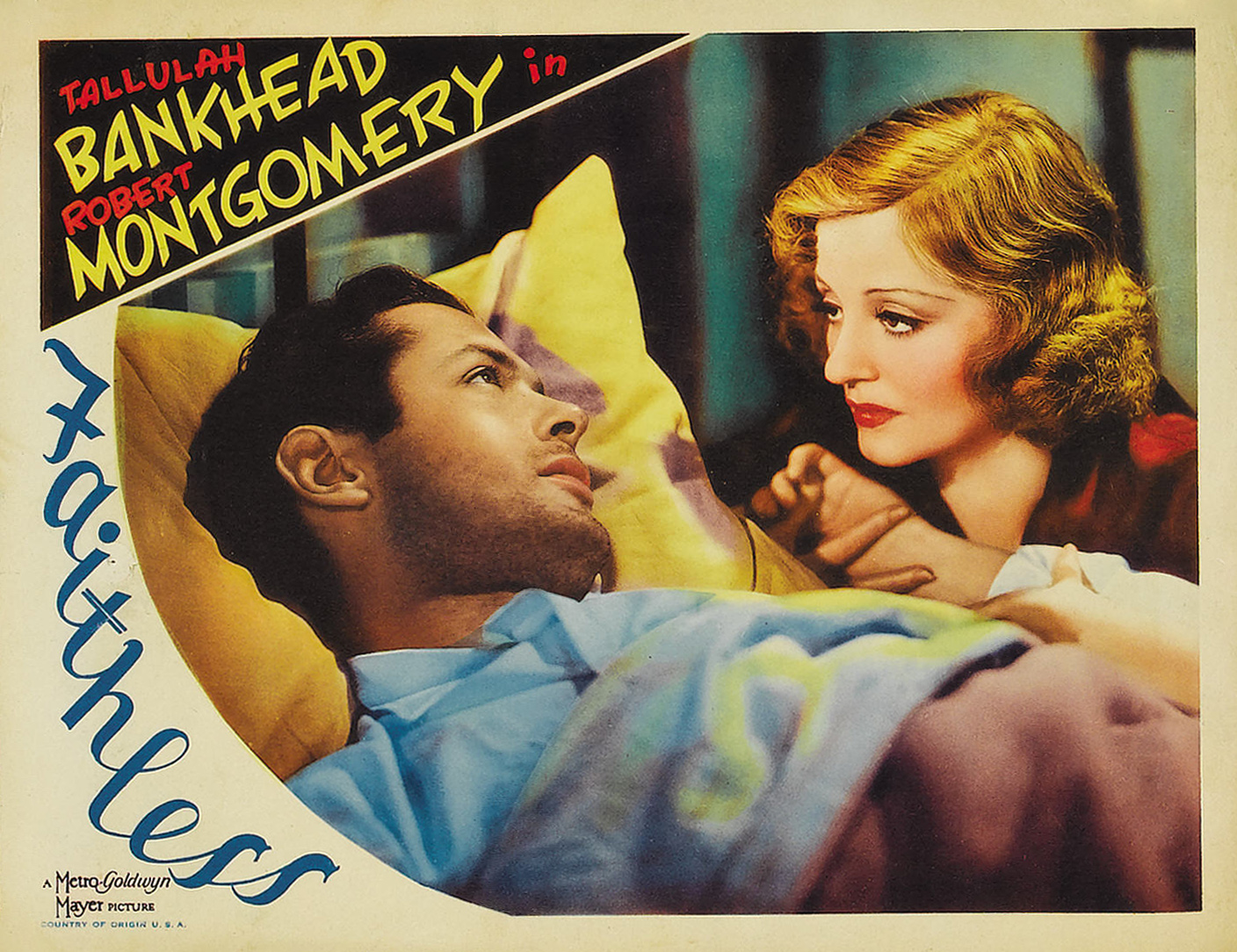
Lobby card for Faithless

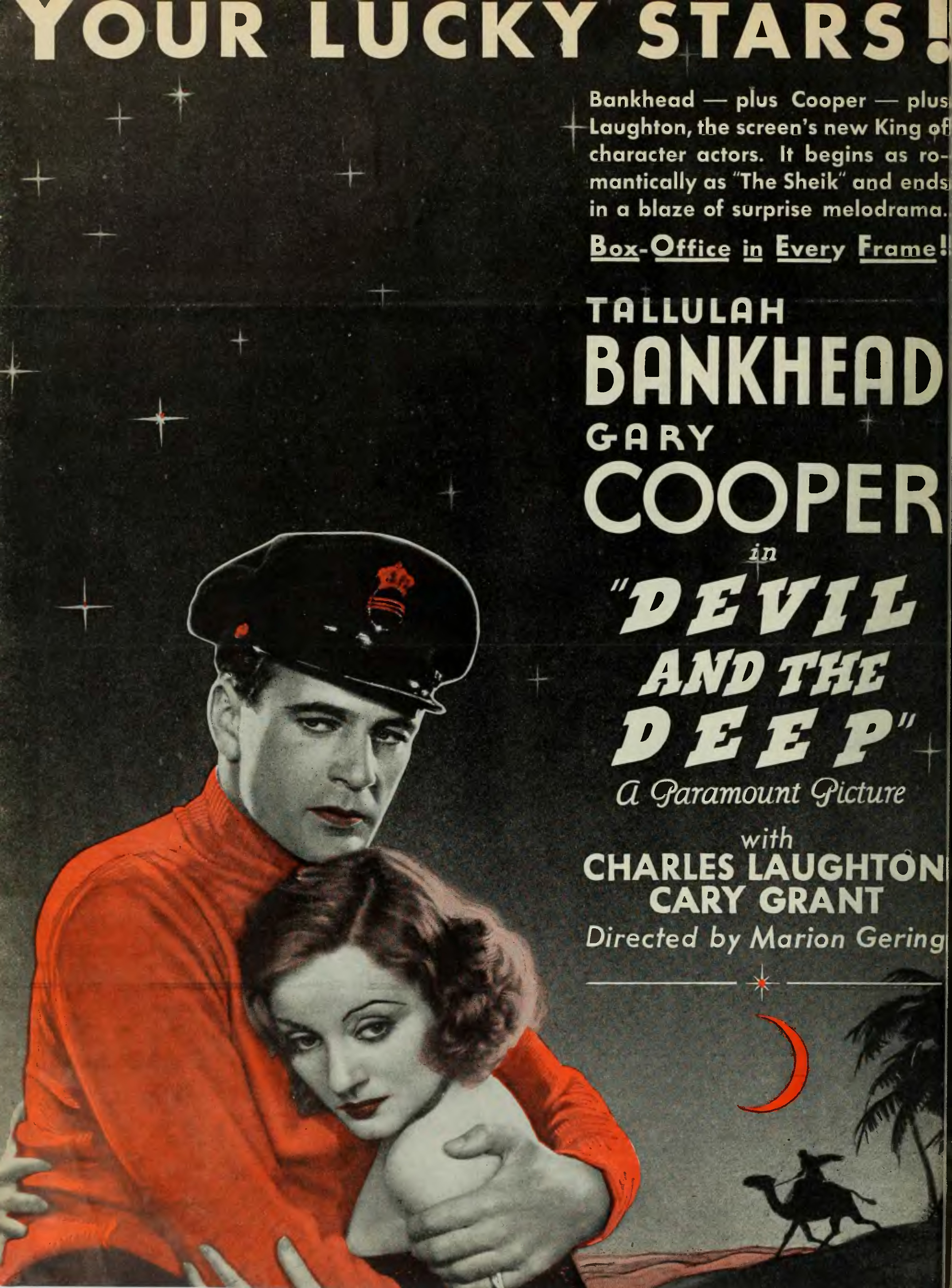
Devil and the Deep 1932 ad in The Film Daily

Bankhead returned to the United States in 1931, but Hollywood success eluded her in her first four films of the 1930s. She rented a home at 1712 Stanley Street in Hollywood (now 1712 North Stanley Avenue) and began hosting parties that were said to "have no boundaries". Bankhead's first film was Tarnished Lady (1931), directed by George Cukor, and the pair became fast friends. Bankhead behaved herself on the set and filming went smoothly, but she found film-making to be very boring and did not have the patience for it. After over eight years of living in Great Britain and touring on their theatrical stages, she did not like living in Hollywood; when she met producer Irving Thalberg, she asked him "How do you get laid in this dreadful place?" Thalberg retorted "I'm sure you'll have no problem. Ask anyone." Although Bankhead was not very interested in making films, the opportunity to make $50,000 per film was too good to pass up. Her 1932 movie Devil and the Deep is notable for the presence of three major co-stars, with Bankhead receiving top billing over Gary Cooper, Charles Laughton, and Cary Grant; it is the only film with Cooper and Grant in the cast, although they share no scenes together. She later said "Dahling, the main reason I accepted [the part] was to fuck that divine Gary Cooper!" Later in 1932, Bankhead starred opposite Robert Montgomery in Faithless.

=== Return to Broadway (1933–1938) ===
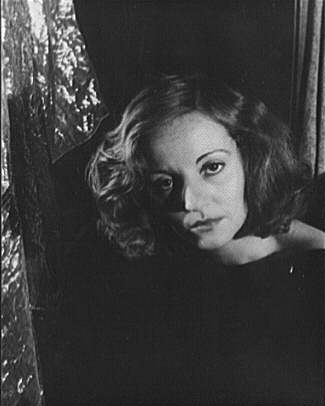
Bankhead in 1934

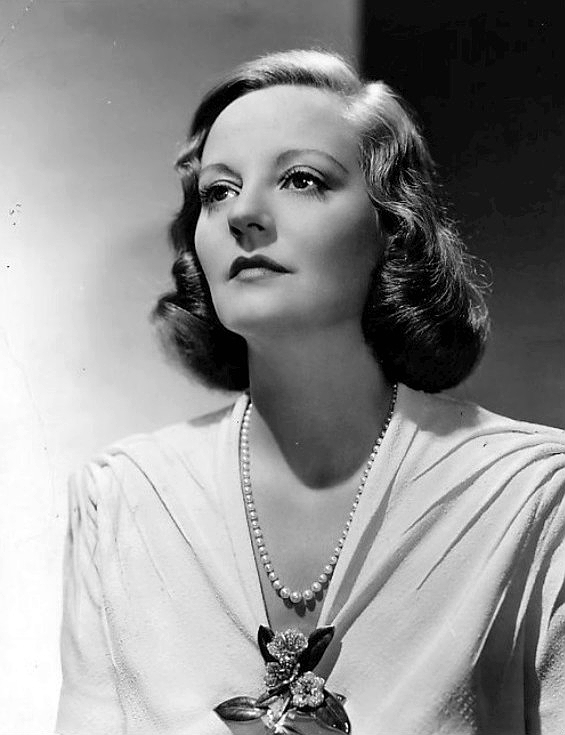
Bankhead in 1940

Returning to Broadway, Bankhead worked steadily in a series of middling plays which were, ironically, later turned into highly successful Hollywood films starring other actresses. 1933's Forsaking All Others by Edward Barry Roberts and Frank Morgan Cavett—a romantic comedy-drama in which three friends sustain a love triangle lasting several years—was a modest success for Bankhead, running 110 performances, but the 1934 film version with Joan Crawford was one of that year's bigger financial and critical successes. Similarly, Bankhead's next two short-lived plays, Jezebel by Owen Davis and Dark Victory by George Brewer Jr. and Bertram Bloch, were both transformed into high-profile, prestigious film vehicles for Bette Davis.

Bankhead persevered, even through ill health. In 1933, while performing in Jezebel, Bankhead nearly died following a five-hour emergency hysterectomy due to gonorrhea, which she claimed she had contracted from either Gary Cooper or George Raft. Weighing only 70 lb (32 kg) when she left the hospital, she vowed to continue her lifestyle, flippantly telling her doctor "Don't think this has taught me a lesson!"

Bankhead continued to play in various Broadway performances over the next few years, gaining excellent notices for her portrayal of Elizabeth in a revival of Somerset Maugham's The Circle. However, when she appeared in Shakespeare's Antony and Cleopatra with her then-husband John Emery, the New York Evening Post critic John Mason Brown memorably carped, "Tallulah Bankhead barged down the Nile last night as Cleopatra – and sank."

In a private memo written in 1936, David O. Selznick, producer of Gone with the Wind (1939), called Bankhead the "first choice among established stars" to play Scarlett O'Hara in the upcoming film. Although her 1938 screen test for the role in black-and-white was superb, she photographed poorly in Technicolor. Selznick also reportedly believed that at age 36, she was too old to play Scarlett, who is 16 at the beginning of the film (the role eventually went to Vivien Leigh). Selznick sent Kay Brown to Bankhead to discuss the possibility of Bankhead playing brothel owner Belle Watling in the film, which she turned down.

=== Critical acclaim (1939–1945) ===
==== Regina and Sabina ====
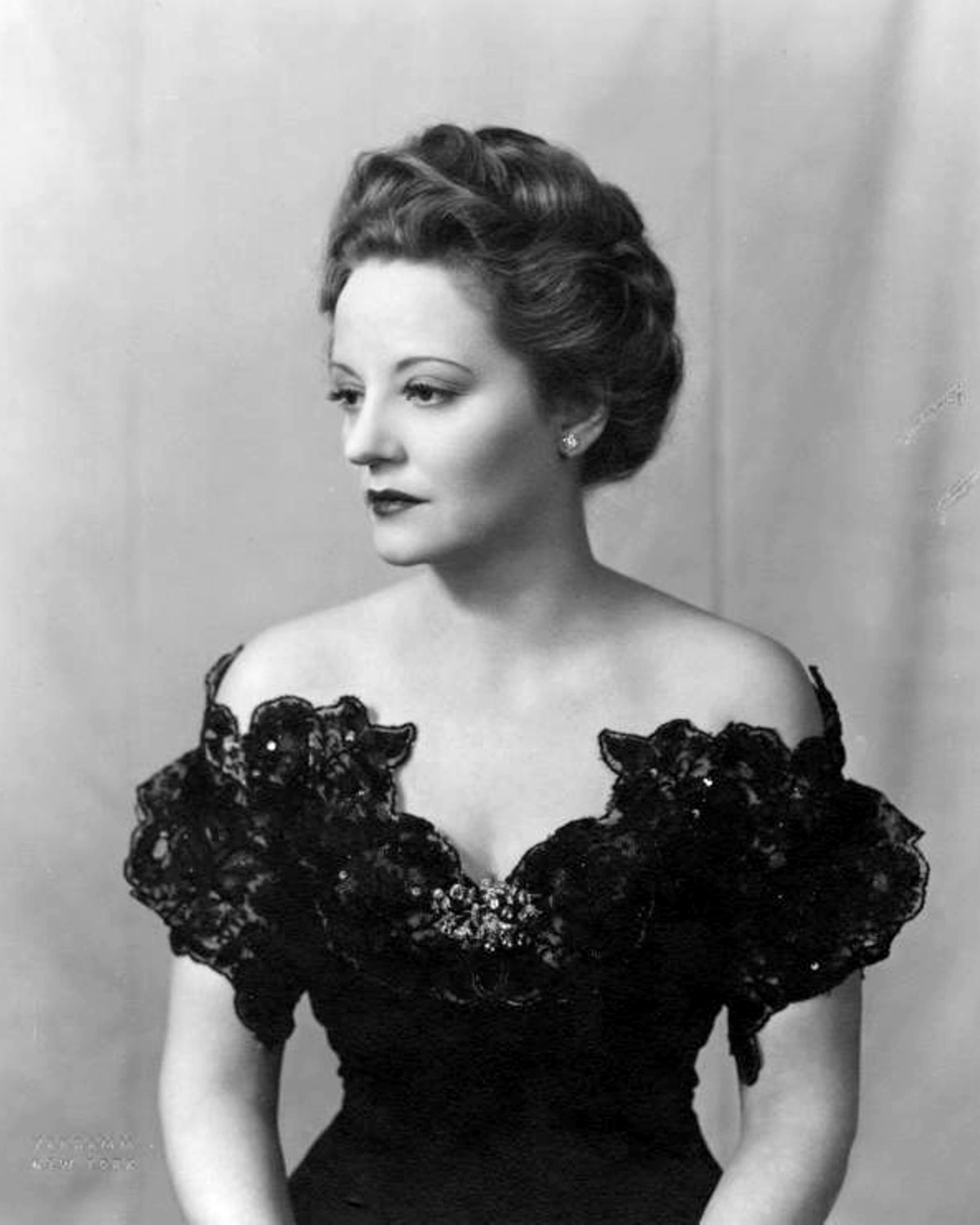
Bankhead as Regina Giddens in The Little Foxes (1939)

Her brilliant portrayal of the cold and ruthless, yet fiery Regina Giddens in Lillian Hellman's The Little Foxes (1939) won her Variety magazine's award for Best Actress of the Year. Bankhead as Regina was lauded as "one of the most electrifying performances in American theater history". During the run, she was featured on the cover of Life. Bankhead and playwright Hellman, both formidable women, feuded over the Soviet Union's invasion of Finland. Bankhead (a strong critic of communism from the mid 1930s onwards) was said to want a portion of one performance's proceeds to go to Finnish relief, and Hellman (a communist who had defended the Moscow Trials of 1936, and was a member of the Communist Party USA in 1938–40) objected strenuously, and the two women did not speak for the next quarter of a century, eventually reconciling in late 1963. Nevertheless, Bankhead called the character of Regina in Hellman's play "the best role I ever had in the theater".

Bankhead earned another Variety award and the New York Drama Critics' Award for Best Performance by an Actress followed her role in Thornton Wilder's The Skin of Our Teeth, in which Bankhead played Sabina, the housekeeper and temptress, opposite Fredric March and Florence Eldridge (husband and wife offstage). About her work in Wilder's classic, the New York Sun wrote: "Her portrayal of Sabina has comedy and passion. How she contrives both, almost at the same time, is a mystery to mere man." She also clashed with Elia Kazan on The Skin of Our Teeth and during rehearsals of Clash by Night she called the producer, Billy Rose a "loathsome bully" who retorted, "How could anyone bully Niagara Falls?"

==== Lifeboat ====
Alfred Hitchcock's Lifeboat (1944) with Henry Hull

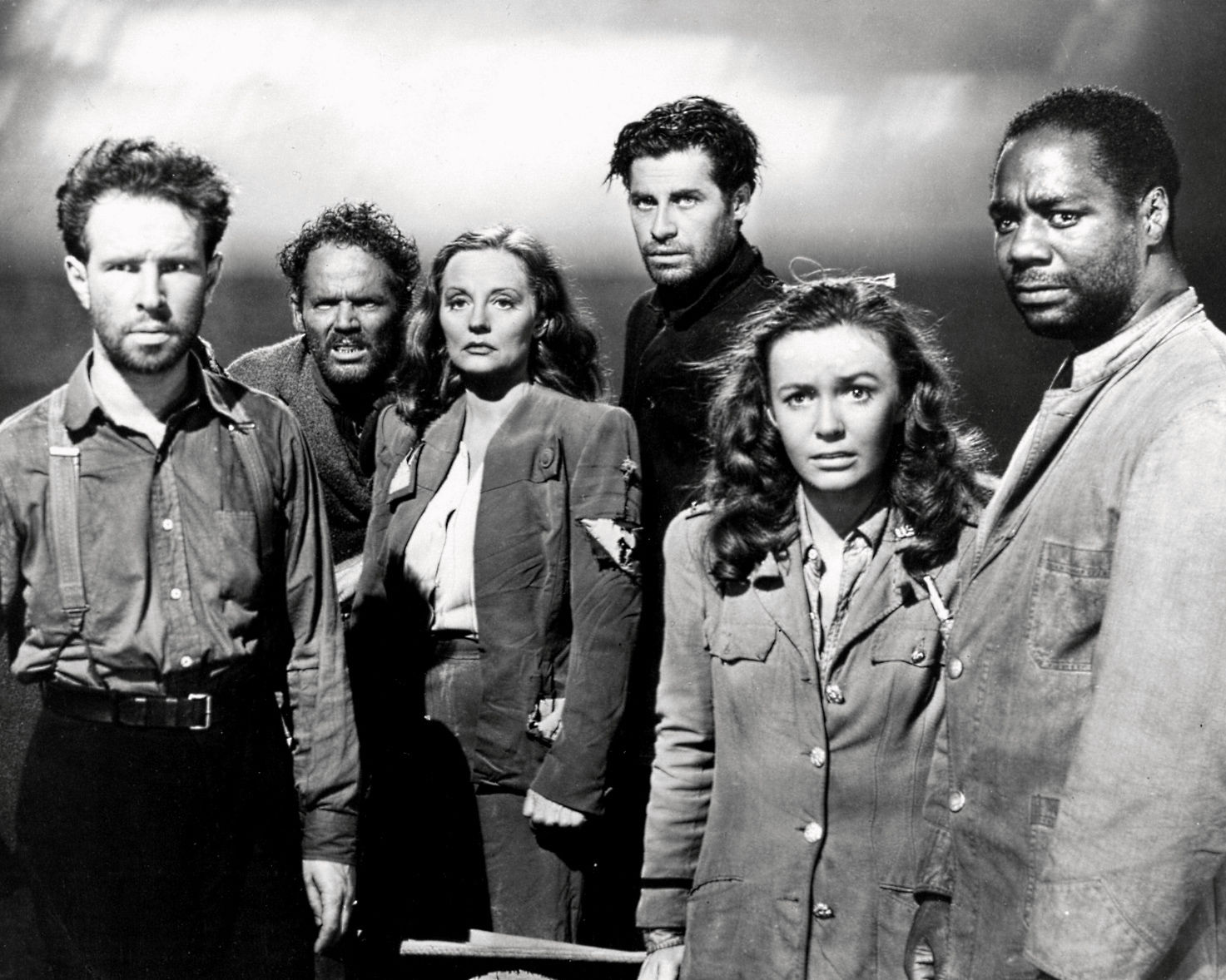
Hitchcock's Lifeboat (1944) with Hume Cronyn, Henry Hull, Bankhead, John Hodiak, Mary Anderson and Canada Lee

In 1944, Alfred Hitchcock cast her as cynical journalist Constance Porter in her most successful film, both critically and commercially, Lifeboat. The film takes place entirely on a small boat, and was shot in a large water tank on a studio lot. During filming, the actors were sometimes battered by water-spraying machines and fans. Bankhead wrote in her memoirs that she was "black and blue from the downpours and lurchings". At one point, she contracted bronchial pneumonia, halting production for a number of days. Bankhead famously did not wear underwear during production, which became apparent when she climbed up or down the ladder leading to the water tank. A widely repeated anecdote has it that Hitchcock, when pressed to do something about this, mused that he was unsure whether it was a matter for the wardrobe department, makeup, or hairdressing.

Her superbly multifaceted performance was acknowledged as her best on film and won her the New York Film Critics Circle award. A beaming Bankhead accepted her New York trophy and exclaimed: "Dahlings, I was wonderful!"

=== Renewed success (1948–1952) ===
Bankhead appeared in a revival of Noël Coward's Private Lives, taking it on tour and then to Broadway for the better part of two years. The play's run made Bankhead a fortune. From that time, Bankhead could command 10% of the gross and was billed larger than any other actor in the cast, although she usually granted equal billing to Estelle Winwood, a frequent co-star and close friend from the 1920s through Bankhead's lifetime.

In 1950, in an effort to cut into the rating leads of The Jack Benny Program and The Edgar Bergen and Charlie McCarthy Show, which had jumped from NBC radio to CBS radio the previous season, NBC spent millions over the two seasons of The Big Show starring "the glamorous, unpredictable" Bankhead as its host, in which she acted not only as mistress of ceremonies, but also performed monologues (often written by Dorothy Parker) and songs. Despite Meredith Willson's Orchestra and Chorus and top guest stars from Broadway, Hollywood, and radio, The Big Show, which earned rave reviews, failed to do more than dent Jack Benny and Edgar Bergen's ratings. The next season, NBC installed her as one of a half-dozen rotating hosts of NBC's television variety program The All Star Revue on Saturday nights.

Bankhead was director Irving Rapper's first choice for the role of Amanda in the film version of Tennessee Williams' The Glass Menagerie. Laurette Taylor, who originated the role of Amanda, was an idol of Bankhead's and also an alcoholic, whose brilliant performance in the original Broadway production reversed years of career decline. Rapper called Bankhead's screen test the greatest performance he had ever seen: "I thought she was going to be difficult, but she was like a child, so sweet and lovely. I was absolutely floored by her performance. It's the greatest test I've ever made or seen in my life. I couldn't believe I was seeing such reality. Bankhead was absolutely natural, so moving, so touching without even trying. The crew was stunned, too." But studio head Jack Warner rejected the idea because of his fear of Bankhead's drinking; though she promised not to drink during shooting, he refused to give her the part. The role was given instead to Gertrude Lawrence, whose acting was panned by most critics.

=== Late career (1952–1968) ===
Bankhead wrote a bestselling autobiography Tallulah: My Autobiography (Harper & Bros.) that was published in 1952. Though Bankhead's career slowed in the mid-1950s, she never faded from the public eye. Her highly public and often scandalous personal life began to undermine her reputation as a terrific actress, leading to criticism she had become a caricature of herself. Although a heavy smoker, heavy drinker, and consumer of sleeping pills, Bankhead continued to perform in the 1950s and 1960s on Broadway, in radio and television, and in the occasional film, even as her body got more and more frail from the mid 1950s up until her death in 1968.

In 1953, Bankhead was enticed into appearing in a stage act at the Sands Hotel in Las Vegas. She was paid a generous $20,000 per week for her appearances, reciting scenes from famous plays, reading poetry and letters that had the audience in stitches, and sang. Las Vegas critics bet her act would flop, but instead it was highly successful. She returned to the Sands for three years.

==== Addiction, illness and icon status ====
Around this time, Bankhead began to attract a passionate and highly loyal following of gay men, some of whom she employed as help when her lifestyle began to take a toll on her, affectionately calling them her "caddies". Though she had long struggled with addiction, her condition now worsened – she began taking dangerous cocktails of drugs to fall asleep, and her maid had to tape her arms down to prevent her from consuming pills during her periods of intermittent wakefulness. In her later years, Bankhead had serious accidents and several psychotic episodes from sleep deprivation and hypnotic drug abuse. Though she always hated being alone, her struggle with loneliness began to lapse into a depression. In 1956, playing the truth game with Tennessee Williams, she confessed, "I'm 54, and I wish always, always, for death. I've always wanted death. Nothing else do I want more."

===== The Ford Lucille Ball-Desi Arnaz Show =====
Bankhead's most popular and perhaps best remembered television appearance was the December 3, 1957 episode of The Ford Lucille Ball-Desi Arnaz Show. She played herself in the classic episode "The Celebrity Next Door". The part was originally slated for Bette Davis, but Davis had to bow out after cracking a vertebra. Lucille Ball was reportedly a fan of Bankhead and did a good impression of her. By the time the episode was filmed, however, both Ball and Desi Arnaz were deeply frustrated by Bankhead's off-camera behavior during rehearsals. It took her three hours to "wake up" once she arrived on the set and she often seemed drunk. She also refused to listen to the director and she did not like rehearsing. Ball and Arnaz apparently did not know about Bankhead's antipathy to rehearsals or her ability to memorize a script quickly. After rehearsals, the filming of the episode proceeded without a hitch, and Ball congratulated Bankhead on her performance.

==== Last years on stage ====
In 1956, Bankhead appeared as Blanche DuBois (a character inspired by her) in a revival of Tennessee Williams' A Streetcar Named Desire (1947). Williams (a close friend) had wanted Bankhead for the original production, but she turned it down. He called her Blanche "the worst I have seen", accusing her of ruining the role to appease her fans who wanted camp. She agreed with this verdict, and made an effort to conquer the audience which her own legend had drawn about her, giving a performance two weeks later of which he remarked: "I'm not ashamed to say that I shed tears almost all the way through and that when the play was finished I rushed up to her and fell to my knees at her feet. The human drama, the play of a woman's great valor and an artist's truth, her own, far superseded, and even eclipsed, to my eye, the performance of my own play." The director remarked that her performance exceeded those of Jessica Tandy and Vivien Leigh in the role. However, the initial reviews had decided the production's fate, and the producer pulled the plug after 15 performances.

Bankhead received a Tony Award nomination for her performance of a bizarre 50-year-old mother in the short-lived Mary Chase play Midgie Purvis (1961). It was a physically demanding role and Bankhead insisted on doing the stunts herself, including sliding down a staircase banister. She received glowing reviews, but the play suffered from numerous rewrites and failed to last beyond a month. Her last theatrical appearance was in The Milk Train Doesn't Stop Here Anymore (1963), a revival of another Williams play, directed by Tony Richardson. She had suffered a severe burn on her right hand from a match exploding while she lit a cigarette, and it was aggravated by the importance of jewelry props in the play. She took heavy painkillers, but these dried her mouth, and most critics thought that Bankhead's line readings were unintelligible. As with Antony and Cleopatra, the nadir of her career, she only made five performances, and in the same unhappy theater.

==== New media ====
Among her last radio appearances was in an episode of the BBC's Desert Island Discs with Roy Plomley in 1964. Bankhead, at 62 and audibly suffering from breathing difficulties from emphysema in the interview, frankly spoke of how hopeless she would be on a desert island, admitting that she "couldn't put a key in the door, dahling. I can't do a thing for myself." In the interview, host Plomley spoke of Bankhead's glory days as the most celebrated actress of 1920s London. Later he recalled of their interview, "She was a very frail and ailing old lady, and I was shocked to see how old and ill she looked as I helped her out of a taxi. She had come from her hotel wearing a mink coat slung over a pair of lounging pyjamas, and she leaned heavily on my arm as I supported her to the lift. Her eyes were still fine, and there was still beauty in the bone structure of her face beneath the wrinkles and ravages of hard living. Her hands shook, and when she wished to go to the loo she had to ask Monica Chapman to accompany her to help her with her clothing."

Her last motion picture was a British horror film, Fanatic (1965). Fanatic was released in the U.S. as Die! Die! My Darling!, which she protested, thinking it was exploiting her famous catchphrase, but did not succeed in getting it changed. During the screening she held privately for her friends, she apologized for "looking older than God's wet nurse" (in the film she wore no makeup and dyed her hair grey, and the director used very claustrophobic close-ups to accentuate her age and frailty). She called the B-movie horror flick "a piece of shit", though her performance in it was praised by critics and it remains popular as a cult film and with her fans. For her role in Fanatic, she was paid $50,000. Her last appearances on television came in March 1967 as the villainous Black Widow in the Batman TV series, and in the December 17, 1967, episode of The Smothers Brothers Comedy Hour comedy-variety TV series, in the "Mata Hari" skit. She also appeared in NBC's famous lost Tonight Show Beatles interview that aired on May 14, 1968. Sitting behind the interview desk and beside Joe Garagiola, who was substituting for an absent Johnny Carson, she took an active role during the interview, questioning Paul McCartney and John Lennon. George Harrison and Ringo Starr were not present and were in England at the time, as noted during the interview.

== Personal life ==
Bankhead was famous not only as an actress, but also for her many affairs, compelling personality, and witticisms such as, "There is less to this than meets the eye" and "I'm as pure as the driven slush." She was an extrovert, uninhibited and outspoken, and said that she "lived for the moment".

Bankhead was an avid baseball fan whose favorite team was the New York Giants. This was evident in one of her famous quotes, through which she gave a nod to the arts: "There have been only two geniuses in the world, Willie Mays and Willie Shakespeare. But, darling, I think you'd better put Shakespeare first." Bankhead identified as an Episcopalian despite not being what might then have been called "the typical churchgoing type".

Bankhead's sister, Eugenia, lived in Chestertown, Maryland, near which Bankhead was buried.

=== Political activism ===
Like her family, Bankhead was a Democrat, but even more than her father, she broke with prevailing Southern attitudes on many issues. She supported civil rights and strongly opposed racism and segregation. In the 1924 United States presidential election, Bankhead voted for Robert La Follette of the Progressive Party, but voted for the Democratic presidential nominee at every U.S. presidential election from 1928 to 1968, traveling back to the United States from the United Kingdom in 1924 and 1928 in order to visit her family and to place her vote in person.

In the 1948 presidential election, Bankhead supported the election of Harry S. Truman. At the time, Truman faced opposition not just from the Republican Party, but also from splits to his right and to his left from within the Democratic ranks. Bankhead is credited with having helped Truman immeasurably by belittling his rival, New York's Governor and Republican presidential candidate Thomas E. Dewey. Truman defied predictions by defeating Dewey and winning the election. After Truman was elected, Bankhead was invited to sit with the president during his inauguration on January 20, 1949. While viewing the inauguration parade, she booed the South Carolina float which the state's governor Strom Thurmond, a staunch segregationist who had recently run against Truman on the Dixiecrat ticket, which had split the Democratic vote by running on a pro-segregationist ticket that appealed to most Southern Democrats.

In Democratic primaries and campaigns of later years, Bankhead supported Estes Kefauver in 1952, Adlai Stevenson II in 1956, John F. Kennedy in 1960, Lyndon B. Johnson in 1964 and Eugene McCarthy in 1968. Bankhead would quickly switch to campaigning for the winning Democratic nominee, such as Adlai Stevenson II in 1952 and Hubert Humphrey in 1968, if her original pick failed to win the nomination. She was also close friends with Truman, Kefauver, and Stevenson.

=== Marriage ===
Bankhead married actor John Emery on August 31, 1937, at her father's home in Jasper, Alabama. Bankhead filed for divorce in Reno, Nevada, in May 1941. It was finalized on June 13, 1941. That day Bankhead told a reporter, "You can definitely quote me as saying there will be no plans for a remarriage."

She had no children, but had four abortions before undergoing a hysterectomy in 1933, when she was 31. She was the godmother of Brook and Brockman Seawell, children of her lifelong friend, actress Eugenia Rawls and husband Donald Seawell.

=== Sexuality and sexual exploits ===
Bankhead had many affairs and spoke openly about her sex life, for example describing herself as "a very satisfied Jane" after sex with Johnny Weissmuller, who played Tarzan, in the pool of the Garden of Allah Hotel. In 1932, controversy arose over an interview that she gave to Motion Picture magazine, in which she complained that she had gone too long without an affair:

I'm serious about love. I'm damned serious about it now. ... I haven't had an affair for six months. Six months! Too long. ... If there's anything the matter with me now, it's not Hollywood or Hollywood's state of mind. ... The matter with me is, I WANT A MAN! ... Six months is a long, long while. I WANT A MAN!

Time ran a story about it, angering Bankhead's family. Bankhead immediately telegraphed her father, vowing never to speak with a magazine reporter again. For these and other offhand remarks, Bankhead was cited in the Hays Commission's "Doom Book", a list of 150 actors and actresses considered "unsuitable for the public" that was presented to the studios. Bankhead was at the top of the list with the heading: "Verbal Moral Turpitude".

In her autobiography, published after the release of Alfred Kinsey's Sexual Desire in the Human Male, she states, "I found no surprises in the Kinsey report. The good doctor's clinical notes were old hat to me. ... I've had many momentary love affairs. A lot of these impromptu romances have been climaxed in a fashion not generally condoned. I go into them impulsively. I scorn any notion of their permanence. I forget the fever associated with them when a new interest presents itself."

In 1934, Bankhead had an affair with the artist Rex Whistler who, according to his biographer Anna Thomasson, lost his virginity to her at the age of 29. Offering him what Thomasson calls "an uncomplicated crash-course in sex", Bankhead's glamour and charisma appealed to the "instinctively submissive Rex". One afternoon in early 1934, Bankhead's friend David Herbert called at her suite at the Hotel Splendide in Piccadilly, only to be informed by her maid that "Miss Bankhead is in the bath with Mr Rex Whistler". Hearing Herbert's voice down the hall, Bankhead reportedly shouted, "I'm just trying to show Rex I'm definitely a blonde!"

Rumors about Bankhead's sex life have lingered for years. In the 1920s, British domestic spy agency MI5 tried to investigate allegations she had been seducing schoolboys at Eton College but the headmaster refused to cooperate.

In addition to her affairs with men, she has been linked romantically with several female personalities of the day. Bankhead was rumoured to have had affairs with a close friend and Canadian socialite Dola Dunsmuir, reasoning for her to visit Victoria, British Columbia, frequently, possibly connecting her with other women. Actress Patsy Kelly confirmed she had a sexual relationship with Bankhead when she worked for her as a personal assistant. John Gruen's Menotti: A Biography notes an incident in which Jane Bowles chased Bankhead around Capricorn, Gian Carlo Menotti and Samuel Barber's Mount Kisco estate, insisting that Bankhead needed to play the lesbian character Inès in Jean-Paul Sartre's No Exit (which Paul Bowles had recently translated). Bankhead locked herself in the bathroom and kept insisting, "That lesbian! I wouldn't know a thing about it."

Bankhead never publicly used the term "bisexual" to describe herself, preferring to use the term "ambisextrous" instead.

== Death ==
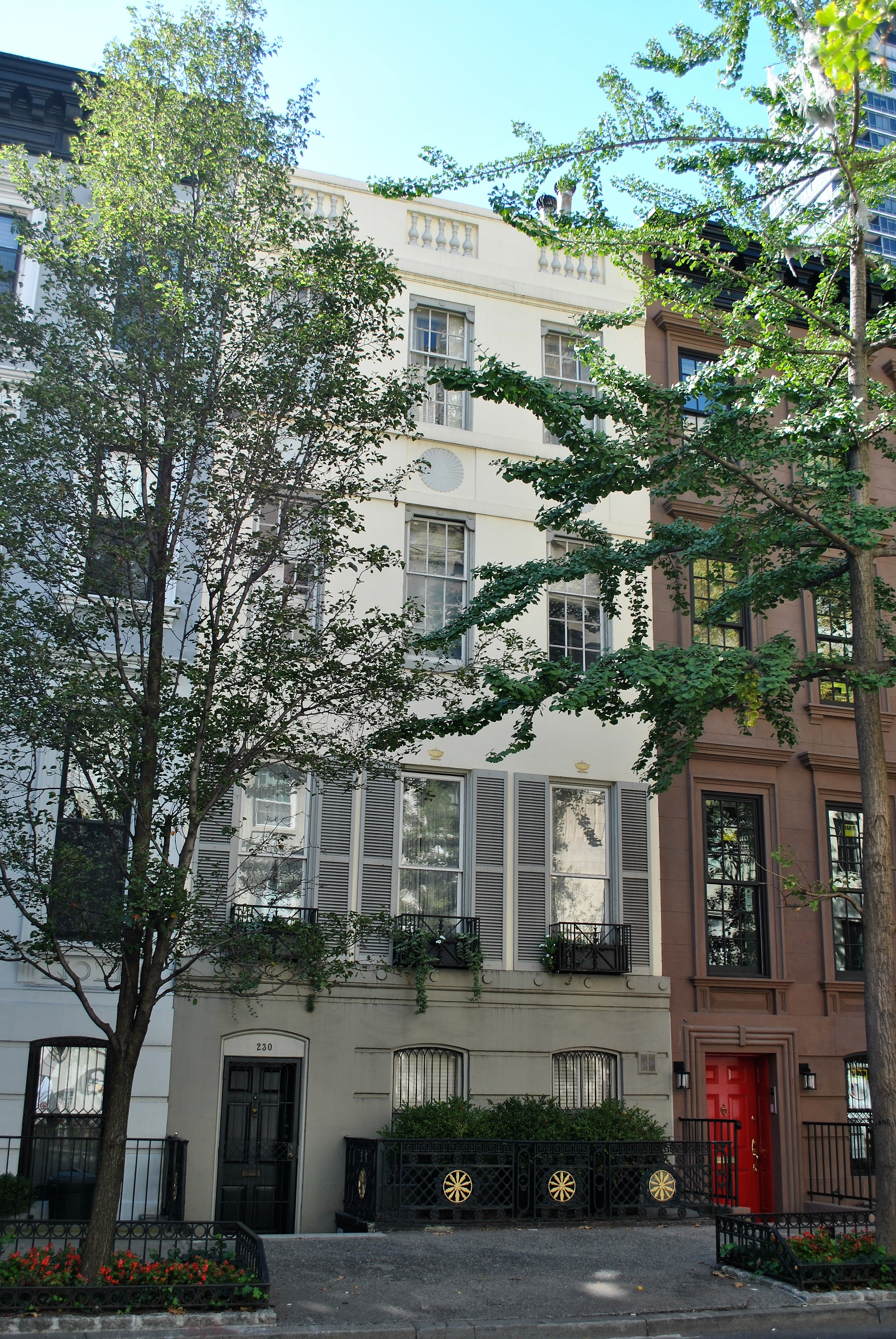
230 East 62nd Street, New York, New York

Bankhead moved into 230 East 62nd Street in the late 1950s, and then to a co-op at 333 East 57th Street.

She died at St. Luke's Hospital in Manhattan on December 12, 1968, at age 66. The cause of death was pleural double pneumonia. Her pneumonia was complicated by emphysema due to cigarette smoking and malnutrition, but it may also have been made worse by a strain of the Hong Kong flu that was endemic at that time. Her last coherent words reportedly were a garbled request for "codeine ... bourbon".

Despite claiming to be poor for much of her life, Bankhead left an estate valued at $2 million (equivalent to $18,516,746 in 2025).

On December 14, 1968, St. Paul's Episcopal Church in Chestertown, Maryland, held a private funeral. Bankhead was buried at St. Paul's cemetery. Two days later, St. Bartholomew's Episcopal Church in New York City held a memorial service for Bankhead.

== Credits ==
=== Stage ===
Date	Production	Role	Notes
March 13 – April 1918	The Squab Farm	Gladys Sinclair	
May 10 – June 1920	Footloose	Rose de Brissac	
March 2 – June 1921	Nice People	Hallie Livingston	
November 16, 1921 – January 1922	Everyday	Phyllis Nolan	
September 22 – October 1922	The Exciters	"Rufus" Rand	
1923	The Dancers	Maxine/Tawara	
1925	The Green Hat	Iris Fenwick	
1925	Scotch Mist	Mary Denvers	
1926	They Knew What They Wanted	Amy	
1926	The Gold Diggers		
1927	The Garden of Eden	Toni	
1928	Blackmail		
1928	Mud and Treacle		
1928	Her Cardboard Lover		
1930	The Lady of the Camellias		
March 1 – June 1933	Forsaking All Others	Mary Clay	
November 7 – December 1934	Dark Victory	Judith Traherne	
February 12 – March 1935	Rain	Sadie Thompson	Revival
April 29 – July 1935	Something Gay	Moncia Grey	
September 21, 1936 – January 1937	Reflected Glory	Miss Flood	
November 10, 1937	Antony and Cleopatra	Cleopatra	Revival
April 18 – June 1938	The Circle	Elizabeth	Revival
February 15, 1939 – February 3, 1940	The Little Foxes	Regina Giddens	Won: Variety Award for Best Actress of the Year
December 27, 1941 – February 7, 1942	Clash by Night	Mae Wilenski	
November 18, 1942 – September 25, 1943	The Skin of Our Teeth	Sabina	Won: New York Drama Critics Award, Variety Award for Best Actress of the Year
March 13 – June 9, 1945	Foolish Notion	Sophie Wang	
March 19 – April 12, 1947	The Eagle Has Two Heads	The Queen	
October 4, 1948 – May 7, 1949	Private Lives	Amanda Prynne	Revival
September 15, 1954 – January 29, 1955	Dear Charles	Dolores	
February 15–26, 1956	A Streetcar Named Desire	Blanche Du Bois	Revival
January 30 – February 9, 1957	Eugenia	Eugenia, Baroness Munster	
February 1–18, 1961	Midgie Purvis	Midgie Purvis	Nominated: Tony Award for Best Actress in a Play
January 1, 1964	The Milk Train Doesn't Stop Here Anymore	Mrs. Goforth	Revival

=== Filmography ===
Film
Year	Title	Role	Notes
1918	Who Loved Him Best?	Nell	Alternative title: His Inspiration
1918	When Men Betray	Alice Edwards	Uncredited; Lost film
1918	Thirty a Week	Barbara Wright	Uncredited; Lost film
1919	The Trap	Helen Carson	Alternative title (UK): A Woman's Law; Lost film
1928	His House in Order	Nina Graham	Lost film
1931	Tarnished Lady	Nancy Courtney	
1931	My Sin	Carlotta/Ann Trevor	
1931	The Cheat	Elsa Carlyle	
1932	Thunder Below	Susan	
1932	Make Me a Star	Herself	Uncredited
1932	Devil and the Deep	Diana Sturm	
1932	Faithless	Carol Morgan	
1933	Hollywood on Parade No. A-6	Herself	Short subject
1943	Stage Door Canteen	Herself	
1944	Lifeboat	Constance "Connie" Porter	New York Film Critics Circle Award for Best Actress
1945	A Royal Scandal	Catherine the Great	Alternative title: Czarina
1953	Main Street to Broadway	Herself	
1959	The Boy Who Owned a Melephant	Narrator	Short subject
1965	Fanatic	Mrs. Trefoile	Alternative title (US): Die! Die! My Darling!
1966	The Daydreamer	The Sea Witch	Voice

Television
Year	Title	Role	Notes
1952– 1953	All Star Revue	Herself	7 episodes
1953	The Buick-Berle Show	Herself	2 episodes
1954	The Colgate Comedy Hour	Herself	Episode #4.19
1954– 1962	The United States Steel Hour	Hedda Gabler	2 episodes
1955	The Martha Raye Show	Herself	1 episode
1957	Schlitz Playhouse of Stars		Episode: "The Hole Card"
1957	General Electric Theater	Katherine Belmont	Episode: "Eyes of a Stranger"
1957	The Lucy–Desi Comedy Hour	Herself	Episode: "The Celebrity Next Door"
1965	The Red Skelton Show	Mme. Fragrant	Episode: "A Jerk of All Trades"
1967	Batman	Black Widow	2 episodes

== Radio appearances ==
Year	Program	Episode/source
1934	The Rudy Vallée Show	The Affairs of Anatol
1934	Lux Radio Theatre	Let Us Be Gay
1937	Screen Directors Playhouse	Twelfth Night
1939	New York Drama Critics Circle Award Program	The Little Foxes
1942	Philip Morris Playhouse	The Little Foxes
1943	Radio Reader's Digest	The Unsinkable Mrs. Brown
1943–1944	Stage Door Canteen	Misc.
1950	Screen Directors Playhouse	Lifeboat
1950–1952	The Big Show (NBC Radio)	

== Legacy ==
Bankhead is regarded as one of the great stage actresses of the 20th century, acclaimed for her natural eloquence and dynamism. She excelled in both serious and comedic roles, and for over two decades, she was among the most celebrated actresses in Broadway or London's West End, praised in the superlative "perhaps the greatest actress this country has ever produced". For the most part, Bankhead was lauded even in her failed vehicles, and she was considered by critics to be a rare and unique talent. At the height of her career, she was a "living legend", Broadway's most original leading lady. Her eccentric personality was an asset to her career rather than a hindrance, but as years of hard living took their toll, her highly publicized and often scandalous private life began to undermine her reputation. Obituaries on her death reflected on how far she had fallen from her former grandeur, à la John Barrymore. The critic Brooks Atkinson was more candid: "Since Miss Bankhead lived as she wanted to, there is no point in deploring the loss of a talented actress". However, the legend which had ruined her career made her an enormously popular icon in both the theatrical and especially the gay community. Decades of sustained interest in Bankhead eventually realized itself in a renewed appreciation for her body of work.

=== Awards and honors ===
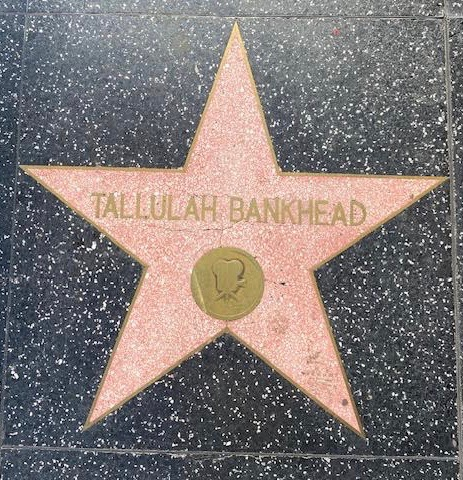
Bankhead's star on the Hollywood Walk of Fame.

Among Bankhead's awards were a New York Drama Critics Award for Best Performance by an actress in The Skin of Our Teeth in 1942, as well as a Variety award in The Little Foxes and Skin. She was nominated for a Tony award for her performance in Midgie Purvis, and won the New York Film Critics Award for Best Actress in a Film for her work in Lifeboat. Bankhead was the first white woman to be featured on the cover of Ebony magazine, and was one of the very few actresses and the only stage actress to have a cover on both Time and Life. In 1928, she was honored as one of the 10 most remarkable women in London. A resolution honoring her achievements was passed in the Alabama Legislature. For her contribution to the motion picture industry, Bankhead has a star on the Hollywood Walk of Fame at 6141 Hollywood Blvd. Bankhead was (posthumously) one of the original members of the American Theater Hall of Fame inducted upon its establishment in 1972.

Year	Award	Nominated work	Result
1928	Ten Most Remarkable Women In London	–	Won
1939	Variety Award for Best Actress of the Year	The Little Foxes	Won
1942	New York Drama Critics Award for Best Actress in a Production	The Skin of Our Teeth	Won
1942	Variety Award for Best Actress of the Year	The Skin of Our Teeth	Won
1944	New York Film Critics Circle Award for Best Actress	Lifeboat	Won
1950	Radio's Woman of the Year	The Big Show	Won
1960	Star on the Hollywood Walk of Fame at 6141 Hollywood Blvd	Motion pictures	Inducted
1961	Tony Award for Best Actress in a Play	Midgie Purvis	Nominated
1972	American Theater Hall of Fame	Lifetime achievement	Won

=== In theatre ===
Bankhead earned her greatest acclaim for two classic roles she originated: Regina in Lillian Hellman's The Little Foxes and Sabina in Thornton Wilder's The Skin of our Teeth.

At the Algonquin Hotel, Bankhead left prominent impressions upon playwrights such as Zoe Akins and Rachel Crothers. Crothers later wrote the play Everyday for Bankhead, and Akins patterned the character of Eva Lovelace in her play Morning Glory on Bankhead. She became good friends with Tennessee Williams, who was immediately struck upon meeting her, describing her as "result[ing] from the fantastic crossbreeding of a moth and a tiger". Williams wrote four female roles for her, Myra Torrance in Battle of Angels, Blanche DuBois in A Streetcar Named Desire, Princess Kosmonopolis in Sweet Bird of Youth, and Flora Goforth in The Milk Train Doesn't Stop Here Anymore.

A song in the 1937 musical I'd Rather Be Right, "Off the Record", contains the line "I'm not so fond of Bankhead, but I'd love to meet Tallulah".

Looped is a Broadway play by New York writer Matthew Lombardo inspired by an incident which occurred during Bankhead’s last movie role, playing a religious fanatic in the 1965 horror film Die! Die! My Darling!. It has been chosen as the debut production of the theatre company based at Holden Street Theatres in Adelaide, South Australia, on 2 May 2023.

=== In art ===
A collection of 50 portraits of Bankhead in her London years is housed in the United Kingdom's National Portrait Gallery. Augustus John painted a portrait of Bankhead in 1929 which is considered one of his greatest pieces. Frank Dobson also sculpted a bust of Bankhead during her London period. The Library of Congress houses numerous works of Bankhead.

=== Biographies ===
Many books have been written about Bankhead's life. In chronological order, they are:

- Bankhead, Tallulah. Tallulah: My Autobiography. Harper & Bros., 1952.
- Gill, Brendan. Tallulah. Holt, London: Rinehart & Winston, 1972.
- Israel, Lee. Miss Tallulah Bankhead. New York: Putnam Pub Group, 1972.
- Tunney, Kieran. Tallulah: Darling of the Gods. New York: Dutton, 1973.
- Rawls, Eugenia. Tallulah, A Memory. University of Alabama Press, 1979.
- Brian, Denis. Tallulah, Darling: A Biography of Tallulah Bankhead. New York: Macmillan, 1980.
- Patrick, Pamela Cowie. Tallulah Bankhead: The Darling of the Theater. Huntsville: Writers Consortium Books, 1989.
- Carrier, Jeffrey. Tallulah Bankhead, A Bio-Bibliography. New York: Greenwood Press, 1991.
- Bret, David. Tallulah Bankhead: A Scandalous Life. New York: Robson Books/Parkwest, 1997.
- Lavery, Bryony. Tallulah Bankhead. Bath: Absolute Press, 1999.
- Archibald, Alecia Sherard. Tallulah Bankhead: Alabama's Bad Girl Star. Alabama: Seacoast Publishing, Inc., 2003
- Lobenthal, Joel. Tallulah!: The Life and times of a Leading Lady. New York: HarperCollins, 2004.

=== Tributes ===
A Tallulah Bankhead Tribute was held by the Walker County Arts Alliance in her hometown of Jasper, Alabama, on June 11–15, 2015. A similar tribute was held for a week at the University of Alabama in Birmingham in November 1977.

== In popular culture ==
Bankhead remains relevant in American culture despite modern audiences being unfamiliar with the stage performances for which she was most acclaimed.

Due to her personality and often self-destructive behavior, she has become a frequently imitated camp icon.

Many critics (and Bankhead herself) compared the characterization of Margo Channing in All About Eve to that of Bankhead.

Bankhead's voice and personality inspired voice actress Betty Lou Gerson's work on the character Cruella De Vil in Walt Disney Pictures' One Hundred and One Dalmatians, which the studio calls "a manic take-off on famous actress Tallulah Bankhead".
