= Tenderloin (musical) =

1960 American musical

- Original Cast Recording
- Music: Jerry Bock
- Lyrics: Sheldon Harnick
- Book: George Abbott and Jerome Weidman
- Basis: 1959 novel by Samuel Hopkins Adams, Tenderloin
- Productions: 1960 Broadway; 2000 Broadway concert

Tenderloin is a musical with a book by George Abbott and Jerome Weidman, lyrics by Sheldon Harnick, and music by Jerry Bock, their follow-up to the highly successful Pulitzer Prize-winning Fiorello! a year earlier. The musical is based on a 1959 novel by Samuel Hopkins Adams. Set in the Tenderloin, a red-light district in 1890s Manhattan, the show's story focuses on Reverend Brock, a character loosely based on American clergyman and social reformer Charles Henry Parkhurst.

== Productions ==
After six previews, the Broadway production, directed by Abbott and choreographed by Joe Layton, opened on October 17, 1960, at the 46th Street Theatre, where it ran for 216 performances. The cast included Maurice Evans (better known as a Shakespearean actor than a musical performer) as Reverend Brock and Ron Husmann as Tommy.

Tony Award nominations went to Evans for Best Actor in a Musical, Husmann for Best Featured Actor in a Musical, and Cecil Beaton for Best Costume Design in a Musical, and Husmann won the Theatre World Award for his performance.

An original cast recording was released by Capitol Records, and Bobby Darin's recording of "Artificial Flowers" reached #20 on the Billboard charts.

The musical was produced in New York City Center's Encores! staged concert series in March 2000, directed by Walter Bobbie and choreographed by Rob Ashford. The cast included David Ogden Stiers (Brock), Debbie Gravitte (Nita), Tom Alan Robbins (Joe), Patrick Wilson (Tommy), Sarah Uriarte Berry (Laura), Kevin Conway (Lt. Schmidt), and Jessica Stone (Margie).

A concert cast recording was released by DRG Records.

== Synopsis ==
Reverend Brock, a single-minded 1890s social reformer works to sanitize the Tenderloin, a red-light neighborhood in western Manhattan. He is foiled by everyone associated with the district, including the corrupt politicians and police who are taking their cut from the earnings of the prostitutes who work the streets there. Tommy Howatt, a writer for the local scandal sheet Tatler, infiltrates the minister's church and proceeds to play one side against the other, eventually framing Brock by revealing to the authorities his plan to raid the brothels, but ultimately saving him by siding with him at his trial. As a result, the Tenderloin is shut down and Brock, asked to resign from his church, heads for Detroit with the hope of succeeding there as well.

== Songs ==
Act I

- Bless This Land – Chorus
- Little Old New York – Nita, Gertie, Girls, All
- Dr. Brock – Brock
- Artificial Flowers – Tommy, Jessica, All
- What's in it for You? – Tommy, Brock
- Reform – Girls
- Tommy, Tommy – Laura
- The Picture of Happiness – Tommy, Margie, Chorus
- My Miss Mary – Company
- Dear Friend – Brock, Group
- The Army of The Just – Martin, Tommy, Brock, Men
- How the Money Changes Hands – Company

Act II

- Good Clean Fun – Brock, Chorus
- My Miss Mary – Tommy, Laura, Chorus
- My Gentle Young Johnny – Nita
- The Trial – Company
- The Tenderloin Celebration – Frye, Gertie, Company
- Reform (Reprise) – Liz, Nellie, Margie, Girls
- Tommy, Tommy (Reprise) – Laura
- Little Old New York (Reprise) – Company

== Characters ==
- Reverend Brock – an idealistic old preacher
- Tommy Howatt – an ambitious young reporter
- Laura Crosbie – a society girl who falls for Tommy
- Ellington Dupont Smythe II – Laura's elegant young suitor
- Purdy – Laura's wealthy uncle
- Bridget – Purdy's maid
- Frye – a detective
- Gertie – a vivacious young prostitute
- Joe Kovack – a farmer who discovered coal on his land
- Nita – escapes prostitution when she falls in love with Joe
- Margie – one of the girls Tommy shares a musical act with
- Jessica Havemeyer – clerk at the church Parish House
- Martin – a prudish church choirmaster
- Mrs. Barker – a church lady and friend of Rev. Brock
- Chairman – officiates over the trial of the Tenderloin
- Deacon – an old man who Tommy hires to take pictures
- Rooney – a police officer
- Sergeant – collects the money all the derelicts give the police
- Schmidt – a corrupt police lieutenant
- Derelicts; Prostitutes at Clark's tavern (Pearl, Maggie, Nellie, Liz)

== Casts ==
	Broadway (1960)	Las Vegas (1961)	Encores! (2000)
Reverend Brock	Maurice Evans	John Alexander	David Ogden Stiers
Tommy Howatt	Ron Husmann		Patrick Wilson
Laura Crosbie	Wynne Miller	Irene Kane	Sarah Uriarte Berry
Nita	Eileen Rodgers	Nancy Emes	Debbie Gravitte
Margie	Margery Gray		Jessica Stone
Liz	Christine Norden		Sara Gettelfinger
Joe Kovack	Rex Everhart		Tom Alan Robbins
Frye	Eddie Phillips		Bruce MacVittie
Gertie	Lee Becker	Marjorie Pragon	Yvette Cason
Lt. Schmidt	Ralph Dunn		Kevin Conway
Jessica Havemeyer	Irene Kane		Melissa Rain Anderson

== Background ==
William and James Goldman were called in to doctor the show. "We'd been writing those other things and somebody must have read it and liked it and we were probably cheap and they asked us to do it," recalls William Goldman. Goldman also said the writer they replaced would not leave the project. "It was terrifying."
