= Brockman Seawell =

American television producer

Brock Seawell is an American producer of plays, television programs and feature films.

== Education and career ==
Brock Seawell graduated from the London Academy of Music and Dramatic Art.

His theater producing credits include 1933 which he adapted from the John Fante novella 1933 Was a Bad Year. He received a Tony Award nomination for the Broadway musical Quilters. In 1982, he also produced a New York City stage adaptation of the BBC TV-movie The Arcata Promise by David Mercer.

Seawell was executive producer of No Bigger Than a Minute, a documentary on dwarfism, which aired on the US public television network PBS under the umbrella series POV. It won a 2006 CINE Golden Eagle Award. He wrote and produced the feature film Top of the World and produced the telefilm Land of Little Rain, starring Helen Hunt, for the PBS anthology American Playhouse. He additionally produced The Shakespeare Sessions, directed by Oren Jacoby and John Barton, for PBS in 2003, and the 2008 television documentary When I Hear Thunder, about four young Native American boxers, which was nominated for a Heartland Emmy in 2008.

Seawell was president of the Helen G. Bonfils Foundation, supporting the Denver Center for the Performing Arts, for more than ten years. He then became a governor of the Royal Shakespeare Company. He is married to Mary Wallach.
