= Midgie Purvis =

1961 Broadway play by Mary Chase

- Written by: Mary Chase
- Original language: English
- Genre: Comedy
- Setting: A midwestern American city. The time is the present.

Premiere
- Date premiered: February 1, 1961
- Place premiered: Martin Beck Theatre

Midgie Purvis is a comedic stage play written by American playwright Mary Chase. The show premiered on Broadway in 1961 and starred Tallulah Bankhead as the titular character. For her performance, Bankhead was nominated for the Tony Award for Best Actress in a Play. The play tells the story of a socialite who becomes bored with her life and decides to go to work as a nanny, altering her outlook on life in the process.

== Original cast and characters ==
Character	Original Broadway cast (1961)
Midgie Purvis	Tallulah Bankhead
Edwin Gilroy Purvis	Russell Hardie
Canfield Purvis	William Redfield
Dr. Monroe Sidensticker	Clinton Sundberg
Dorothy Plunkett	Alice Pearce
Luther Plunkett	John Cecil Holm
Mother	Kip McArdle
Althea Malone	Nydia Westman
Emma Pasternack	Jane Van Duser
Cleo June	Pia Zadora

== Production history ==
The play had an out-of-town tryout at the National Theatre in Washington D.C in January 1961 prior to transferring to Broadway. Mary Chase had continued re-writing the script and several cast from the tryout changed prior to moving to Broadway. The show was meant to be an Auntie Mame style star vehicle for Bankhead. The show opened on Broadway on February 1, 1961 and closed on February 18, 1961 after 21 performances at the Martin Beck Theatre. The show was directed by Burgess Meredith and had scenic design by Ben Edwards. The show is notable for being a return to Broadway for stage legend Tallulah Bankhead, earning her only Tony Award nomination for her performance as the title character in a rare comedic performance.

The play is available for licensing by Dramatists Play Service
