= List of awards and nominations received by Cynthia Nixon =

Cynthia Nixon awards and nominations
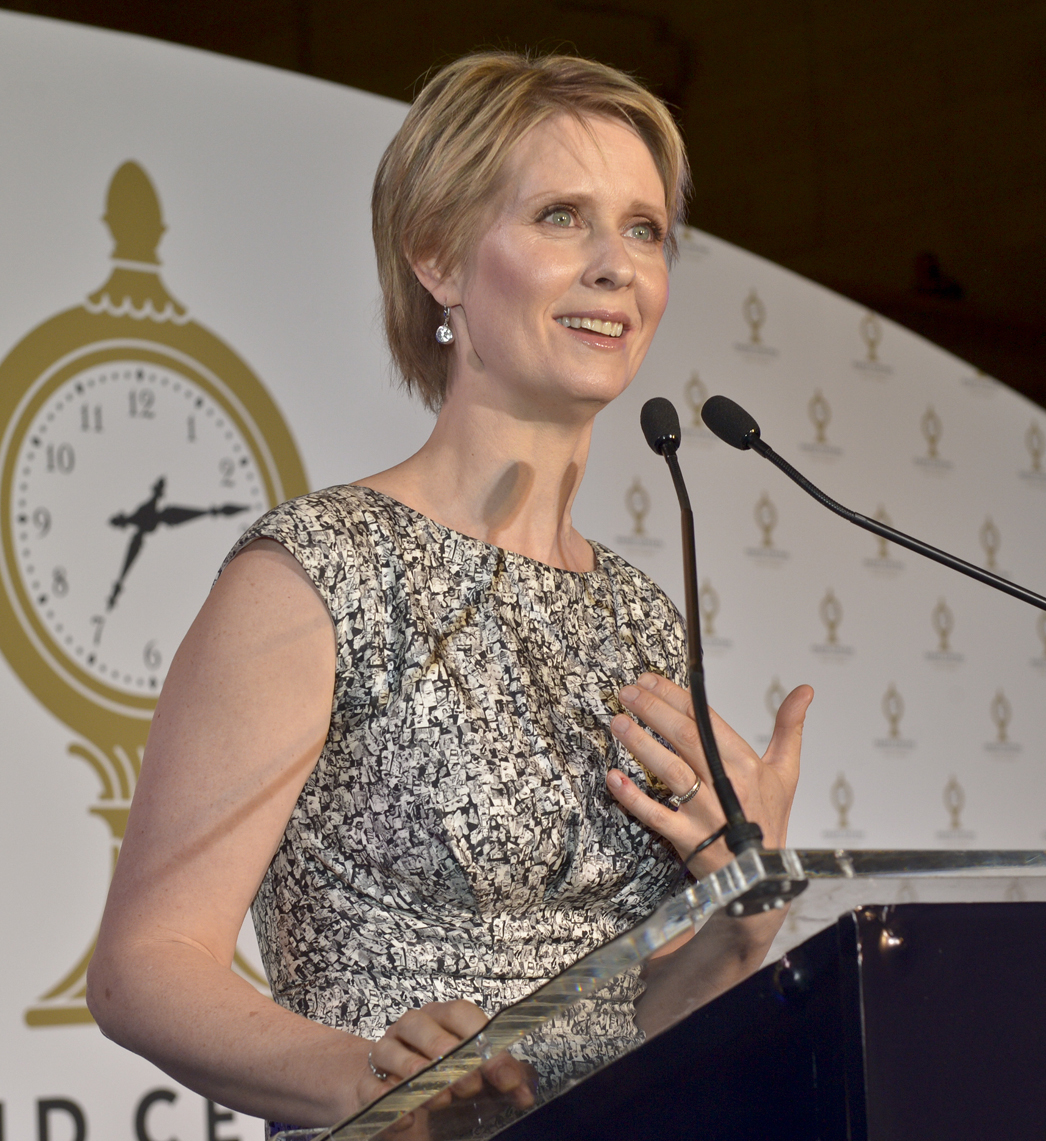
- Nixon in 2013
Awards and nominations
Award	Wins	Nominations
Critics' Choice	0	2
Emmy Awards	2	5
Golden Globes	0	6
Grammy Awards	1	1
SAG Awards	2	7
Tony Awards	2	4

Totals (Note: Certain award groups do not simply award one winner. They acknowledge several different recipients, have runners-up, and have third place. Since this is a specific recognition and is different from losing an award, runner-up mentions are considered wins in this award tally. For simplification and to avoid errors, each award in this list has been presumed to have had a prior nomination.)
- Wins: 17
- Nominations: 86

Cynthia Nixon, known for her varied roles on film, television and theater, has won various accolades including two Primetime Emmy Awards, a Grammy Award, two Screen Actors Guild Awards, and two Tony Awards as well as nominations for two Critics' Choice Television Awards, six Golden Globe Awards, and an Independent Spirit Award.

For her portrayal of Miranda Hobbes in the HBO series Sex and the City (1998–2004), she won the Primetime Emmy Award for Outstanding Supporting Actress in a Comedy Series and reprised the role in the films Sex and the City (2008) and Sex and the City 2 (2010), as well as the television show And Just Like That... (2021–2025). She won the Primetime Emmy Award for Outstanding Guest Actress in a Drama Series for Law & Order: Special Victims Unit in 2008 and a Grammy Award for Best Spoken Word Album for An Inconvenient Truth in 2009.

Nixon also received two Tony Awards, the first for the Best Actress in a Play for playing a greiving mother in the David Lindsay-Abaire play Rabbit Hole (2006) and for Best Featured Actress in a Play for playing an alcoholic wife in the revival of the Lillian Hellman play The Little Foxes (2017). Her other Broadway credits include the Tom Stoppard play The Real Thing (1983), the David Rabe play Hurlyburly (1983), the Jean Cocteau play Indiscretions (1995), the Clare Boothe Luce play The Women (2001), and the Margaret Edson play Wit (2012).

== Major associations ==
=== Critics' Choice Awards ===
Year	Category	Nominated work	Result	Ref.
Critics' Choice Television Awards
2015	Best Supporting Actress in a Movie/Miniseries	Stockholm, Pennsylvania	Nominated	
2016	Best Actress in a Movie/Miniseries	Killing Reagan	Nominated	

=== Emmy Awards ===
Year	Category	Nominated work	Result	Ref.
Primetime Emmy Awards
2002	Outstanding Supporting Actress in a Comedy Series	Sex and the City (episode: "My Motherboard, My Self" + "Change of a Dress")	Nominated	
2003	Outstanding Supporting Actress in a Comedy Series	Sex and the City (episode: "Anchors Away" + "Cover Girl")	Nominated	
2004	Outstanding Supporting Actress in a Comedy Series	Sex and the City (episode: "One" + "The Ick Factor")	Won	
2005	Outstanding Lead Actress in a Miniseries or a Movie	Warm Springs	Nominated	
2008	Outstanding Guest Actress in a Drama Series	Law & Order: Special Victims Unit (episode: "Alternate")	Won	

=== Golden Globe Award ===
Year	Category	Nominated work	Result	Ref.
2000	Best Supporting Actress in a Series, Miniseries or TV Film	Sex and the City	Nominated	
2001	Best Supporting Actress in a Series, Miniseries or TV Film	Sex and the City	Nominated	
2003	Best Supporting Actress in a Series, Miniseries or TV Film	Sex and the City	Nominated	
2004	Best Supporting Actress in a Series, Miniseries or TV Film	Sex and the City	Nominated	
2006	Best Actress in a Miniseries or TV Film	Warm Springs	Nominated	
2021	Best Supporting Actress in a Series, Miniseries or TV Film	Ratched	Nominated	

=== Grammy Awards ===
Year	Category	Nominated work	Result	Ref.
2009	Best Spoken Word Album	An Inconvenient Truth	Won	

=== Screen Actors Guild Awards ===
Year	Category	Nominated work	Result	Ref.
2000	Outstanding Ensemble in a Comedy Series	Sex and the City	Nominated	
2001	Outstanding Ensemble in a Comedy Series	Sex and the City	Won	
2002	Outstanding Ensemble in a Comedy Series	Sex and the City	Nominated	
2003	Outstanding Ensemble in a Comedy Series	Sex and the City	Won	
2004	Outstanding Ensemble in a Comedy Series	Sex and the City	Nominated	
2005	Outstanding Female Actor in a Miniseries or Television Movie	Warm Springs	Nominated	
2023	Outstanding Ensemble in a Drama Series	The Gilded Age	Nominated	

=== Tony Awards ===
Year	Category	Nominated work	Result	Ref.
1995	Best Featured Actress in a Play	Indiscretions	Nominated	
2006	Best Actress in a Play	Rabbit Hole	Won	
2012	Best Actress in a Play	Wit	Nominated	
2017	Best Featured Actress in a Play	The Little Foxes	Won	

== Miscellaneous awards ==
Organizations	Year	Category	Nominated work	Result	Ref.
AARP Movies for Grownups Awards	2016	Best Supporting Actress	James White	Nominated	
Chicago Film Critics Association	2015	Best Supporting Actress	James White	Nominated	
Chlotrudis Awards	2016	Best Supporting Actress	James White	Won	
Detroit Film Critics Society	2015	Best Supporting Actress	James White	Nominated	
Dorian Award	2026	Outstanding Featured Performance in a Broadway Play	Marjorie Prime	Nominated	
Drama Desk Award	2017	Outstanding Featured Actress in a Play	The Little Foxes	Won	
FilmOut San Diego	2010	Best Supporting Actress	An Englishman in New York	Won	
Florida Film Critics Circle	2017	Best Actress	A Quiet Passion	Nominated	
Gold Derby Awards	2004	Comedy Supporting Actress	Sex and the City	Nominated	
Gold Derby Awards	2005	Television Movie/Miniseries Lead Actress	Warm Springs	Nominated	
Gold Derby Awards	2005	Drama Guest Actress	ER	Nominated	
Gold Derby Awards	2008	Drama Guest Actress	Law & Order: Special Victims Unit	Won	
Gold Derby Awards	2011	TV Movie/Miniseries Supporting Actress	Too Big to Fail	Nominated	
Gold Derby Awards	2012	Comedy Guest Actress	The Big C	Nominated	
Golden Raspberry Awards	2011	Worst Actress (shared with Sarah Jessica Parker, Kim Cattrall and Kristin Davis)	Sex and the City 2	Won	
Gracie Allen Awards	2016	Outstanding Female Actor in a Supporting Role – Drama	Stockholm, Pennsylvania	Won	
Independent Spirit Awards	2015	Best Supporting Female	James White	Nominated	
International Cinephile Society Awards	2016	Best Supporting Actress	James White	Nominated	
International Cinephile Society Awards	2018	Best Actress	A Quiet Passion	Nominated	
International Online Cinema Awards	2016	Best Supporting Actress	James White	Nominated	
International Online Cinema Awards	2017	Best Actress	A Quiet Passion	Nominated	
National Society of Film Critics	2018	Best Actress	A Quiet Passion	Nominated	
OFTA Television Awards	2000	Best Ensemble in a Comedy Series	Sex and the City	Nominated	
OFTA Television Awards	2002	Best Ensemble in a Comedy Series	Sex and the City	Nominated	
OFTA Television Awards	2002	Best Supporting Actress in a Comedy Series	Sex and the City	Won	
OFTA Television Awards	2004	Best Supporting Actress in a Comedy Series	Sex and the City	Nominated	
OFTA Television Awards	2004	Best Ensemble in a Comedy Series	Sex and the City	Nominated	
OFTA Television Awards	2005	Best Actress in a Motion Picture or Miniseries	Warm Springs	Nominated	
Online Film Critics Society Awards	2015	Best Supporting Actress	James White	Nominated	
Online Film Critics Society Awards	2017	Best Actress	A Quiet Passion	Nominated	
People's Choice Awards	2009	Favorite Cast (shared with Sarah Jessica Parker, Kim Cattrall, Kristin Davis and Chris Noth)	Sex and the City	Nominated	
Satellite Awards	2003	Best Supporting Actress in a Series — Comedy or Musical	Sex and the City	Nominated	
Satellite Awards	2005	Best Actress in a Miniseries or Motion Picture Made for Television	Warm Springs	Nominated	
Satellite Awards	2015	Best Actress in a Miniseries or Motion Picture Made for Television	Stockholm, Pennsylvania	Nominated	
Satellite Awards	2023	Best Supporting Actress – Series, Miniseries or Television Film	The Gilded Age	Nominated	
ShoWest Convention Awards	2010	Ensemble Award (shared with Sarah Jessica Parker, Kim Cattrall and Kristin Davis)	Sex and the City 2	Won	
Theatre World Awards	1981	Outstanding Individual	The Philadelphia Story	Won	
TV Land Awards	2007	Most Beautiful Braces	Sex and the City	Nominated	
Village Voice Film Poll	2015	Best Supporting Actress	James White	Nominated	
Village Voice Film Poll	2017	Best Lead Performance	A Quiet Passion	Nominated	
Women Film Critics Circle	2017	Best Actress	A Quiet Passion	Nominated	
Women Film Critics Circle	2017	Invisible Woman Award	A Quiet Passion	Nominated	
Women in Film Crystal + Lucy Awards	1999	Lucy Award (shared with Sarah Jessica Parker, Kim Cattrall and Kristin Davis)	Sex and the City	Won	
Young Artist Awards	1987	Best Young Actress in a Supporting Role in a Feature Film — Comedy, Fantasy or Drama	The Manhattan Project	Nominated	

== Honorary awards ==
- 2008: Received the Muse Award presented by the New York Women in Film & Television.
- 2010: Received the Vito Russo Award presented by the GLAAD Media Awards.
- 2013: Received the Yale University Artist for Equality award in 2013
- 2016: Received the Faith Hubley Memorial Award during the Provincetown International Film Festival.
