= Eugenia Rawls =

American actress

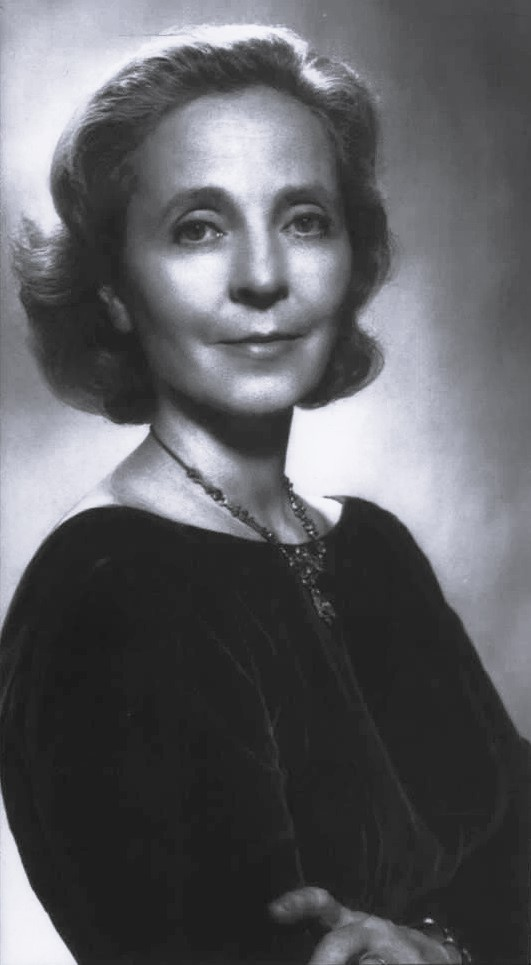
- Rawls in 1971
- Born: Mary Eugina Rawls; September 11, 1913; Macon, Georgia
- Died: November 8, 2000 (aged 87); Denver, Colorado
- Occupation: Actress
- Years active: 1934–60; 1975–76
- Notable work: The Little Foxes (1939)
- Spouse: Donald Seawell (m. 1941)

Mary Eugenia Rawls (September 11, 1913 — November 8, 2000) was an American actress.

== Biography ==
Rawls was born in Macon, Georgia on September 11, 1913, and lived with her grandmother and two aunts for most of her early life. She made her stage debut at age 4 in a local production of Madame Butterfly and later attended Wesleyan College in Macon.

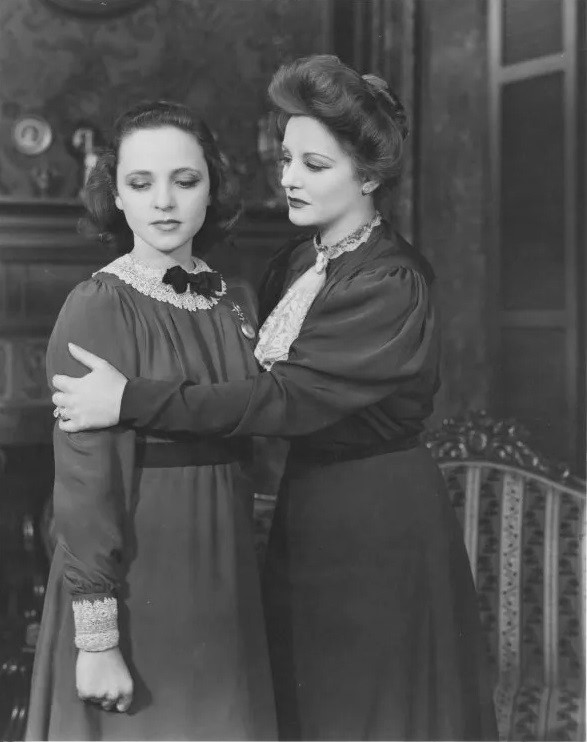
Rawls (left) and Tallulah Bankhead in The Little Foxes, 1939

She moved to New York City and made her Broadway debut in 1934 as Peggy Rogers in Lillian Hellman's The Children's Hour. Her best-known role came in 1939 as Tallulah Bankhead's character Regina Gidden's daughter, Alexandra, in The Little Foxes. She replaced the original actress on Broadway, and performed with Bankhead, who would become her lifelong mentor, when the show toured the US. She performed in several Broadway plays through 1956, and appeared in many New York-based television shows in the 1950s and 1960s, including a recurring role on As the World Turns and portraying Margaret on the ABC serial Road to Reality (1960). She created several one-woman shows, which she played in regional theaters, Great Britain, and the John F. Kennedy Center for the Performing Arts. Her book, Tallulah, A Memory was a memoir of her friend's outrageous life. Rawls also wrote and performed in Women of The West and Affectionally Yours, Fanny Kemble.

After nearly two decades, she returned to Broadway for one more production, playing Aunt Nonnie in a December 1975 to February 1976 revival of Tennessee Williams Sweet Bird of Youth.

She died November 8, 2000, in Denver, Colorado, aged 87.

== Personal life ==
Rawls married Donald Seawell, an attorney and the founder and chairman of the Denver Center for the Performing Arts in 1941. Bankhead, the matron of honor at Rawls' wedding, was the godmother of their two children, one of whom, Brockman Seawell, became a stage, television and film producer.

== Bibliography ==
- Tallulah, a Memory, University of Alabama Press, 1979.
- A Moment Ago, Denver Center for the Performing Arts Press, 1984.
