= Donald Seawell =

American publisher (1912–2015)

- Born: Donald Ray Seawell; August 1, 1912
- Died: September 30, 2015 (aged 103)
- Education: University of North Carolina; University of North Carolina School of Law
- Occupations: Civic leader, cultural leader
- Spouse: Eugenia Rawls (m. 1941)
- Father: Aaron A. F. Seawell
- Relatives: Malcolm Buie Seawell (brother); Buie Seawell (nephew)

Donald Ray Seawell (August 1, 1912 – September 30, 2015) was an American cultural and civic leader, born in Jonesboro, North Carolina. He was the founder of the Denver Center for the Performing Arts.

== Early and personal life ==
Seawell was born on August 1, 1912 to Aaron A. F. Seawell, a justice of the North Carolina Supreme Court. Donald graduated from the University of North Carolina, and UNC Law School. In 1941, he married Broadway actress Eugenia Rawls, who played Tallulah Bankhead's daughter in The Little Foxes. They had two children. In August 2012, Seawell turned 100.

== Career ==
Seawell was hired to work at the Securities and Exchange Commission by the newly appointed head of the organization, Joseph P. Kennedy. Kennedy had heard Seawell's unflattering comment about him on the radio, where the young lawyer said, "It takes a thief to catch a thief". This quote is widely attributed to Franklin Delano Roosevelt who knew Joseph Kennedy personally and appointed him to the SEC citing this reason. He was impressed by Seawell's candor, if not his character assessment, and wanted him on his team. During World War II, Seawell worked on General Dwight D. Eisenhower's SHAEF staff in counterintelligence. After the war, he served briefly as assistant Ambassador to France.

Entering private law practice in New York City, he gathered many theatrical clients including, Tallulah Bankhead, Alfred Lunt and Lynn Fontanne. He also maintained law offices in London and Tel Aviv, and was involved in writing the charter for the State of Israel. Seawell's theatrical clients led to his becoming a Broadway producer, and his shows included: Noël Coward's Sail Away, The Affair, and A Thurber Carnival. He was the first producer to bring the Royal Shakespeare Company (RSC) to the United States in a 1962 production of The Hollow Crown. He later became a governor of the RSC as well as chairman of the American National Theatre and Academy. In 2002, he was awarded the honorary title, Order of the British Empire, by Queen Elizabeth II.

Seawell was one of three producers of Bonard Productions, the others being the actress Haila Stoddard, and The Denver Post owner Helen Bonfils. In the 1960s, he joined forces with Ms. Bonfils to become secretary-treasurer of the Denver Post. After Helen Bonfils' death, he became publisher of the paper. Using funds from the Bonfils Foundation, he created The Denver Center for the Performing Arts in the late 1970s. He retired as active chairman of the center in 2007 at the age of 94.

== Awards ==
- B'nai B'rith Anti-Defamation League Heritage Award 1973
- Distinguished Eagle Award, Boy Scouts of America 1976
- Tony Award 1983
- Arts & Entertainment Cable Network Award 1987
- Third Millennium Leadership Award, American Diabetes Association 1995
- Colorado Tourism Hall of Fame Award 1999
- Mayor's Millennium Award 2000
- In 2002, Queen Elizabeth awarded Donald Seawell The Order of the British Empire.
- Colorado Festival of World Theatre Donald Seawell Award recipient 2005
- In 2005, he became the 11th recipient of the National Theatre Hall of Fame's Founder's Award
- Mayor's 2007 Cultural Legacy Award, Denver
