= Outside of Paradise =

1938 film by John H. Auer

- Theatrical release poster
- Directed by: John H. Auer
- Screenplay by: Harry Sauber
- Produced by: Harry Sauber
- Starring: Phil Regan; Penny Singleton; Bert Gordon; Leonid Kinskey; Ruth Coleman; Mary Forbes
- Cinematography: Jack A. Marta
- Edited by: Ernest J. Nims
- Music by: Alberto Colombo
- Production company: Republic Pictures
- Distributed by: Republic Pictures
- Release date: February 7, 1938
- Running time: 68 minutes
- Country: United States
- Language: English

Outside of Paradise is a 1938 American comedy film directed by John H. Auer and written by Harry Sauber. The film stars Phil Regan, Penny Singleton, Bert Gordon, Leonid Kinskey, Ruth Coleman and Mary Forbes. The film was released on February 7, 1938, by Republic Pictures.

== Cast ==
- Phil Regan as Daniel 'Danny' Francis O'Toole
- Penny Singleton as Colleen Kerrigan
- Bert Gordon as Mischa
- Leonid Kinskey as Cafe Owner Ivan Petrovich
- Ruth Coleman as Dorothy Stonewall
- Mary Forbes as Mrs. Stonewall
- Lionel Pape as Mr. Stonewall
- Ralph Remley as Timothy
- Renie Riano as Ellen
- Peter Lind Hayes as Lind
- Joe E. Marks as Bass
- David Kerman as Felix
- Billy Young as Johnny
- Cliff Nazarro as Cliff
- Harry Allen as Old Man
- Gloria Rich as Singer
