= Bert Gordon (comedian) =

American comedian and voice actor

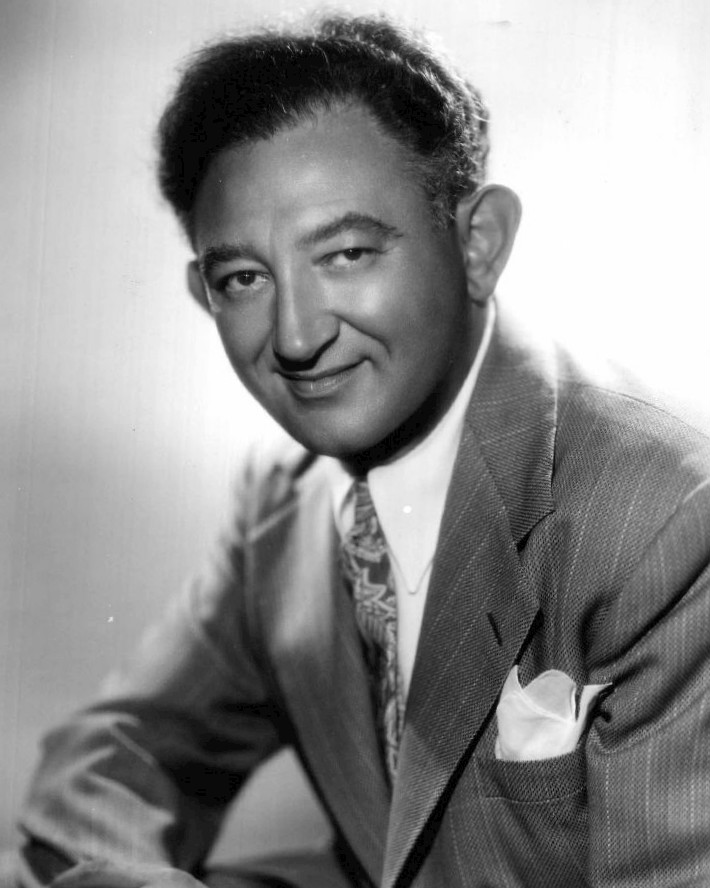
- Gordon in 1945
- Born: Barney Gorodetsky; April 8, 1895; Manhattan, New York, U.S.
- Died: November 30, 1974 (aged 79); Duarte, California, U.S.
- Other name: "The Mad Russian"
- Occupations: comedian voice actor

Bert Gordon (born Barney Gorodetsky; April 8, 1895 – November 30, 1974) was an American comedian and voice actor who appeared in vaudeville, radio, and occasionally films.

== Life and career ==
Barney Gorodetsky was born in Manhattan. In the early part of his career he performed in School Days sketches with Gus Edwards' troupe, and in a comedy group called Nine Crazy Kids. His big break came in 1930, when performing in the George and Ira Gershwin musical Girl Crazy in New York. When actor Gregory Ratoff bought the rights to the show and gave up performing, Gordon took his role as the "Mad Russian".

From 1935 he was a regular on The Eddie Cantor Program, and later Camel Caravan, maintaining his "Mad Russian" character. He also appeared on The Jack Benny Program, and The Abbott and Costello Program. In 1945 he starred in his own film vehicle, How Doooo You Do!!!, directed by Ralph Murphy; the film takes its title from Gordon's distinctive way of introducing himself, which became a catch phrase in the early 1940s. Gordon also appeared in films including New Faces of 1937, Outside of Paradise (1941) and Sing for Your Supper (1941).

After the end of the Second World War, and start of the Cold War, western audiences did not appreciate fake Russian characters, and Gordon's popularity diminished. Finally, Gordon played himself in an episode of The Dick Van Dyke Show in 1964 along with several other radio-era performers.

Gordon was married to Edna Wheaton, a Ziegfeld Follies performer, from 1924 until their divorce in 1936. He died in California in 1974 at the age of 79.

== Filmography ==
- Madison Square Garden (1932)
- She Gets Her Man (1935)
- The Affair of Susan (1935)
- New Faces of 1937 (1937)
- Outside of Paradise (1938)
- Sing for Your Supper (1941)
- Laugh Your Blues Away (1942; second billing)
- Let's Have Fun (1943; top billing)
- How Doooo You Do!!! (1945; top billing)

== In popular culture ==
Gordon's character was parodied a number of times in Warner Bros. cartoons, including:

- Bob Clampett's What's Cookin' Doc? (1944), in which Bugs Bunny wins a "Booby Prize Oscar", and tells it "I'll take youse to bed with me every night", upon which the Oscar-like statue comes to life and says, in The Mad Russian's voice, "Do you mean it?".
- Clampett's Russian Rhapsody (1944), in which a "Gremlin from the Kremlin" says "How do you doooo" with Gordon's inflections before hitting Hitler with a mallet.
- Clampett's Hare Ribbin' (1944), in which the Gordon character, voiced by Sammy Wolfe, is a dog with red hair who chases Bugs Bunny.
- Abbott and Costello, a contemporary comedy duo, parodied his "How do you dooooooo" catchphrase in an early 1940s episode of their radio series, which was later reissued on vinyl and audio cassette in the 1970s.
