= Alimony (1949 film) =

1949 film by Alfred Zeisler

- Directed by: Alfred Zeisler
- Written by: George Bricker (story); Royal K. Cole (screenplay); Lawrence Lipton (story) and Sherman L. Lowe (screenplay)
- Produced by: Constantin J. David (producer); Anthony Z. Landi (associate producer)
- Starring: See below
- Cinematography: Gilbert Warrenton
- Edited by: Joseph Gluck
- Music by: Alexander Laszlo
- Production companies: Equity Pictures; Orbit Productions
- Distributed by: Eagle-Lion Films
- Release date: June 11, 1949
- Running time: 70 minutes
- Country: United States
- Language: English

Alimony is a 1949 American film noir crime film directed by Alfred Zeisler and starring Martha Vickers.

The film starts with a father's search for his daughter who has disappeared. A former love interest of the missing woman narrates the events of their relationship, the nature of the woman's employment by a lawyer, and her arrest on charges of fraud.

== Plot ==
Paul Klinger is on a desperate search for his lost daughter, Kate. He goes to see a man in New York, Dan Barker, a songwriter who knew Kate in the past when she lived in the city. Dan tells Paul that Kate changed her name to Kitty Travers, and then continues to tell the story of what he knows about "Kitty":

Dan met Kitty when she was looking for work as a model and she happened to stay at the same boarding house as he and his girlfriend Linda Waring. A friend of Kitty's told her she could work as co-respondent in alimony cases where the man was framed to up the settlement sum. She started working for a lawyer Burt Crail and became involved in a big scandal, posing in a picture with a married man.

Kitty apparently showed an aptitude for the work and made a good chunk of money. In the end she became interested in Dan, just when he was about to break through as a songwriter.

Dan fell in love with Kitty and wrote her a song, breaking up with his girlfriend Linda. When Kitty found out that Dan wasn't going to be the success they expected, she left him and he resumed his relationship with his ex Linda. They married, and then came his real breakthrough, when the song he wrote for Kitty became a successful hit.

Kitty returned and wanted a piece of the cake, demanding to sing the song on Dan's tour around the country. Again, Dan fell in love with Kitty and eventually left his wife. The relationship only survived long enough for the royalty money to be spent and then Kitty left Dan again. He again returned to Linda, who took him back.

Kitty went on to bigger fish, marrying a millionaire named George Griswold, but secretly working for Crail again. Crail arranged for Griswold to be photographed with another woman, but before they got a settlement, it turned out Griswold had set them both up by sending a double, Curtis Carter.

Both Crail and Kitty were arrested for fraud, together with several other accomplices. This concludes Dan's story about Kitty. When he is done, Paul gets news that Kate, who is out on parole from her prison sentence, has been involved in a car crash and lies in a hospital.

Paul goes to the hospital and visits his daughter. They reconcile and he promises to help her start a new and better life.

== Cast ==
- Martha Vickers as Kitty Travers aka Kate Klinger
- John Beal as Dan Barker
- Hillary Brooke as Linda Waring
- Laurie Lind as Helen Drake
- Douglass Dumbrille as Burton (Burt) Crail
- James Guilfoyle as Paul Klinger
- Marie Blake as Mrs. Nesbitt
- Leonid Kinskey as Joe Wood
- Ralph Graves as George Griswold / Curtis P. Carter
- William Ruhl as Fred Richards
- Harry Lauter as Doctor

== Soundtrack ==
- Martha Vickers - "That's How Dreams Are Made" (Written by L. Wolfe Gilbert and Alexander Laszlo)
- Martha Vickers - "You Are All the World to Me" (Written by L. Wolfe Gilbert and Alexander Laszlo)
- John Beal - "Lullaby" (Written by L. Wolfe Gilbert and Alexander Laszlo)
