= Let's Have Fun (film) =

1943 film by Charles Barton

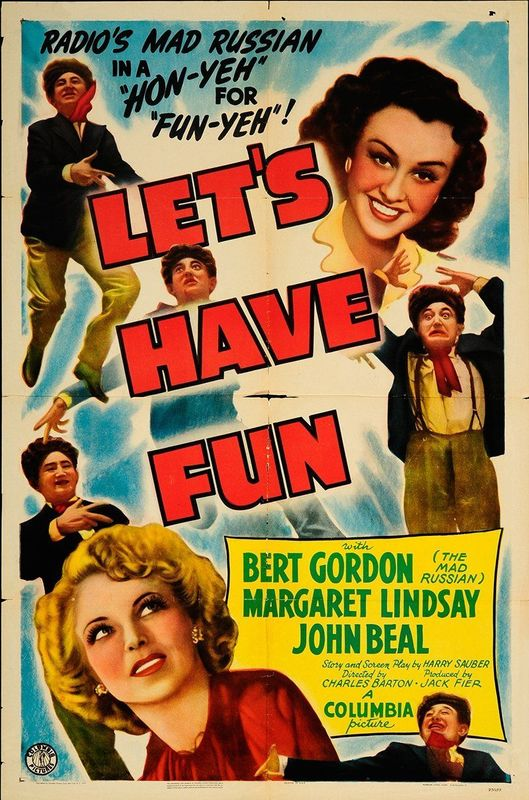
- Official release poster
- Directed by: Charles Barton
- Written by: Harry Sauber
- Screenplay by: Harry Sauber
- Story by: Harry Sauber
- Produced by: Jack Fier
- Starring: Bert Gordon; Margaret Lindsay; John Beal
- Cinematography: Philip Tannura
- Production company: Columbia Pictures
- Distributed by: Columbia Pictures
- Release date: March 4, 1943
- Running time: 67 minutes
- Country: United States
- Language: English

Let's Have Fun is a 1943 American comedy musical film directed by Charles Barton, produced by Jack Fier and written by Harry Sauber. It stars Bert Gordon, Margaret Lindsay, and John Beal. It was distributed by Columbia Pictures.

== Cast ==
- Bert Gordon as Boris Rascalnikoff
- John Beal as Richard Gilbert
- Constance Worth as Diana Crawford
- Margaret Lindsay as Florence Blake
- Dorothy Ann Seese as Toni Gilbert, Richard's daughter (uncredited)
- Leonid Kinskey as Gregory Loosnikoff
- Sig Arno as Ivan Bloosnikoff
- Edward Keane as James Bradley
- Ernest Hilliard as 'Pepe' J. Morgan
- John Tyrrell as Jimmy Wood
