= The Amazing Mr. Tutt =

American radio "lighthearted legal drama"

The Amazing Mr. Tutt is an American radio "lighthearted legal drama" that was broadcast on CBS from July 5, 1948, through August 23, 1948.

== Premise ==
The Amazing Mr. Tutt related activities of Ephraim Tutt, "an uncanny and cantankerous New England Attorney" whose character was created by Arthur Train. Tutt's adventures were published in stories in The Saturday Evening Post. He "had at his fingertips every obscure law and legal ruling ever handed down in any court at any time" and used that knowledge to help innocent people. When he bent the law to his advantage, problems usually resulted.

Episodes were narrated by Bonnie Doon, Tutt's "legal helper". Other characters who regularly were heard were Judge Babson, district attorney O'Brion, and Edgar, the guard in the courthouse.

== Cast ==
- Ephraim Tull - Will Wright
- Bonnie Doon - John Beal
- Judge Babson - Norman Field
- DA O'Brion - Joe Granby
- Edgar - Herb Rawlinson

== Production ==
Roy Rowan was the announcer, and Lud Gluskin provided music. Anton M. Leader produced and directed, and Arnold Perl was the writer. The half-hour program was on Mondays at 9:30 p.m. Eastern Time, as a summer replacement for the first half of Lux Radio Theatre. It was sustaining.

== Episodes ==
An audition episode was broadcast on June 24, 1948. Dates and titles of most of the regular episodes are shown in the table below.

Partial List of Episodes of The Amazing Mr. Tutt
Date	Title
July 5, 1948	"Advice to a Young Lawyer"
July 19, 1948	"Live Bait"
July 26, 1948	"Mr. Tutt Takes the Stand"
August 2, 1948	"The Dog Andrew"
August 16, 1948	"King Wagamoc's Revenge"
August 23, 1948	"The Liberty of the Jail"

Some scripts from The Amazing Mr. Tutt are housed in the KNX Collection at the University of California, Santa Barbara Library.

== Critical response ==
A review in the trade publication Variety predicted a short life for The Amazing Mr. Tutt, saying that the program probably would survive the summer, but chances of obtaining a sponsor were slim. The review mentioned much discussion about the potential of adapting the Tutt character on film, radio, and stage, but it said that this adaptation "sounds like a low-budget rewrite of "Mr. D. A." and "Mayor of the Town", but minus either the law-enforcement aura of the one or the star performance-personality of the latter." The review said that the premiere episode had flashy production but "the yarn didn't sound fresh, even moderately inspired, or particularly interesting." Overall, the review summarized, the episode "seemed a routine treatment of rather old material."

Magee Adams wrote in The Cincinnati Enquirer that in the premiere episode Wright's performance and Perl's script "blended admirably to produce a warm and absorbing story".

Syndicated media critic John Crosby compared the Tutt series favorably to the printed stories about the character, reassuring Tutt's fans that "their hero has been treated with suitable reverence."

== Television ==
Parker Fennelly portrayed Tutt in "Ephraim Tutt's Clean Hands", the August 12, 1951, episode of The Philco Television Playhouse. It was Fennelly's television debut. Muriel Kirkland played Minerva Wiggin, Tutt's confidential secretary, in the episode.

Two pilots were made in efforts to adapt the radio series to television. Both starred Walter Brennan as Tutt. The 1955 pilot, produced by Desi Arnaz and written by Winston O'Keefe, was never broadcast. The second pilot was aired on NBC on September 10, 1958. Olive Blakeney portrayed Tutt's wife, Olive. Harry Harvey Jr. played Tutt's assistant, Charlie. O'Keefe was the producer, and Jerry Thorpe was the director. Harold Swanton and Ellis Marcus were the writers.
