= Road to Reality =

- Narrated by: Joel Crager
- Country of origin: United States
- Original language: English

Production
- Running time: 30 minutes

Original release
- Network: ABC
- Release: October 17, 1960 – March 31, 1961

Road to Reality was a half-hour American daytime television show that aired on ABC from October 17, 1960 to March 31, 1961, at 2:30pm EST. The daily program dramatized group therapy sessions that were apparently written from transcripts of actual sessions. The show was ABC's first daytime drama, and the first to bring psychoanalysis to daytime television.

The show starred John Beal as the moderator of the group, Dr. Lewis, and was announced by Joel Crager. The five (later six) patients were played by professional actors. Issues that the patients discussed included fear of intimacy, and shyness. The UCLA Film and Television Archive holds two episodes in its collection.

== Premise ==
The daily introduction to the series said:

You are about to see and hear the reenactment of sessions of group psychoanalysis which actually took place and were recorded. The men and women know each other only by first names. Their parts, and that of the psychoanalyst, are played by actors. The actual people involved have consented to this portrayal. Names have been changed to protect their identities. What they say may sometimes embarrass or even shock you. But only by speaking frankly can they help themselves and each other and perhaps also find the road to reality.

== Cast ==
The cast included Eugenia Rawls (Margaret), Robert Drew (Vic), Judith Braun (Joan), Kay Doubleday (Chris), James Dimitri (Lee), and Robin Howard (Rosalind).

== Reception ==
The show was described favorably by psychiatrists working in psychoanalytics at the time, although it had limited popularity with the general audience.
