= Laugh Your Blues Away =

1942 film by Charles Barton

- Theatrical release poster
- Directed by: Charles Barton
- Screenplay by: Harry Sauber; Ned Dandy
- Story by: Harry Sauber
- Produced by: Jack Fier
- Starring: Jinx Falkenburg; Bert Gordon; Johnny Mitchell; Isobel Elsom; Roger Clark; George Lessey
- Cinematography: Philip Tannura
- Edited by: Richard Fantl
- Production company: Columbia Pictures
- Distributed by: Columbia Pictures
- Release date: November 12, 1942
- Running time: 65 minutes
- Country: United States
- Language: English

Laugh Your Blues Away is a 1942 American comedy film directed by Charles Barton and written by Harry Sauber and Ned Dandy. The film stars Jinx Falkenburg, Bert Gordon, Johnny Mitchell, Isobel Elsom, Roger Clark and George Lessey. The film was released on November 12, 1942, by Columbia Pictures.

== Cast ==
- Jinx Falkenburg as Pam Crawford / Olga
- Bert Gordon as Boris Rascalnikoff
- Johnny Mitchell as Jimmy Westerly
- Isobel Elsom as Mrs. Westerly
- Roger Clark as Blake Henley
- George Lessey as Mr. Westerly
- Vivien Oakland as Mrs. Conklin
- Dick Elliott as Mr. Conklin
- Phyllis Kennedy as Priscilla Conklin
- Robert Greig as Wilfred
- Frank Sully as Buck
- Clyde Fillmore as Sen. Hargrave
- Barbara Brown as Mrs. Hargrave
- Edna Holland as Mrs. Watson
- Edward Earle as Mr. Larkin
- Wyndham Standing as Mr. Jamison
- Florence Wix as Mrs. Jamison
- Louise Squire as Blonde
