= Leonid Kinskey =

Russian-German-American actor (1903–1998)

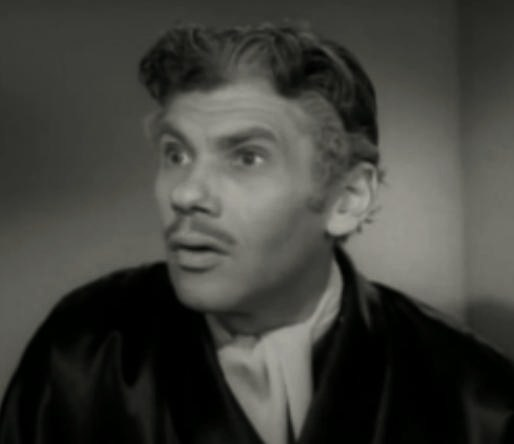
- Kinskey in Broadway Limited (1941)
- Born: 18 April 1903; St. Petersburg, Russian Empire
- Died: 8 September 1998 (aged 95); Fountain Hills, Arizona, U.S.
- Occupation: Actor
- Years active: 1922–1971
- Spouses: Josephine Tankus (née Sonja Zosia Wolk) (m. 1930; died 1939) Iphigenie Castiglioni (née Buchmann) (m. 1943; died 1963) Tina York (m. 1985)

Leonid Kinskey (April 17, 1903 – September 8, 1998) was a Russian-born American film and television actor, best known for his role as Sascha in the film Casablanca (1942). His last name was sometimes spelled Kinsky.

== Life and career ==
Kinskey was born in St. Petersburg, Russia. He started his career as a mime in various imperial theatres in Russia in the mid-1910s. In 1921, he fled Russia for Germany. He acted on stage in Europe and South America before arriving in New York City from Rio de Janeiro, Brazil, in January 1924. He joined the road production of Al Jolson's musical Wonder Bar, and in 1926 he made an appearance in the silent film The Great Depression, although his scenes were deleted, before making his appearance in Trouble in Paradise (1932).

His looks and accent helped him gain supporting roles in several movies, including the Sylvanian "agitator" in the Marx Bros. film Duck Soup (1933). He told Aljean Harmetz, author of Round Up the Usual Suspects: The Making of Casablanca, that he had been cast in his best-known role, Sascha in Casablanca, because he was a drinking buddy of star Humphrey Bogart.

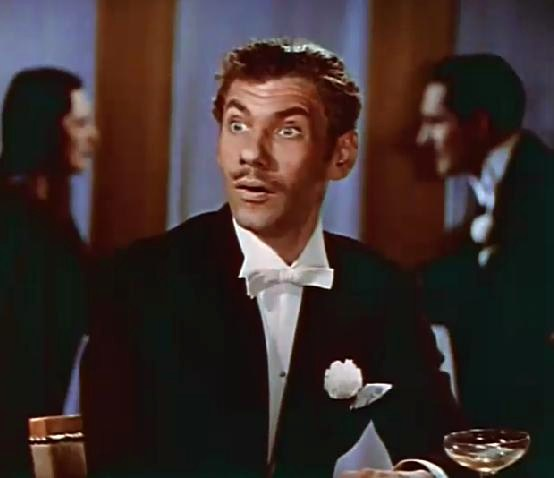
Kinskey in That Night in Rio (1941)

Kinskey performed in episodes of some three dozen television shows between the 1950s and early 1970s. His first appearances on the "small screen" were in 1954 on Passport to Danger, The Spike Jones Show, and Lux Video Theater. In 1962, he portrayed a visiting Soviet dignitary (with most of his dialogue in Russian) in the episode "The Good Will Tour" on the sitcom The Real McCoys. In 1965, Kinskey appeared in the pilot episode of Hogan's Heroes as a Soviet soldier who was a prisoner-of-war. He decided not to join the cast of the series, as he was reported to be "uncomfortable playing let's-pretend with people in Nazi garb." His final roles on television came in 1971, as a professor on the series Mayberry R.F.D., a funeral director on O'Hara, U.S. Treasury, and a deli butcher on the sitcom The Chicago Teddy Bears.

After the mid-1950s, Kinskey spent little time on his acting career. He wrote and directed industrial films, owned a restaurant called Bublitschki on Sunset Strip, and wrote and translated stories about Russian life.

== Personal life and death ==
Kinskey was married three times, first to Josephine Tankus from 1930 until her death in 1939. Four years later he married actress Iphigenie Castiglioni, who died in 1963. His final marriage, in 1985 in New York, was to Tina York, who was 38 years younger. They remained married until 1998, when Kinskey died in Fountain Hills, Arizona, from complications of a stroke.

== Filmography ==
- The Big Broadcast (1932) as Ivan
- Trouble in Paradise (1932) as Russian Visitor (uncredited)
- Storm at Daybreak (1933) as Serbian Villager (uncredited)
- Duck Soup (1933) as Agitator
- Girl Without a Room (1933) as Gallopsky
- The Cat and the Fiddle (1934) as Hans - Conservatory Violinist (uncredited)
- Manhattan Melodrama (1934) as Trotskyite Slapping Poppa Rosen (uncredited)
- Change of Heart (1934) as Party Guest (uncredited)
- Strictly Dynamite (1934) as Garçon (uncredited)
- Hollywood Party (1934) as Jake the Cabbie (uncredited)
- Fugitive Road (1934) as Nicholas Petrovich,- Smuggler
- Straight Is the Way (1934) as Mechanic (uncredited)
- The Merry Widow (1934) as Shepherd (uncredited)
- Marie Galante (1934) as Arohnson (uncredited)
- We Live Again (1934) as Simon Kartinkin
- The Lives of a Bengal Lancer (1935) as Snake Charmer (uncredited)
- The Gilded Lily (1935) as Vocal Teacher (uncredited)
- Les Misérables (1935) as Genflou
- Goin' to Town (1935) as Cecil - Interior Decorator (uncredited)
- I Live My Life (1935) as Waiter (uncredited)
- Peter Ibbetson (1935) as Prisoner (uncredited)
- Three Godfathers (1936) as Card Player (uncredited)
- The Road to Glory (1936) as Wounded Soldier
- Rhythm on the Range (1936) as Mischa
- A Son Comes Home (1936) as Hoodlum (uncredited)
- The General Died at Dawn (1936) as Stewart
- The Big Broadcast of 1937 (1936) as Russian (uncredited)
- The Garden of Allah (1936) as Voluble Arab (uncredited)
- Love on the Run (1936) as Man on Train (uncredited)
- We're on the Jury (1937) as Professor Nicholas Krakin
- Espionage (1937) as Maxie Burgos
- Maytime (1937) as Student in Bar (uncredited)
- The Woman I Love (1937) (uncredited)
- Cafe Metropole (1937) as Artist
- The Girl from Scotland Yard (1937) as Mischa
- Married Before Breakfast (1937) as Mischa Lapidoff (uncredited)
- Meet the Boyfriend (1937) as Dr. Sokoloff
- Make a Wish (1937) as Moe
- One Hundred Men and a Girl (1937) as Pianist at Mrs. Frost's Party (uncredited)
- The Sheik Steps Out (1937) as Allusi Ali
- My Dear Miss Aldrich (1937) as A Waiter
- Nothing Sacred (1937) as Ferdinand Roassare - Poet (uncredited)
- Wise Girl (1937) as Eccentric Greenwich Village Writer (uncredited)
- Outside of Paradise (1938) as Cafe Owner Ivan Petrovich
- The Big Broadcast of 1938 (1938) as Ivan (uncredited)
- A Trip to Paris (1938) as Emile
- Three Blind Mice (1938) as Young Man
- Professor Beware (1938) as Tableau Director (uncredited)
- Algiers (1938) as L'Arbi
- The Great Waltz (1938) as Dudelman
- Flirting with Fate (1938) as Pedro Lopez
- The Story of Vernon and Irene Castle (1939) as Artist
- Exile Express (1939) as David
- The Spellbinder (1939) as Harry Beldon - Saxophone Player
- On Your Toes (1939) as Ivan Boultonoff
- Day-Time Wife (1939) as Coco
- Everything Happens at Night (1939) as Groder
- He Stayed for Breakfast (1940) as Comrade Nicky
- Down Argentine Way (1940) as Tito Acuna
- So Ends Our Night (1941) as The Chicken
- That Night in Rio (1941) as Pierre
- Broadway Limited (1941) as Ivan
- Week-End in Havana (1941) as Rafael
- Ball of Fire (1941) as Prof. Quintana
- Lady for a Night (1942) as Boris
- Brooklyn Orchid (1942) as Ignatz Rachkowsky
- I Married an Angel (1942) as Zinski
- The Talk of the Town (1942) as Jan Pulaski
- Somewhere I'll Find You (1942) as Dorloff (uncredited)
- Casablanca (1942) as Sacha
- Cinderella Swings It (1943) as Vladimir Smitkin
- Let's Have Fun (1943) as Gregory Loosnikoff
- El circo (1943) as Cliente ruso zapatero
- Presenting Lily Mars (1943) as Leo
- Gildersleeve on Broadway (1943) as Window Washer
- Five Were Chosen (1944)
- The Fighting Seabees (1944) as Johnny Novasky
- That's My Baby! (1944) as Doctor Svatsky
- Can't Help Singing (1944) as Koppa
- Monsieur Beaucaire (1946) as Rene
- Alimony (1949) as Joe Wood
- The Great Sinner (1949) as Bandleader in Park (uncredited)
- Nancy Goes to Rio (1950) as Ivan Putroff (uncredited)
- Honeychile (1951) as Chick Lister
- Gobs and Gals (1952) as Ivan
- The Man with the Golden Arm (1955) as Dominiwski
- Glory (1956) as Vasily
- The Helen Morgan Story (1957) as Stanislausky - Accordion Player (uncredited)

== Television credits ==
Date	Title	Role	Episode
February 3, 1962	Have Gun Will Travel	Prince Boris Koslov Radachev	"The Hunt"
November 1, 1964	My Favorite Martian	Prof. Hammershlag	"Extra! Extra! Sensory Perception!"
September 17, 1965	Hogan's Heroes	Sergeant Vladimir Minsk	"The Informer"
January 4, 1967	Batman (TV Series)	Professor Overbeck	"The Contaminated Cowl"
January 5, 1967	Batman (TV Series)	Professor Overbeck	"The Mad Hatter Runs Afoul"
