= Sing for Your Supper (film) =

1941 film

- Directed by: Charles Barton
- Screenplay by: Harry Rebuas
- Produced by: Leon Barsha
- Starring: Jinx Falkenburg; Charles "Buddy" Rogers; Eve Arden; Benny Baker; Bert Gordon
- Cinematography: Franz Planer
- Edited by: Arthur Seid
- Music by: Carmen Dragon
- Production company: Columbia Pictures
- Distributed by: Columbia Pictures
- Release date: December 4, 1941
- Running time: 66 minutes
- Country: United States
- Language: English

Sing for Your Supper is a 1941 American musical comedy film directed by Charles Barton and starring Jinx Falkenburg, Charles "Buddy" Rogers and Eve Arden. It was produced and distributed by Columbia Pictures.

== Cast ==
- Jinx Falkenburg as Evelyn Palmer
- Charles 'Buddy' Rogers as Larry Hays
- Bert Gordon as The Mad Russian
- Eve Arden as Barbara Stevens
- Don Beddoe as Wing Boley
- Bernadene Hayes as Kay Martin
- Henry Kolker as Myron T. Hayworth
- Benny Baker as William
- Dewey Robinson as 'Bonzo'
- Lloyd Bridges as Doc
- Sig Arno as Raskalnikoff
- Walter Sande as Irv
- Harry Barris as Jimmy
- Patricia Knox as Sue
- Don Porter as Tim
- Mildred Gover as Nancy
- Larry Parks as Mickey

== Bibliography ==
- Fetrow, Alan G. Feature Films, 1940-1949: a United States Filmography. McFarland, 1994.
- Tucker, David C. Eve Arden: A Chronicle of All Film, Television, Radio and Stage Performances. McFarland, 2014.
