= Cynthia Nixon =

American actress and politician

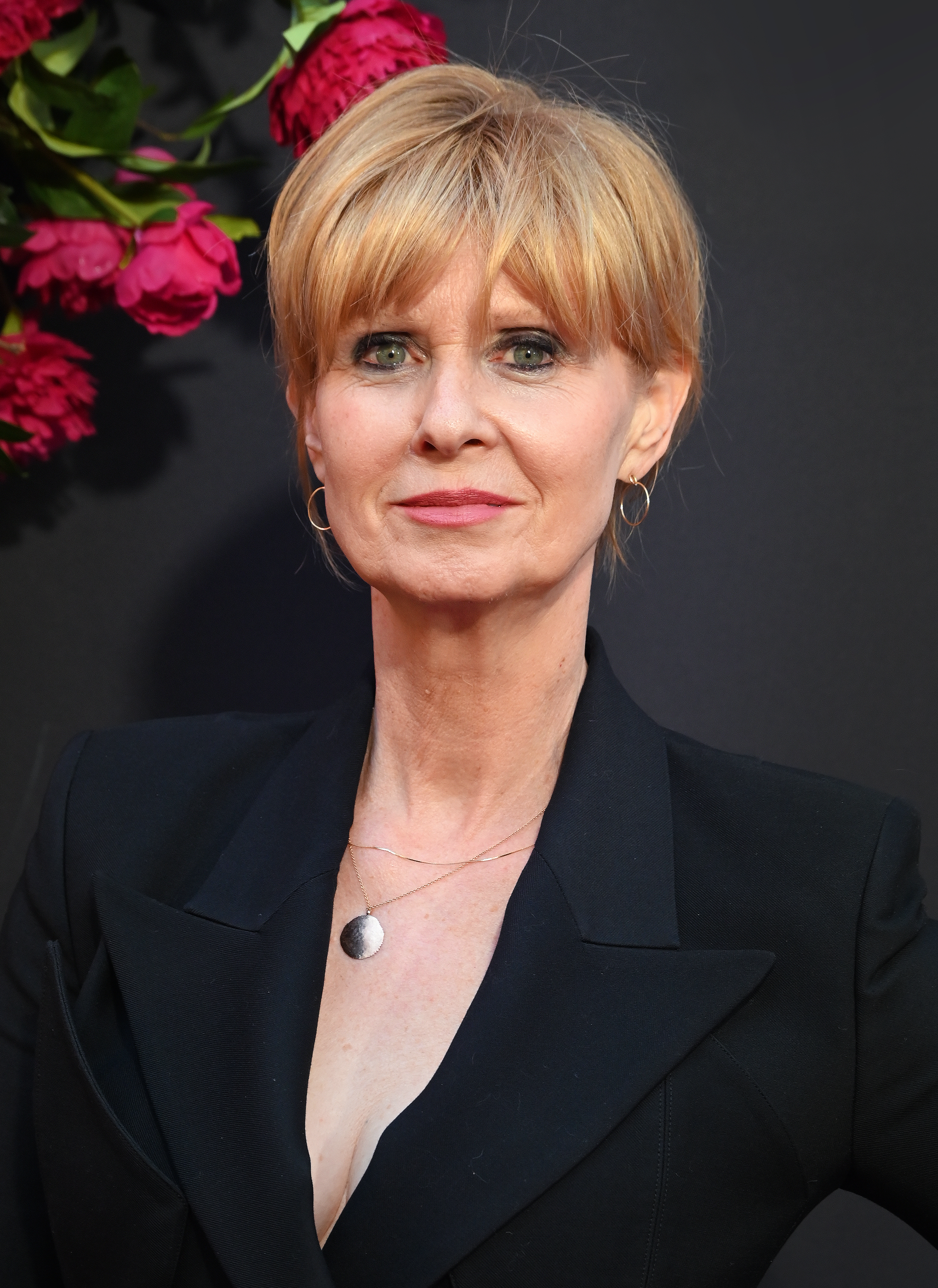
- Nixon in 2025
- Born: April 9, 1966 (age 60); Manhattan, New York, U.S.
- Education: Barnard College (BA)
- Occupations: Actress; activist; theatre director
- Years active: 1979–present
- Political party: Democratic
- Spouse: Christine Marinoni (m. 2012)
- Partner: Danny Mozes (1988–2003)
- Children: 3
- Awards: Full list

Cynthia Nixon (born April 9, 1966) is an American actress, activist, and theatre director. She has received various accolades, including two Primetime Emmy Awards, two Tony Awards, and a Grammy Award, making her one of the few actresses to have won three of the four major American entertainment awards (EGOT). She has also been nominated for six Golden Globe Awards. Nixon is best known for her portrayal of Miranda Hobbes in the HBO series Sex and the City (1998–2004) and films Sex and the City (2008) and Sex and the City 2 (2010), as well as the television show And Just Like That... (2021–2025).

Nixon made her Broadway debut in the 1980 revival of The Philadelphia Story. She went on to receive two Tony Awards: the first for Best Actress in a Play for Rabbit Hole (2006), and the second for Best Featured Actress in a Play for The Little Foxes (2017). Her other Broadway credits include The Real Thing (1983), Hurlyburly (1983), Indiscretions (1995), The Women (2001), and Wit (2012).

She won the Primetime Emmy Award for Outstanding Guest Actress in a Drama Series for Law & Order: Special Victims Unit in 2008 and a Grammy Award for Best Spoken Word Album for An Inconvenient Truth in 2009. She acted in the films Amadeus (1984), James White (2015), and A Quiet Passion (2016). She portrayed Eleanor Roosevelt in Warm Springs (2005), Michele Davis in Too Big to Fail (2011), and Nancy Reagan in Killing Reagan (2016). Her other television credits include The Big C (2010–2011), Ratched (2020), and The Gilded Age (2022–present).

In 2018, Nixon ran for governor of New York as part of the Working Families Party challenging Democratic incumbent Andrew Cuomo. She lost the Democratic primary to Cuomo on September 13, 2018, with 34% of the vote to his 66%.

Nixon has been an advocate for LGBT rights in the United States, particularly the right of same-sex marriage. She met her wife at a 2002 gay rights rally, and announced her engagement at a rally for New York same-sex marriage in 2009. She received the Visibility Award from the Human Rights Campaign in 2018.

== Early life and education ==
Nixon was born in the Manhattan borough of New York City, the only child of Walter Elmer Nixon Jr., a radio journalist from Harlingen, Texas, and Anne Elizabeth (née Knoll), an actress originally from Chicago. She credits her mother with "indoctrinating" her into theatre. She is of English and German descent. Her grandparents were Adolph Knoll, Etta Elizabeth Williams, Walter E. Nixon, and Grace Truman McCormack. Nixon's parents divorced when she was six years old. According to Nixon, her father was often unemployed and her mother was the household's main breadwinner: Nixon's mother worked on the game show To Tell the Truth, coaching the "impostors" who claimed to be the person described by the host.

Nixon was an actress all through her years at Hunter College Elementary School and Hunter College High School (class of 1984), often taking time away from school to perform in film and on stage. She acted in order to pay her way through Barnard College, where she received a B.A. in English Literature. She was also a student in the Semester at Sea program on the Spring 1986 voyage.

== Career ==
=== 1979–1997: Early roles and theatre work ===
Nixon's first onscreen appearance (at 8 years old) was as an imposter on To Tell the Truth, where her mother worked, pretending to be a junior horse riding champion. She began acting at 12 as the object of a wealthy schoolmate's crush in The Seven Wishes of a Rich Kid, a 1979 ABC Afterschool Special. She made her feature debut co-starring with Kristy McNichol and Tatum O'Neal in Little Darlings (1980). She made her Broadway debut as Dinah Lord in a 1980 revival of The Philadelphia Story. Alternating between film, TV, and stage, she did projects like the 1982 ABC movie My Body, My Child, the features Prince of the City (1981) and I Am the Cheese (1983), and the 1982 Off-Broadway productions of John Guare's Lydie Breeze.

In 1984, while a freshman at Barnard College, Nixon made theatrical history by simultaneously appearing in two hit Broadway plays directed by Mike Nichols. They were The Real Thing, where she played the daughter of Jeremy Irons and Christine Baranski; and Hurlyburly, where she played a young woman who encounters sleazy Hollywood executives. The two theaters were just two blocks apart and Nixon's roles were both short, so she could run from one to the other. Onscreen, she played the role of Salieri's maid/spy, Lorl, in Amadeus (1984). In 1985, she appeared alongside Jeff Daniels in Lanford Wilson's Lemon Sky at Second Stage Theatre.

She landed her first major supporting role in a movie as an intelligent teenager who aids her boyfriend (Christopher Collet) in building a nuclear bomb in Marshall Brickman's The Manhattan Project (1986). Nixon was part of the cast of the NBC miniseries The Murder of Mary Phagan (NBC, 1988) starring Jack Lemmon and Kevin Spacey, and portrayed the daughter of a presidential candidate (Michael Murphy) in Tanner '88 (1988), Robert Altman's political satire for HBO. She reprised the role for the 2004 sequel, Tanner on Tanner.

On stage, Nixon portrayed Juliet in a 1988 New York Shakespeare Festival production of Romeo and Juliet, and acted in the workshop production of Wendy Wasserstein's Pulitzer Prize-winning The Heidi Chronicles, playing several characters after it came to Broadway in 1989. She was the guest star in the second episode of the long running NBC television series Law & Order. She played the role of an agoraphobic woman in a February 1993 episode of Murder, She Wrote, titled "Threshold of Fear".

Nixon succeeded Marcia Gay Harden as Harper Pitt in Tony Kushner's Angels in America (1994), received a Tony nomination for her performance in Indiscretions (Les Parents Terribles) (1996), her sixth Broadway show, and, although she originally lost the part to another actress, eventually took over the role of Lala Levy in the Tony-winning The Last Night of Ballyhoo (1997).

Nixon was a founding member of the Off-Broadway theatrical troupe Drama Dept., which included Sarah Jessica Parker, Dylan Baker, John Cameron Mitchell and Billy Crudup among its actors, appearing in the group's productions of Kingdom on Earth (1996), June Moon and As Bees in Honey Drown (both 1997), Hope is the Thing with Feathers (1998), and The Country Club (1999). She had supporting roles in Addams Family Values (1993), Baby's Day Out (1994), Marvin's Room (1996), and The Out-of-Towners (1999).

=== 1998–2011: Sex and the City and other roles ===
She was one of the four regulars on HBO's comedy Sex and the City (1998–2004), as lawyer Miranda Hobbes. Nixon received three Emmy Award nominations for Outstanding Supporting Actress in a Comedy Series (2002, 2003, 2004), winning the award in 2004, for the show's final season.

Nixon next had her first leading role in a feature, playing a video artist who falls in love, despite her best efforts to avoid commitment, with a bisexual actor who just happens to be dating a gay man (her best friend) in Advice from a Caterpillar (2000), as well as starring opposite Scott Bakula in the holiday television movie Papa's Angels (2000). In 2002, she also acted in the indie comedy Igby Goes Down, and her turn in the theatrical production of Clare Boothe Luce's play The Women was captured for PBS' Stage on Screen series.

Post-Sex and the City, Nixon made a guest appearance on ER in 2005, as a mother who undergoes a tricky procedure to lessen the effects of a debilitating stroke. She followed up with a turn as Eleanor Roosevelt for HBO's Warm Springs (2005), which chronicled Franklin Delano Roosevelt's quest for a miracle cure for his polio. Nixon earned an Emmy nomination as Outstanding Lead Actress in a Miniseries or a Movie for her performance. In December 2005, she appeared in the Fox TV series House in the episode "Deception", as a patient who suffers a seizure.

In 2006, she appeared in David Lindsay-Abaire's Pulitzer Prize-winning drama Rabbit Hole in a Manhattan Theatre Club production, and won the Tony Award for Best Actress in a Leading Role (Play). In 2008, she revived her role as Miranda Hobbes in the Sex and the City feature film, directed by HBO executive producer Michael Patrick King and co-starring the cast of the original series. Also in 2008, she won an Emmy for her guest appearance in an episode of Law & Order: Special Victims Unit, portraying a woman pretending to have dissociative identity disorder. In 2009, Nixon won the Grammy Award for Best Spoken Word Album along with Beau Bridges and Blair Underwood for the album An Inconvenient Truth (Al Gore).

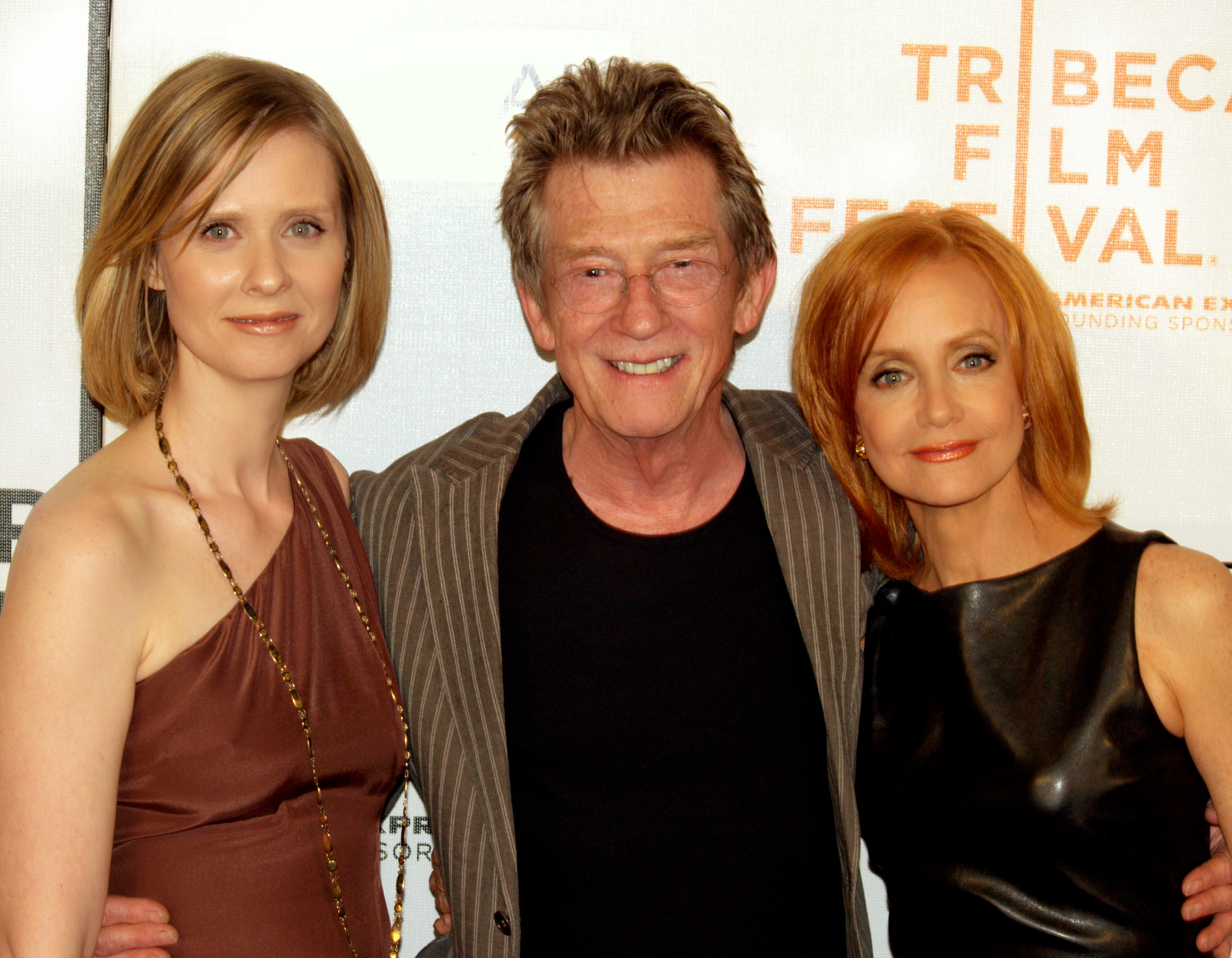
Nixon, John Hurt and Swoosie Kurtz at the premiere of An Englishman in New York, 2009

In March 2010, Nixon received the Vito Russo Award at the GLAAD Media Awards. The award is presented to an openly LGBTQ media professional "who has made a significant difference in promoting equality for the LGBT community". It was announced in June 2010 that Nixon would appear in four episodes of the Showtime series The Big C. Nixon appeared in a Law & Order: Criminal Intent episode based on the problems surrounding the Broadway musical Spider-Man: Turn Off the Dark. Her character is "Amanda Reese, the high-strung and larger-than-life director behind a problem-plagued Broadway version of Icarus," loosely modeled after Spider-Man director Julie Taymor.

=== 2012–2019: Return to Broadway ===
In 2012, Nixon starred as Professor Vivian Bearing in the Broadway debut of Margaret Edson's Pulitzer Prize–winning play Wit. Produced by the Manhattan Theatre Club, the play opened January 26, 2012 at the Samuel J. Friedman Theatre. Nixon received a Tony Award nomination for Best Actress in a Play for the performance. In 2012, Nixon also starred as Petranilla in the TV miniseries of Ken Follett's World Without End broadcast on the ReelzChannel, alongside Ben Chaplin, Peter Firth, Charlotte Riley, and Miranda Richardson.

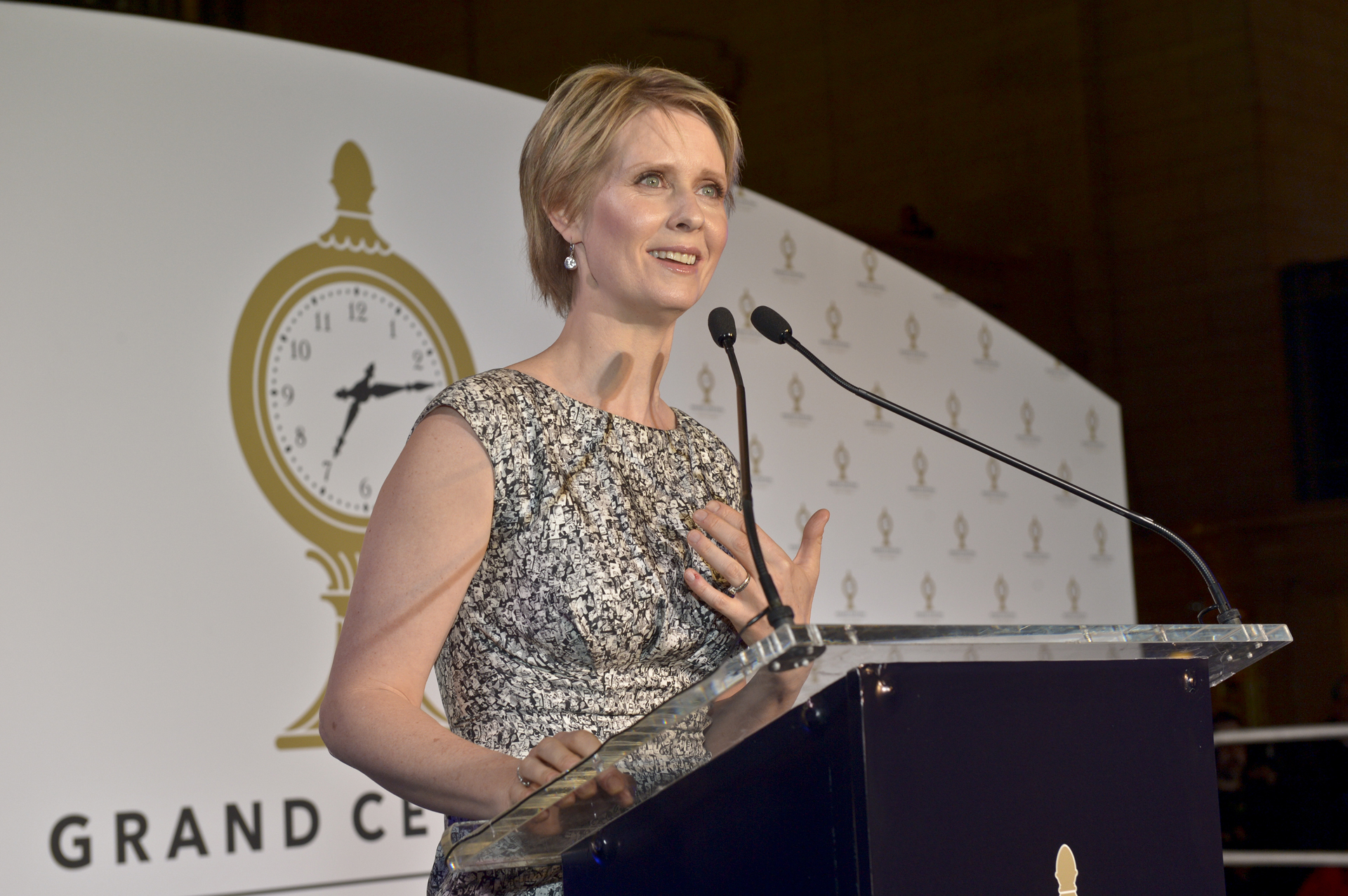
Nixon in 2013

In 2015, Nixon appeared in two films which premiered at the 2015 Sundance Film Festival: Stockholm, Pennsylvania and James White. She received critical acclaim for both performances, especially for the latter, which some considered as "Oscar-worthy".

Nixon played the leading role of reclusive American poet Emily Dickinson in the biographical film A Quiet Passion directed and written by Terence Davies. The film premiered in February 2016 at the 66th Berlin International Film Festival. In May 2016, it was announced that Nixon would play Nancy Reagan in the upcoming television film adaptation of Killing Reagan. The film aired in October 2016.

Nixon appeared on Broadway in the revival of The Little Foxes, officially opening on April 19, 2017, at the Samuel J. Friedman Theatre. She alternated the roles of Regina and Birdie with Laura Linney, winning her second Tony Award for her performance as Birdie.

=== 2020–present: Streaming shows ===
In January 2019, it was announced that Nixon will star in the upcoming Netflix drama series Ratched. Since 2021 she returned to the role of Miranda Hobbes in the Sex and the City revival And Just Like That... for HBO Max where she also serves as an executive producer. Since 2022 she took a leading role of Ada Brook in another HBO show The Gilded Age starring alongside Louisa Jacobson, Christine Baranski, and Carrie Coon.

== Political activism ==
Nixon is a member of the New York City chapter of Democratic Socialists of America. Nixon is a long-time advocate for public education. She is a spokesperson for New York's Alliance for Quality Education, a public education fairness advocacy organization. Nixon also has a history of advocacy in support of women's health.

She endorsed Bill de Blasio in the 2013 New York City mayoral election; he went on to win the Democratic nomination and the general election. Nixon campaigned actively for de Blasio, whom she had worked with since the early 2000s when campaigning against Michael Bloomberg's education policies. De Blasio credited Nixon and union leader George Gresham as the two "architects of (his) campaign" in the Democratic primaries, when he defeated the favorite Christine Quinn. After his election, de Blasio appointed Nixon as his representative to The Public Theater.

In the 2020 Democratic Party presidential primaries, Nixon endorsed Bernie Sanders before campaigning for him in early February 2020 in Las Vegas. She stated, "In the same terrifying and muscular way that Trump is a force for so much of what is bad in this country, in this world, Bernie has that same kind of muscularity of vision but for good. A candidate who is too beholden to big money and the establishment and just basically doesn't want to rock the boat is never going to be a powerful enough counterbalance to what Donald Trump has to offer. You need someone as vigorous and who is wanting to turn the system upside down."

In 2023, Nixon signed an open letter expressing "serious concerns about editorial bias" in reporting by The New York Times on transgender people. The letter characterized the NYT's coverage as using "an eerily familiar mix of pseudoscience and euphemistic, charged language", and raised concerns regarding the NYT's employment practices regarding trans contributors.

=== 2018 New York gubernatorial election ===
On March 19, 2018, Nixon announced her campaign for governor of New York as a challenger to Democratic incumbent Andrew Cuomo. Her platform focused on income inequality, renewable energy, establishing universal health care, stopping mass incarceration in the United States, and protecting undocumented children from deportation. She lost in the Democratic primary to Cuomo on September 13, 2018, with 34% of the vote to his 66%. Nixon was initially nominated as the gubernatorial candidate for the Working Families Party; however, the party threw its support to Cuomo, after he defeated Nixon in the Democratic primary.

Nixon was expected to secure the nomination of the Working Families Party of New York during its annual convention in April 2018, thus guaranteeing her a spot on the general election ballot. On April 15, Nixon won 91.5 percent of the vote at the party's statewide committee meeting after Cuomo withdrew himself from consideration at the last minute. Nixon stated that in the event that she did not also secure the Democratic nomination, she would "confer with the Working Families Party and we will make the decision we think is best".

The endorsement caused a schism in the party, as labor unions, including the Service Employees International Union, and Communications Workers of America, indicated they would not support the party in the election. The withdrawal, it was believed, would significantly hurt the party's finances which, in 2018, were at a level of $1.7 million and supported a statewide staff of about 15 people. The battle received considerable attention since there were concerns that Nixon might drain enough votes from Cuomo in the general election to allow a Republican to be elected (though Cuomo was comfortably leading in the polls at the time). Cuomo had vigorously campaigned to get the nomination before withdrawing when it was clear he would not get it.

In contrast to Cuomo, Nixon supported the legalization of marijuana. The most important reason, she said, was racial justice. "People across all ethnic and racial lines use marijuana at roughly the same rate, but the arrests for marijuana are 80 percent black and Latino." Nixon said that the revenues from legalization should be prioritized to the communities that had been harmed by them, as a form of "reparations". She said that people in jail on marijuana charges should be released, criminal records for marijuana use should be expunged, and marijuana revenues should be used to help them reenter society. However, many black leaders were offended by her use of the term "reparations".

On June 22, 2018, during a campaign event in New York City, Nixon referred to the U.S. Immigration and Customs Enforcement (ICE) as a "terrorist organization" and called for the agency to be abolished. She later reiterated her claim in a Twitter post.

On May 23, 2018, Nixon and other potential Democratic challengers to Cuomo were eliminated from the Democratic party endorsement at the state Democratic Convention after failing to meet the 25% state delegate threshold needed to appear on the ballot. Nixon filed a petition with 65,000 signatures, more than four times the 15,000 required, to force a primary election. The primary was held on September 13. Nixon lost the primary to Cuomo, with Cuomo receiving 65% of the vote and Nixon receiving 35%.

On October 5, 2018, the Working Families Party removed Nixon's name from their ticket after deciding to endorse Cuomo and Hochul, thus ensuring that Nixon would not appear on the general election ballot.

In August 2021, Cuomo was forced to resign as governor following allegations of sexual harassment by women who worked in his office. As a result of the scandal, he was stripped of the honorary Emmy given to him for his televised Covid briefings in 2020. After he left office, Nixon tweeted on August 24, 2021: "The difference between me and Andrew Cuomo? Neither of us is governor, but I still have my Emmy(s)."

=== Support for Palestine ===
Nixon supports South Africa's genocide case against Israel. She contributed to a video series, published by the Palestine Festival of Literature, in support of South Africa's motion, accusing Israel of genocide against civilians in Gaza. In December 2023, she joined a five-day hunger strike outside the White House calling for a ceasefire. She is a signatory of the Film Workers for Palestine boycott pledge that was published in September 2025. In September 2026, Nixon was arrested alongside over 100 protestors at a protest ahead of a speech by Israeli prime minister Benjamin Netanyahu at the United Nations General Assembly.

=== 2025 New York City mayoral election ===
Nixon endorsed Zohran Mamdani in the 2025 New York City Democratic mayoral primary and hosted a fundraiser for his campaign. She also appeared in a digital advertisement paid for by the Working Families Party opposing Andrew Cuomo.

== Personal life ==
From 1988 to 2003, Nixon was in a relationship with educator Danny Mozes. They have two children together born in 1996 and 2002 respectively. In June 2018, Nixon revealed that her older child is transgender.

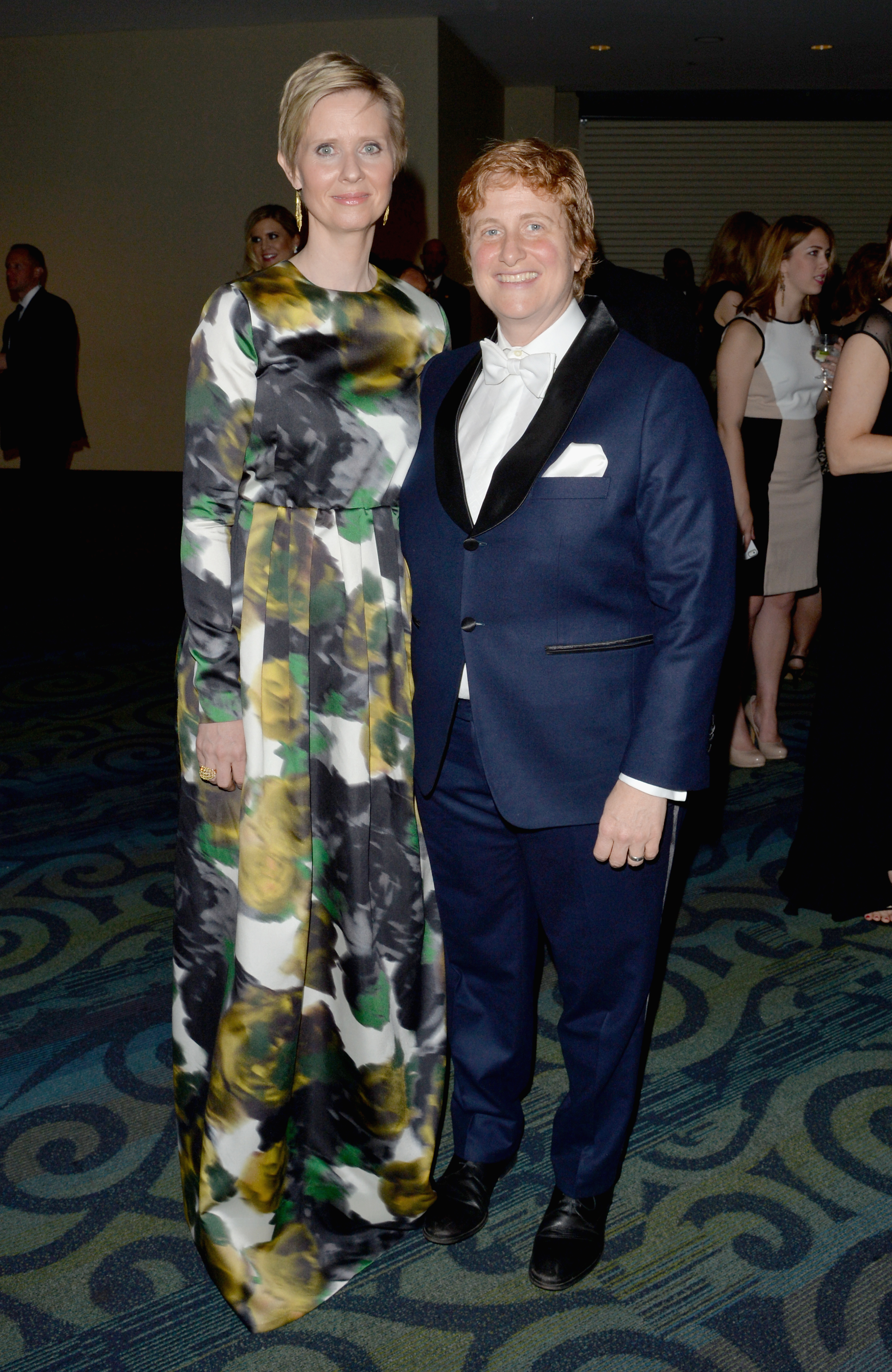
Nixon and her wife, Christine Marinoni (2014)

In 2004, Nixon began dating education activist Christine Marinoni. They became engaged in April 2009, and married in New York City on May 27, 2012, with Nixon wearing a custom-made, pale green dress by Carolina Herrera. Marinoni gave birth to a son in 2011.

Regarding her sexual orientation, Nixon remarked in 2007: "I don't really feel I've changed. I'd been with men all my life, and I'd never fallen in love with a woman. But when I did, it didn't seem so strange. I'm just a woman in love with another woman." She identified herself as bisexual in 2012, and as queer starting in 2018. Prior to the legalization of same-sex marriage in Washington state (Marinoni's home state), Nixon had taken a public stand supporting the issue, and hosted a fundraising event in support of Washington Referendum 74.

In October 2006, Nixon was diagnosed with breast cancer during a routine mammography. She initially decided not to go public with her illness because she feared it might hurt her career, but in April 2008, she announced her battle with the disease in an interview with Good Morning America. Since then, Nixon has become a breast cancer activist. She convinced the head of NBC to air her breast cancer special in a prime time program, and became an ambassador for Susan G. Komen for the Cure.

She and Marinoni live in the Kips Bay neighborhood of Manhattan, New York City.

Nixon is not Jewish, but the father of her children is, and her family attends Congregation Beit Simchat Torah, an LGBT synagogue.

== Performances and works ==
=== Film ===
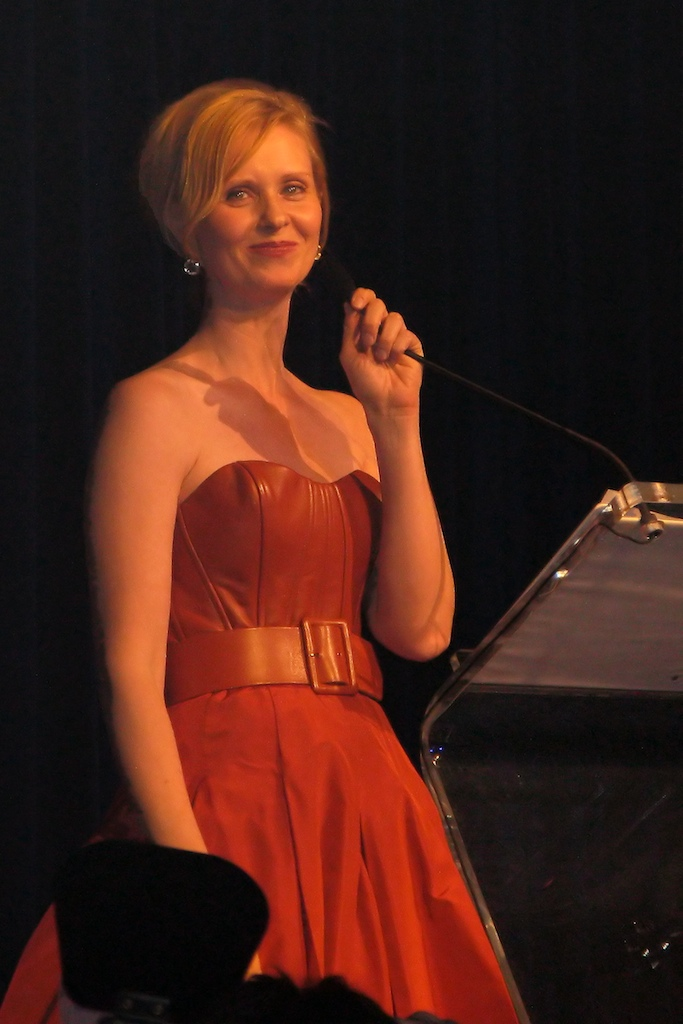
Nixon at a charity function, March 2008

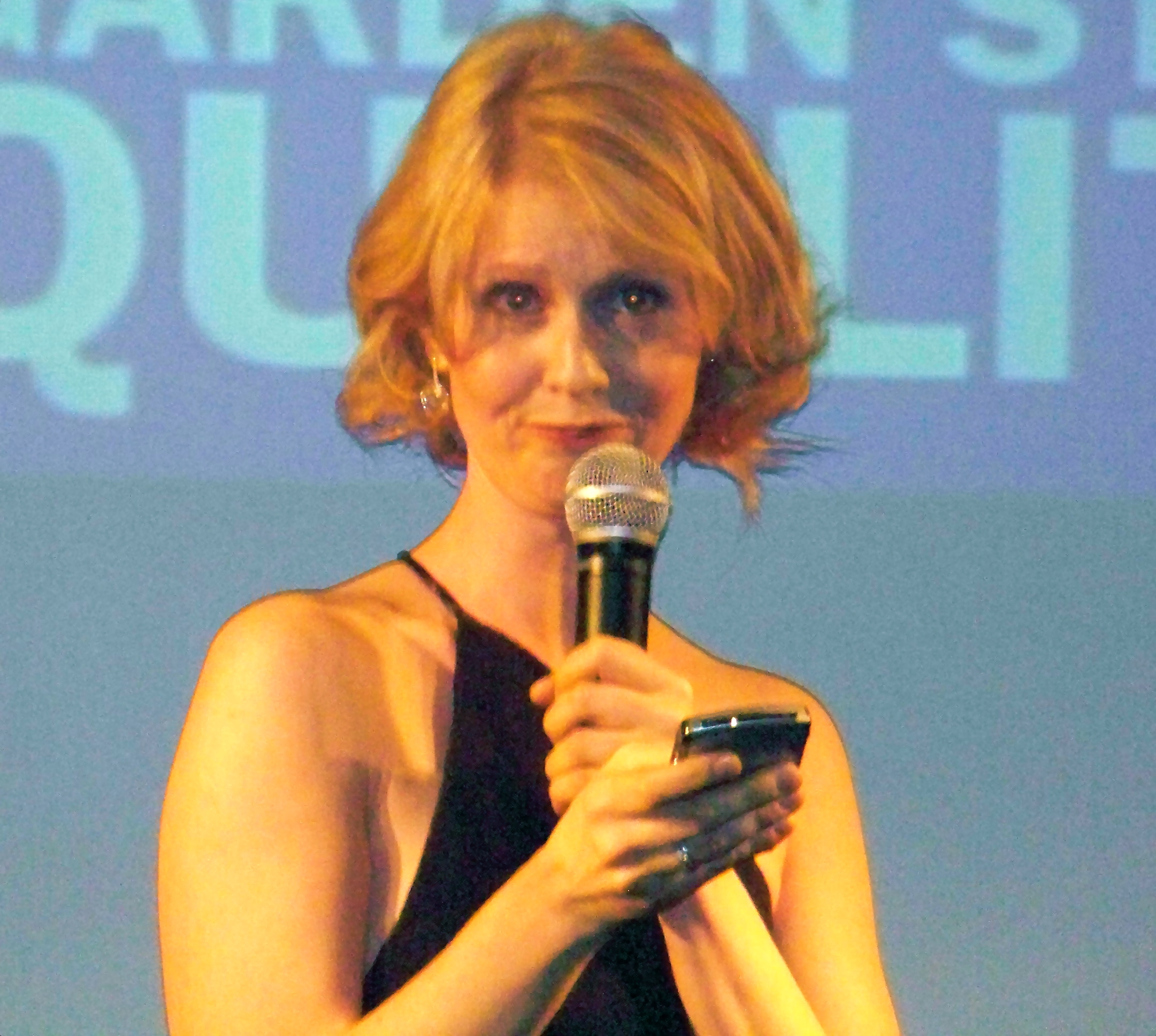
Nixon, 2008 Garden State Equality gala

Year	Title	Role	Notes
1980	Little Darlings	Sunshine Walker	
1981	Tattoo	Cindy	
1981	Prince of the City	Jeannie	
1983	I Am the Cheese	Amy Hertz	
1984	Amadeus	Lorl	
1986	The Manhattan Project	Jenny Anderman	
1987	O.C. and Stiggs	Michelle	
1988	The Murder of Mary Phagan	Doreen	
1989	Let It Ride	Evangeline	
1993	The Pelican Brief	Alice Stark	
1993	Addams Family Values	Heather	
1993	Through an Open Window	Nancy Cooper	Short film
1994	Baby's Day Out	Gilbertine	
1996	Marvin's Room	Retirement Home Director	
2000	Papa's Angels	Sharon Jenkins	
2001	Advice from a Caterpillar	Missy	
2002	Igby Goes Down	Mrs. Piggee	
2005	Little Manhattan	Leslie Burton	
2006	One Last Thing...	Carol	
2007	The Babysitters	Gail Beltran	
2008	Sex and the City: The Movie	Miranda Hobbes	
2009	Lymelife	Melissa Bragg	
2009	An Englishman in New York	Penny Arcade	
2010	Sex and the City 2	Miranda Hobbes	
2011	Rampart	Barbara	
2014	5 Flights Up	Lilly	
2015	Stockholm, Pennsylvania	Marcy Dargon	
2015	James White	Gail White	
2015	The Adderall Diaries	Jen Davis	
2016	A Quiet Passion	Emily Dickinson	
2017	The Only Living Boy in New York	Judith Webb	
2018	The Parting Glass	Mare	
2019	Stray Dolls	Una	
2020	Tailing Pond	Narrator (voice)	Short film

=== Television ===
Year	Title	Role	Notes
1982	Rascals and Robbers: The Secret Adventures of Tom Sawyer and Huckleberry Finn	Alice	TV film
1982	My Body, My Child	Nancy	TV film
1988	Tanner '88	Alex Tanner	10 episodes
1989	Gideon Oliver	Allison Parrish Slocum	Episode: "Sleep Well, Professor Oliver"
1989	The Equalizer	Jackie	Episode: "Silent Fury"
1990	The Young Riders	Annie	2 episodes
1990	Law & Order	Laura di Biasi	Episode: "Subterranean Homeboy Blues"
1990	A Green Journey	Janet	TV film
1991	Love, Lies and Murder	Donna	Miniseries
1993	Murder, She Wrote	Alice Morgan	Episode: "Threshold of Fear"
1996	Early Edition	Sheila	Episode: "Baby"
1996	Nash Bridges	Melissa	Episode: "Aloha Nash"
1998–2004	Sex and the City	Miranda Hobbes	Main role; 94 episodes
1999	The Outer Limits	Trudy	Episode: "Alien Radio"
1999	Touched by an Angel	Melina Richardson/Sister Sarah	Episode: "Into the Fire"
2004	Tanner on Tanner	Alex Tanner	4 episodes
2005	ER	Ellie	Episode: "Alone in a Crowd"
2005	Warm Springs	Eleanor Roosevelt	TV film
2005	House	Anica Jovanovich	Episode: "Deception"
2007	Law & Order: Special Victims Unit	Janis Donovan	Episode: Alternate
2010–2011	The Big C	Rebecca	10 episodes
2011	Too Big to Fail	Michele Davis	TV film
2011	Law & Order: Criminal Intent	Amanda Reese	Episode: "Icarus"
2012	World Without End	Petronilla	7 episodes
2012	30 Rock	Herself	Episode: "Kidnapped by Danger"
2013–2014	Alpha House	Senator Carly Armiston	6 episodes
2014	Hannibal	Kade Prurnell	4 episodes
2015	The Affair	Marilyn	Episode: "210"
2016	Broad City	Barb	Episode: "2016"
2016	Killing Reagan	Nancy Reagan	TV film
2020	Ratched	Gwendolyn Briggs	Main cast
2021–2025	And Just Like That...	Miranda Hobbes	33 episodes, also executive producer and director
2022–present	The Gilded Age	Ada Brook	Main cast

=== Stage ===
Year	Title	Role	Venue	Notes	Ref
1980–1981	The Philadelphia Story	Dinah Lord	Vivian Beaumont Theatre	60 performances	
1984–1985	The Real Thing	Debbie	Plymouth Theatre	Later returned to the role while simultaneously appearing in Hurlyburly	
1984–1985	Hurlyburly	Donna	Ethel Barrymore Theatre	Performed simultaneously while appearing in The Real Thing	
1989–1990	The Heidi Chronicles	Becky / Clara / Denise	Plymouth Theatre		
1994	Angels in America: Millennium Approaches	Harper Pitt / Martin Heller (replacement)	Walter Kerr Theatre		
1994	Angels in America: Perestroika	Harper Pitt (replacement)	Walter Kerr Theatre		
1995	Indiscretions	Madeleine	Ethel Barrymore Theatre	220 performances	
1997–1998	The Last Night of Ballyhoo	Lala Levy (replacement)	Helen Hayes Theatre		
2001–2002	The Women	Mary Haines	American Airlines Theatre	77 performances	
2006	Rabbit Hole	Becca	Biltmore Theatre	77 performances	
2012	Wit	Vivian Bearing, Ph.D.	Samuel J. Friedman Theatre	60 performances	
2014–2015	The Real Thing	Charlotte	American Airlines Theare	76 performances	
2017	The Little Foxes	Birdie Hubbard / Regina Giddens	Samuel J. Friedman Theatre	87 performances	
2025	Marjorie Prime	Tess	Hayes Theater	96 performances	

== Awards and honors ==
Nixon has received numerous awards including two Primetime Emmy Awards, a Grammy Award, two Screen Actors Guild Awards, and two Tony Awards. She has also received several honors including the Muse Award presented by the New York Women in Film & Television in 2008, the Vito Russo Award presented by the GLAAD Media Awards in 2010, the Yale University Artist for Equality award in 2013 and the Faith Hubley Memorial Award during the Provincetown International Film Festival in 2016.

== See also ==
- LGBTQ culture in New York City
- List of LGBTQ people from New York City
