= How Doooo You Do!!! =

- Theatrical release poster
- Directed by: Ralph Murphy
- Screenplay by: Harry Sauber; Joseph Carole
- Story by: Harry Sauber
- Produced by: Harry Sauber
- Starring: Bert Gordon; Harry von Zell; Cheryl Walker; Ella Mae Morse; Frank Albertson; Claire Windsor
- Cinematography: Benjamin H. Kline
- Edited by: Thomas Neff
- Music by: Howard Jackson
- Production company: Producers Releasing Corporation
- Distributed by: Producers Releasing Corporation
- Release date: December 24, 1945
- Running time: 80 minutes
- Country: United States
- Language: English

How Doooo You Do!!! is a 1945 American comedy film directed by Ralph Murphy and written by Harry Sauber and Joseph Carole. The film stars Bert Gordon, Harry von Zell, Cheryl Walker, Ella Mae Morse, Frank Albertson and Claire Windsor. The film was released on December 24, 1945, by Producers Releasing Corporation.

== Plot ==
Murder occurs when several of the most popular radio personalities of the '40s converge on a desert resort.

== Cast ==
- Bert Gordon as himself
- Harry von Zell as himself
- Cheryl Walker as herself
- Ella Mae Morse as herself
- Frank Albertson as Tom Brandon
- Claire Windsor as herself
- Charles Middleton as Sheriff Hayworth
- Matt McHugh as Deputy McNiel
- Francis Pierlot as Proprietor
- Sidney Marion as Dr. Kolmar
- Keye Luke as himself
- Thomas E. Jackson as himself
- James Burke as himself
- Fred Kelsey as himself
- Leslie Denison as himself
- Eddie Kane as himself
- Harlow Wilcox as himself
