= John Beal (actor) =

American actor (1909–1997)

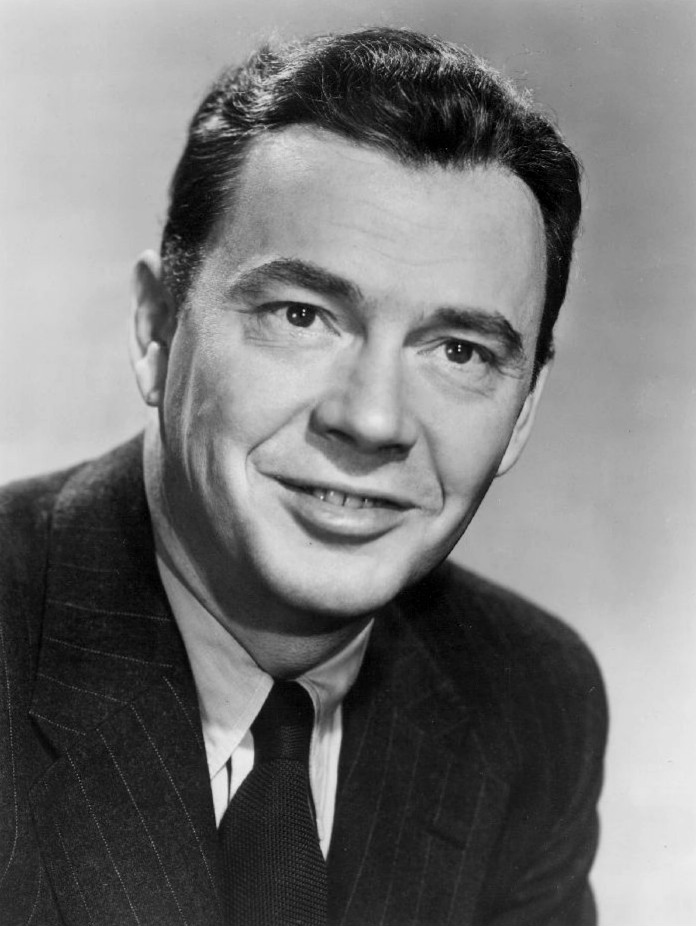
- Beal in 1960
- Born: James Alexander Bliedung; August 13, 1909; Joplin, Missouri, U.S.
- Died: April 26, 1997 (aged 87); Santa Cruz, California, U.S.
- Education: University of Pennsylvania
- Occupations: Film, stage, and television actor
- Years active: 1931–1993
- Spouse: Helen Craig (m. 1934; died 1986)
- Children: 2

John Beal (born James Alexander Bliedung, August 13, 1909 – April 26, 1997) was an American actor.

== Early life ==
Beal was born James Alexander Bliedung in Joplin, Missouri. His father had a department store and Beal went to the Wharton School of the University of Pennsylvania "mapped for a commercial career." While at Wharton, Beal (who enrolled under his real name, James Alexander Bliedung) spent time drawing cartoons for the school's humor magazine and singing in productions of the Mask and Wig club.

== Stage ==
Soon after graduating from college in 1930, Beal began acting with the Hedgerow Theatre. Beal originally went to New York to study at the Art Students League of New York. A chance to understudy in a play made him change his mind. He went on to appear in Russet Mantle and She Loves Me. Beal's Broadway credits include Three Men on a Horse (1993), The Seagull (1992), The Master Builder (1992), A Little Hotel on the Side (1992), The Crucible (1991), The Changing Room (1973), The Candyapple (1970), Our Town (1969), In the Matter of J. Robert Oppenheimer (1969), Billy (1969), Calculated Risk (1962), The Teahouse of the August Moon (1953), Leonard Sillman's New Faces of 1952 (1952), The Voice of the Turtle (1943), Liberty Jones (1941), I Know What I Like (1939), Miss Swan Expects (1939), Soliloquy (1938), Russet Mantle (1936), She Loves Me Not (1933), Another Language (1933), Another Language (1932), Wild Waves (1932), and No More Frontier (1931).

== Film ==
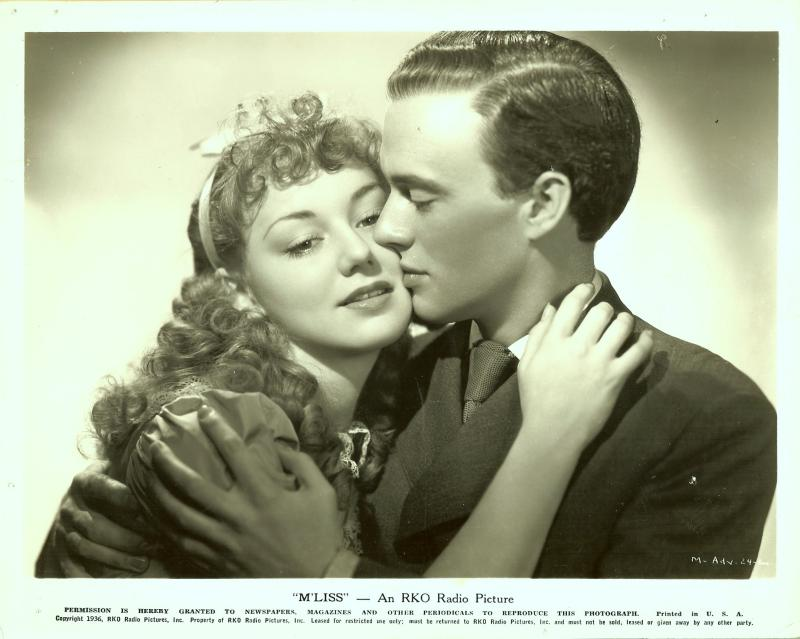
John Beal and Anne Shirley in 1936.

Beal began acting in films with Another Language (1933), in which he recreated his stage role. He appeared opposite Katharine Hepburn (in the 1934 RKO film The Little Minister), among others; one of his notable screen appearances was as Marius Pontmercy in Les Misérables (1935). He continued appearing in films during the war years, while serving in Special Services and the First Motion Picture Unit as actor and director of Army Air Forces camp shows and training films.

Beal had starring roles in the film dramas Alimony (1949) and My Six Convicts (1952).

== Radio and television ==
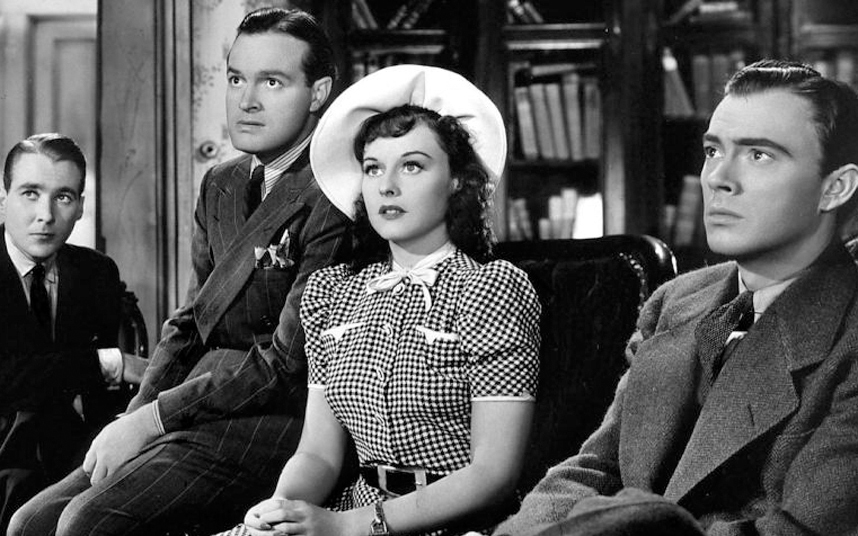
Douglass Montgomery, Bob Hope, Paulette Goddard and Beal in The Cat and the Canary (1939)

During the summer of 1948, Beal acted in The Amazing Mr. Tutt on CBS radio.

Beal was host of Freedom Rings, a game show on CBS-TV in 1953. In the 1950s, Beal also began appearing in various television shows, including the title role of mining engineer Philip Deidesheimer in a 1959 episode of Bonanza, "The Deidesheimer Story". Beal starred as Dr. Lewis on the ABC serial Road to Reality in 1960–1961. He portrayed Dr. Henden on the primetime medical drama The Nurses in the early 1960s and appeared on an afternoon version of the program in the latter half of the 1960s.

He was hired to play the role of Jim Matthews in the television soap opera Another World when the show went on the air in 1964, but was fired by creator and headwriter Irna Phillips after only one episode.

He appeared in The Waltons, season 3, episode 13, "The Visitor", first aired in December, 1974. His character was a former neighbor, Mason Beardsley, an elderly man who returned to Waltons Mountain to live with his wife who he was expecting in a few days. The Walton family were excited for him and helped to fix up his home, only to learn that his wife had died a year earlier and, unable to accept this fact, he continued to look for her.

In 1976, Beal portrayed Charles Francis Adams Sr. in the PBS dramatic series The Adams Chronicles. He continued to work in films and television, notably as Judge Vail in the supernatural soap opera Dark Shadows (for 9 episodes), and also the theater up until the 1980s. Beal died at age 87 in Santa Cruz, California, two years after suffering a stroke.

== Personal life ==
Beal was married to actress Helen Craig for 52 years until her death in 1986. They had two daughters.

== Filmography ==
Year	Title	Role	Notes
1933	Another Language	Jerry Hallam	
1934	Hat, Coat and Glove	Jerry Hutchins	
1934	The Little Minister	Gavin	
1935	Laddie	Laddie Stanton	
1935	Les Misérables	Marius	directed by Richard Boleslavsky
1935	Break of Hearts	Johnny Lawrence	
1936	M'Liss	Stephen Thorne	
1937	We Who Are About to Die	John E. 'Johnny' Thompson	
1937	The Man Who Found Himself	Dr. James Stanton Jr.	
1937	Border Cafe	Keith Whitney	
1937	Madame X	Raymond Fleuriot	
1937	Double Wedding	Waldo Beaver	
1937	Danger Patrol	Dan Loring	
1937	Beg, Borrow or Steal	Count Bill Cherau	
1938	Port of Seven Seas	Marius	
1938	I Am the Law	Paul Ferguson	
1938	The Arkansas Traveler	John 'Johnnie' Daniels	
1939	The Great Commandment	Joel	
1939	The Cat and the Canary	Fred Blythe	
1941	Ellery Queen and the Perfect Crime	Walter Matthews	
1941	Doctors Don't Tell	Dr. Ralph Sawyer	
1942	One Thrilling Night	Horace Jason	
1942	Atlantic Convoy	Carl Hansen	
1942	Stand By All Networks	Ben Fallon	
1943	Let's Have Fun	Richard Gilbert	
1943	Edge of Darkness	Johann Stensgard	
1947	Key Witness	Milton Higby	
1947	Messenger of Peace	Pastor Armin Ritter	
1948	So Dear to My Heart	Jeremiah as an Adult - Narrator	Voice
1949	Alimony	Dan Barker	
1949	Song of Surrender	Dubois	
1949	Chicago Deadline	Paul Jean d'Ur	
1952	My Six Convicts	Dr. Wilson aka Doc	
1953	Remains to Be Seen	Dr. Glenson	
1954	New Faces		director of sketches
1954	Studio One	"Twelve Angry Men" (TV episode)	Juror No. 2
1957	The Vampire	Dr. Paul Beecher	
1957	That Night!	Commuter Christopher J. Bowden	
1959	The Sound and the Fury	Howard Compson	
1959	Bonanza	Philip Diedesheimer	Episode: "The Phillip Diedesheimer Story"
1960	Ten Who Dared	Maj. John Wesley Powell	
1973	The Bride	Father	
1975	The Legend of Lizzie Borden	Dr. Bowen	TV movie
1976	The Adams Chronicles	Charles Francis Adams	3 episodes
1983	Amityville 3-D	Harold Caswell	
1993	The Firm	Nathan Locke	
