= Denver Center for the Performing Arts =

Nonprofit organization in Denver, US

Coordinates: 39.744623°N 104.998476°W

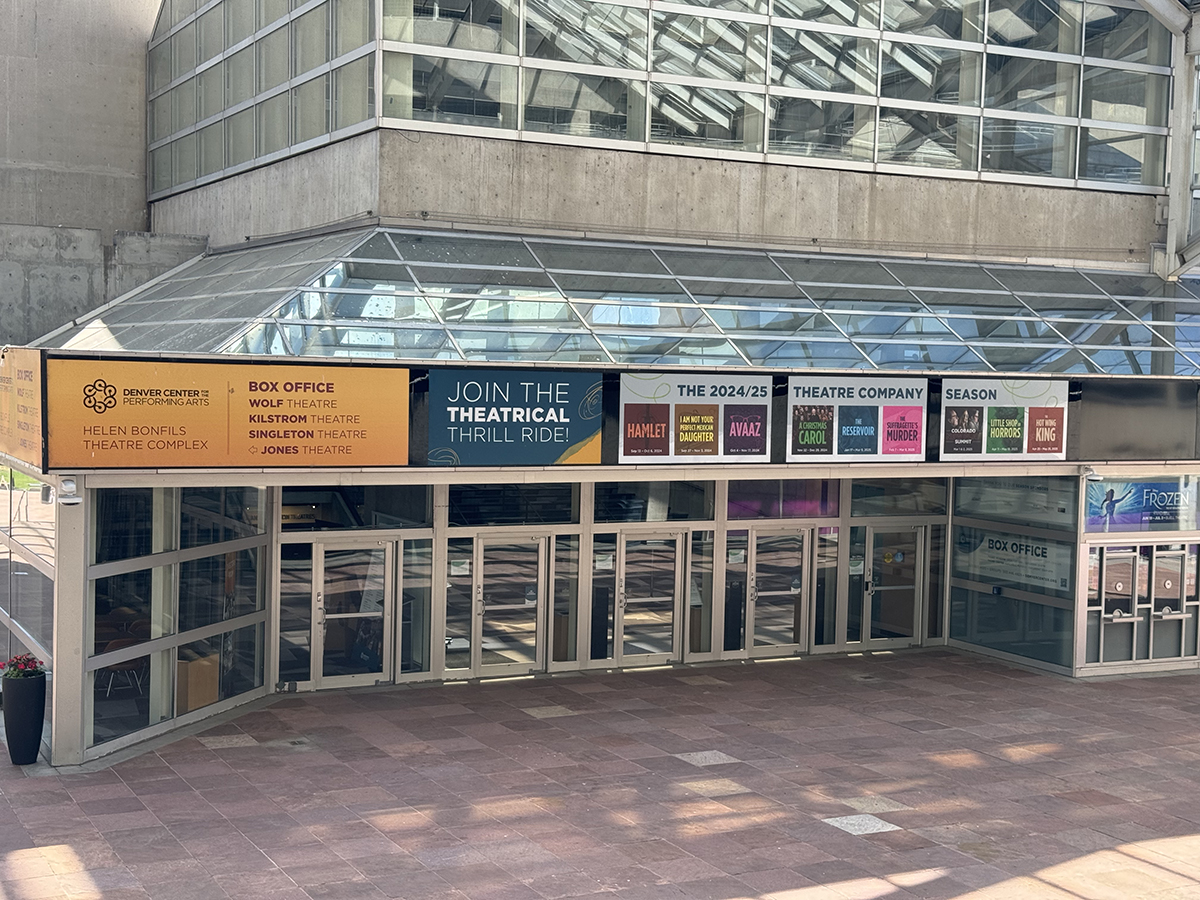
- Helen Bonfils Theatre Complex
- Founded: 1972
- Type: Theatre production, Broadway presenting, arts education
- Legal status: Nonprofit theatre organization
- Location(s): 14th & Curtis in downtown's Arts Complex
- President & CEO: Janice Sinden
- Website: www.denvercenter.org

The Denver Center for the Performing Arts (DCPA) is a nonprofit theatre organization based in Denver, Colorado. It presents Broadway tours as well as locally produced plays and musicals. It also develops new works for the American theatre, offers arts education programs, and manages several rental venues. The DCPA was founded in 1972 by Donald R. Seawell.

The DCPA’s programs include Broadway presentations, cabaret performances, Denver Center Theatre Company productions, venue rentals, education programs, and community engagement initiatives.

Its artistic and administrative headquarters are located at 1101 13th Street in the historic Tramway Building, while productions take place in the Denver Performing Arts Complex, a four-block, 12-acre campus in downtown Denver. Touring musicals and cabaret shows are staged in the Temple Hoyne Buell and Garner Galleria theatres, respectively, both operated by Denver Arts & Venues. The DCPA manages the Randy Weeks Conservatory Theatre, home to its annual Theatre for Young Audiences production, and the Helen Bonfils Theatre Complex, which houses Denver Center Theatre Company productions. The Bonfils Complex contains four venues: the Marvin & Judi Wolf, Dorota & Kevin Kilstrom, William Dean Singleton, and Glenn R. Jones theatres.

As of 2025, the organization reported annual revenue of approximately $89.3 million and employs approximately 300 staff, supplemented by seasonal artists and educators. According to company materials, its programs collectively reach nearly one million attendees each year.

== History ==
The Denver Center for the Performing Arts was founded in 1972 by Donald R. Seawell, a former New York attorney and theatrical producer. In the 1960s, Seawell produced Broadway plays through Bonard Productions, a company he co-founded with actress Halia Stoddard and Denver Post owner and philanthropist Helen Bonfils. During a corporate control dispute involving The Denver Post, Bonfils brought Seawell to Denver to represent her interests and later appointed him publisher of the newspaper. Following Bonfils’ death in 1972, Seawell sold the newspaper and directed proceeds from the sale through the Helen G. Bonfils Foundation toward the establishment of a professional theatre organization in Denver.

What is now known as the Denver Performing Arts Complex was developed during the 1970s as a centralized campus for multiple arts organizations in downtown Denver. Initially, the DCPA managed the four-block, 12-acre site, but in the early 1980s, management of most of the campus and its venues was transferred to the city, allowing the DCPA to focus more directly on theatrical production and programming. The organization retained management of the Helen Bonfils Theatre Complex, a group of performance spaces that were originally known as the Stage, Space, Ricketson, and Lab theatres and are now named for Marvin & Judi Wolf, William Dean Singleton, Dorota & Kevin Kilstrom, and Glenn R. Jones.

An early milestone for the DCPA was the World Theatre Festival in 1982, an international event featuring performances by theatre companies from 13 countries over 25 days, which helped bring wider attention to Denver as a theatrical destination.

The Denver Center Theatre Company (DCTC), the organization’s resident professional theatre company, began performances on December 31, 1979. In its early years, the Theatre Company established itself as a leading regional company, producing a mix of classical and contemporary works as well as original productions created in Denver. Around the same period, the DCPA expanded its role as a presenter of touring productions through a partnership with Robert Garner Attractions, helping establish Denver as a major market for Broadway touring productions. Over time, the organization developed a dual role as both a producer of original theatrical work and a presenter of national touring productions, including pre-Broadway engagements and national tour launches, with many Theatre Company productions going on to subsequent productions in other cities. The Theatre Company’s artistic contributions were recognized with the 1998 Tony Award for Outstanding Regional Theatre.

By the late 20th century, the DCPA expanded its programs beyond theatre production and touring presentations. The organization introduced acting instruction and education programs in the early 1990s, later broadening its reach through student matinees, Theatre for Young Audiences productions, classes, playwriting programs, and school partnerships. It also expanded its programming to include cabaret-style performances, adding a dedicated line of smaller-scale theatrical offerings. Its new play development efforts grew during this period, culminating in the Colorado New Play Summit dedicated to the development of new works for the stage. At the same time, the addition of the Seawell Ballroom in the late 1990s marked the organization’s entry into event and venue rentals, further diversifying its operations.

Several additional initiatives throughout its history—such as the National Theatre Conservatory, Denver Center Media, the Wilbur James Gould Voice Research Center, and the nationally recognized Off-Center immersive program—were later discontinued as the organization’s programs and priorities evolved over time.

== Programs ==
=== Denver Center Theatre Company ===
The Denver Center Theatre Company (DCTC), founded in 1979, is the organization’s resident professional theatre company. It produces a season of plays and musicals each year, including classical works, contemporary plays, and original productions developed in Denver. The Theatre Company has been recognized for its contributions to American theatre, receiving the 1998 Tony Award for Outstanding Regional Theatre. Productions are staged in the Wolf, Kilstrom, Singleton, and Jones theatres located in the Helen Bonfils Theatre Complex within the downtown’s Arts Complex.

=== Broadway ===
The DCPA presents touring Broadway productions throughout the year. The program grew from a partnership with producer Robert Garner, who joined the organization in 1979 and helped establish Denver as a major market for national tours. The DCPA has hosted pre-Broadway engagements and national tour launches and is a regular stop on the Broadway touring circuit. Performances are held primarily in the Temple Hoyne Buell Theatre, located within the Denver Performing Arts Complex in downtown Denver.

=== Cabaret ===
The cabaret program features smaller-scale theatrical productions, including musicals, comedies, and revue-style performances presented in the Garner Galleria Theatre. The program was established in 1992 under the leadership of Broadway Executive Director Randy Weeks, with the opening of Forever Plaid. Performances range from short engagements to multi-year runs presented in a nightclub-style setting. Notable long-running productions have included Always...Patsy Cline (1995–1999) and I Love You, You're Perfect, Now Change (2000–2004), both of which were among the longest-running shows in Denver theatre history.

=== Education ===
The DCPA provides educational programs for students, educators, and the community. On-site programs include acting classes, professional training, student matinees, and Theatre for Young Audiences productions designed for pre-kindergarten through third-grade students. In-school options include Middle & High School Playwriting, Bobby G High School Musical Theatre Awards, and Shakespeare in the Parking Lot, among others. The department also supports community engagement initiatives, including free performances, low-cost classes, and participation in local events and festivals aimed at expanding access to the performing arts across the community.

=== Event Services ===
The DCPA operates event and venue services, providing spaces within the Helen Bonfils Theatre Complex and Newman Center for Theatre Education for private events, receptions, and performances. This area of programming began with the addition of the Seawell Ballroom in the late 1990s.

== Notable works and awards ==
The Denver Center for the Performing Arts has contributed to the development of new theatrical works in American theatre, with productions and programs that have received regional and national recognition.

The Denver Center Theatre Company received the 1998 Tony Award for Outstanding Regional Theatre in recognition of its body of work. Productions developed by the Theatre Company have subsequently been staged at regional theatres and other venues across the United States, reflecting the organization’s role in the development of new work.

Notable Theatre Company productions include Tantalus and The Laramie Project, both of which were named to TIME magazine’s “Top 10 Plays of 2000,” with The Laramie Project later adapted into an HBO film. Several works that premiered at the DCPA were subsequently staged Off-Broadway and received award recognition, including Quilters, which received five Tony Award nominations; It Ain’t Nothin’ But the Blues, which received four Tony Award nominations and three Drama Desk nominations; and The Reservoir, which received an Outer Critics Circle Award nomination for Outstanding New Play. Additionally, many productions—including The Book of Will, The Great Leap, American Mariachi, and Just Like Us—have been widely produced in regional theatre. Other works have been adapted for film, including The Whale, which premiered at the DCPA before being adapted into an Academy Award–winning motion picture.

The DCPA also plays a significant role in the Broadway touring industry, hosting pre-Broadway engagements and national tour launches. Productions including Disney’s The Little Mermaid and Frozen held engagements in Denver prior to their Broadway openings, while national tours of Disney’s The Lion King, The Book of Mormon, Pippin, If/Then, Dear Evan Hansen, and Kimberly Akimbo have launched from the city, contributing to the organization’s reputation as a major market for touring productions.

== Leadership ==
The Denver Center for the Performing Arts has been led by a series of executives since its founding in 1972. Donald R. Seawell served as chairman (1972–2006), establishing the organization and playing a key role in the development of the Denver Performing Arts Complex. He was succeeded by Daniel L. Ritchie (2007–2016) as chairman and chief executive officer who later separated the roles, appointing Scott Shiller as president and CEO. Shiller served briefly before Ritchie resumed executive leadership. Ritchie later appointed Janice Sinden as president and CEO (2016–present), becoming the first woman to lead the organization.

Leadership of the DCPA’s artistic programs has also shaped its development. In the Broadway and Cabaret divisions, producer Robert Garner played a key role in establishing Denver as a major market for touring productions, a role later continued by Randy Weeks (1989–2014), who was succeeded by John Ekeberg.

Within the Denver Center Theatre Company, founding artistic director Edward Payson Call established the company in 1979. He was succeeded after five years by interim artistic director Peter Hackett, followed by Donovan Marley (1984–2005) whose tenure expanded the company’s artistic scope and helped establish its new play development initiatives and education programming. Marley was followed by Kent Thompson (2005–2017), who introduced programs such as the Colorado New Play Summit and the Women’s Voices Fund, and later by Chris Coleman (2017–present), under whose leadership the company has continued to produce new works and contemporary plays.

== Facilities and venues ==
The Denver Center for the Performing Arts operates primarily within the Denver Performing Arts Complex in downtown Denver. While the complex is owned and largely managed by the City and County of Denver, the DCPA operates several key performance and event spaces within the 4-block, 12-acre campus.

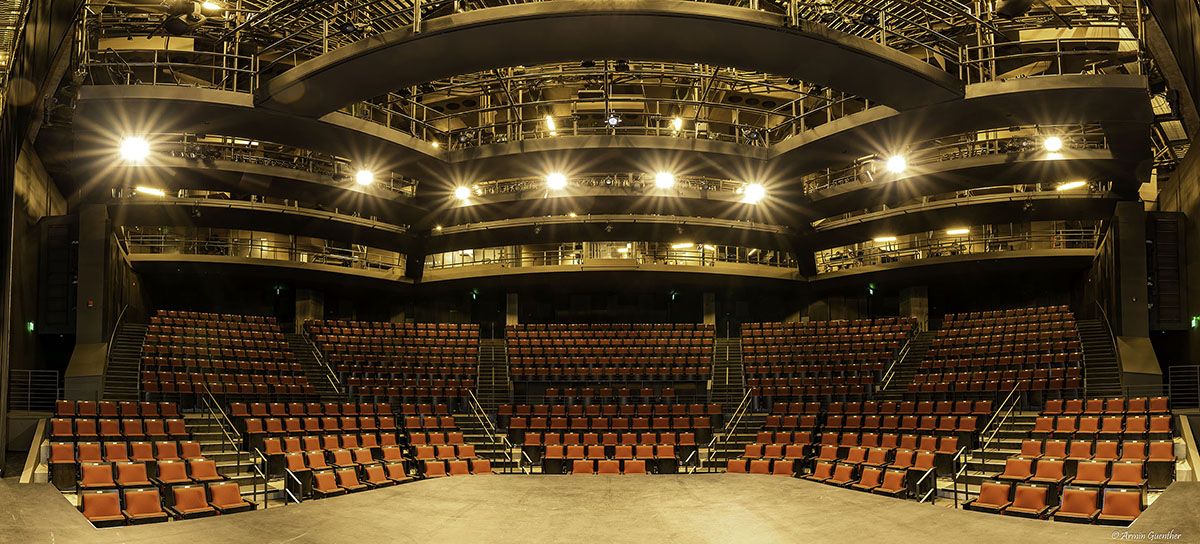
The Wolf Theatre, home to the Denver Center Theatre Company

The Helen Bonfils Theatre Complex is operated by the DCPA and houses the Denver Center Theatre Company’s stages, including the Wolf, Kilstrom, Singleton, and Jones theatres. The building also includes event spaces such as the Seawell Ballroom, which are used for fundraisers, events, and special occasions.

The Newman Center for Theatre Education is owned and managed by the DCPA. It houses the organization’s administrative offices, the Denver Center Theatre Company’s production facilities, and educational programs. The building, which was originally constructed as a maintenance facility for Denver’s early tramcar system, now includes rehearsal spaces, design studios, workshops, and classrooms used for training and community programs. The Weeks Conservatory Theatre hosts student productions and the DCPA’s annual Theatre for Young Audiences production.

The DCPA also presents productions in major venues within the complex, including the Temple Hoyne Buell Theatre and the Ellie Caulkins Opera House, which are owned and operated by the City and County of Denver. These venues are used for Broadway productions and national tours presented by the DCPA. The organization also manages the day-to-day operations of the Garner Galleria Theatre & Bar, which hosts its cabaret program.

== See also ==
- Denver Performing Arts Complex
