= GLAAD Vito Russo Award =

Annual LGBT media award presented by GLAAD

Vito Russo Award
- Country: United States
- Presented by: GLAAD
- First award: 1998; 28 years ago
- Currently held by: (2022)

The GLAAD Vito Russo Award is a special GLAAD Media Award presented annually by the Gay & Lesbian Alliance Against Defamation. It is named in honor of Vito Russo, a founding member of GLAAD, and presented to an openly LGBT media professional who has made a significant difference in promoting equality for the LGBT community.

== List of recipients ==
- 1992 – Jennie Livingston
- 1996 – The Celluloid Closet
- 1998 – k.d. lang
- 1999 – RuPaul

=== 2000s ===
- 2000 – Cecilia Dougherty
- 2001 – Liz Smith
- 2002 – Nathan Lane
- 2003 – Rosie O'Donnell
- 2004 – Cherry Jones
- 2005 – Alan Cumming
- 2006 – David LaChapelle
- 2007 – Tom Ford
- 2008 – Brian Graden
- 2009 – Suze Orman

=== 2010s ===
- 2010 – Cynthia Nixon
- 2011 – Ricky Martin
- 2012 – Craig Zadan and Neil Meron
- 2013 – Anderson Cooper
- 2014 – George Takei
- 2015 – Thomas Roberts
- 2017 – Billy Porter
- 2018 – Samira Wiley
- 2019 – Andy Cohen

=== 2020s ===
- 2022 – Wilson Cruz
- 2023 – Jonathan Van Ness
- 2024 – Orville Peck
