= The Little Foxes =

Play by Lillian Hellman

- First edition (1939)
- Original language: English
- Written by: Lillian Hellman
- Characters: Regina Giddens; Horace Giddens; Leo Hubbard; Oscar Hubbard
- Genre: Drama
- Setting: Alabama in 1900

Premiere
- Date: February 15, 1939
- Place: National Theatre; New York City

The Little Foxes is a 1939 play by Lillian Hellman, considered a classic of 20th century drama. Its title comes from Chapter 2, Verse 15, of the Song of Solomon in the King James version of the Bible, which reads, "Take us the foxes, the little foxes, that spoil the vines: for our vines have tender grapes." Set in a small town in Alabama in 1900, it focuses on the struggle for control of a family business. Tallulah Bankhead starred in the original production as Regina Hubbard Giddens.

== Plot ==
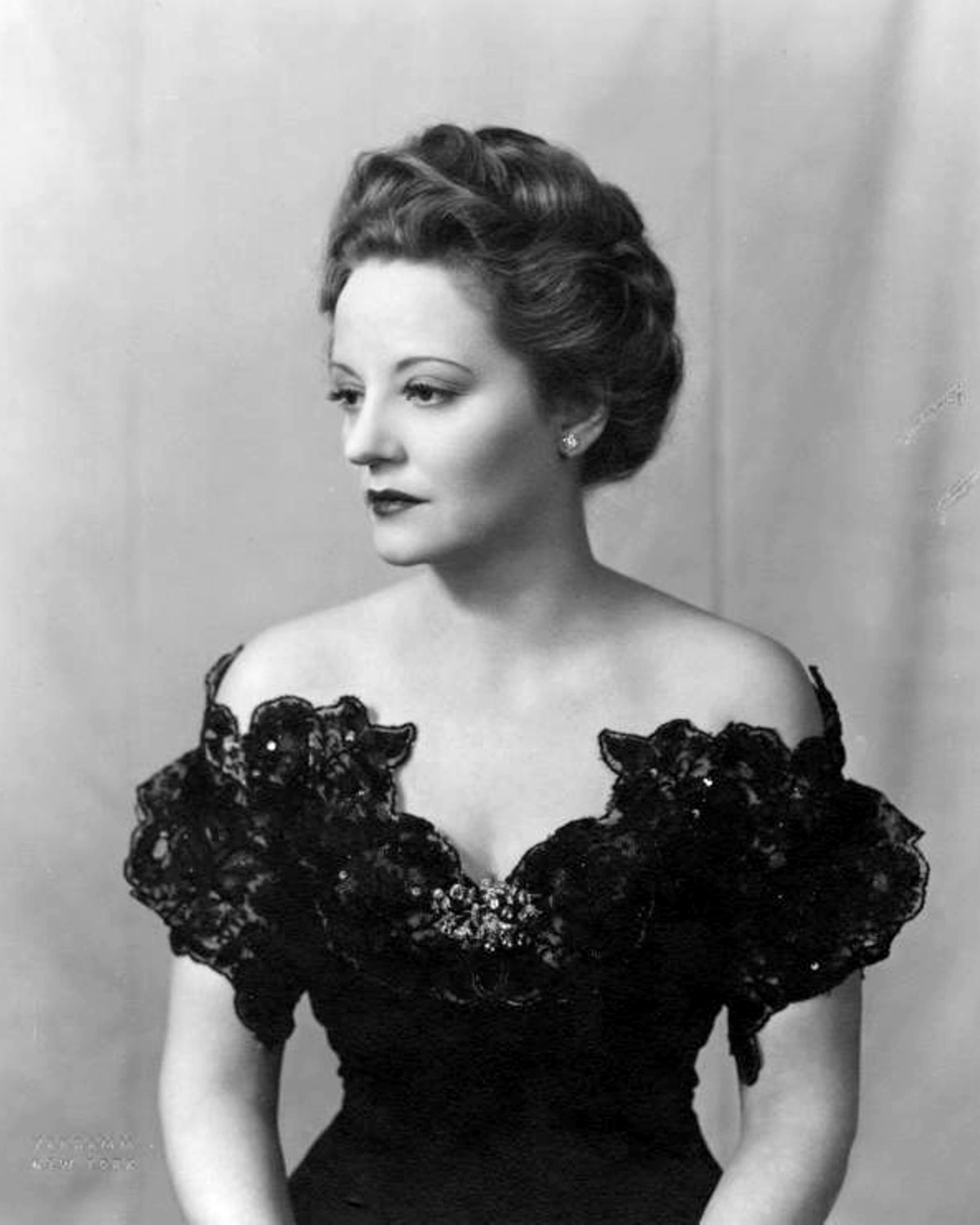
Tallulah Bankhead as Regina Giddens in The Little Foxes (1939)

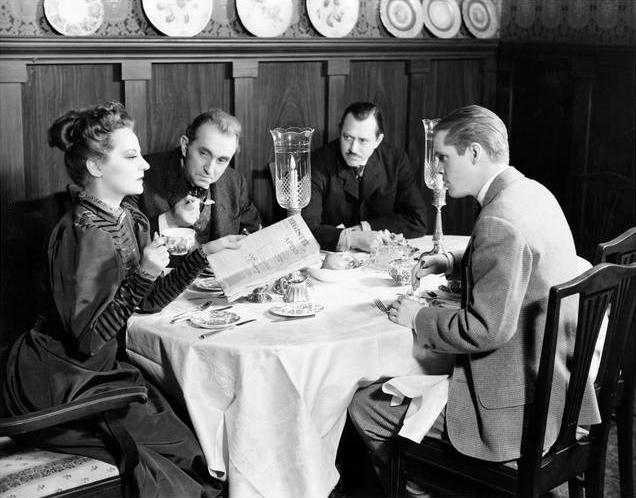
Tallulah Bankhead, Charles Dingle, Carl Benton Reid and Dan Duryea in the original Broadway production of The Little Foxes (1939)

The play's focus is Southerner Regina Hubbard Giddens, who struggles for wealth and freedom within the confines of an early 20th-century society where fathers considered only sons as their legal heirs. As a result of this practice, while her two avaricious brothers have wielded the family inheritance into two independently substantial fortunes, she has had to rely upon her manipulation of her cautious, timid, browbeaten husband, Horace. He is no businessman, just her financial support; although he is pliable enough for her ambition, that ambition has driven him into becoming merely the tool of her insatiable greed.

Her brother Oscar married Birdie, his much-maligned alcoholic wife, solely to acquire her family's plantation and cotton fields. Oscar now wants to join forces with his brother, Benjamin, to construct a cotton mill. They need an additional $75,000 and approach Regina, asking her to invest in the project. Oscar initially proposes marriage between his son Leo and Regina's daughter Alexandra—first cousins—as a means of getting Horace's money, but Horace and Alexandra are repulsed by the suggestion, as is Birdie. Horace refuses when Regina asks him outright for the money, so Leo, a bank teller, is pressured into stealing Horace's railroad bonds from the bank's safe deposit box.

Horace, after discovering this, tells Regina he is going to change his will in favor of their daughter, and also claim he gave Leo the bonds as a loan, thereby cutting Regina out of the deal completely. When he has a heart attack during this chat, she makes no effort to help him. He dies within hours, without anyone knowing his plan and before changing his will. This leaves Regina free to blackmail her brothers by threatening to report Leo's theft unless they give her 75% ownership in the cotton mill. (It is, in Regina's mind, a fair exchange for the stolen bonds.) The price Regina ultimately pays for her evil deeds is the loss of her daughter's love and respect. Regina's actions cause Alexandra to finally understand the importance of not idly watching people do evil. She tells Regina she will not watch her be "one who eats the earth," and abandons her. Having let her husband die, alienated her brothers, and driven away her only child, Regina is left wealthy but completely alone.

== Background ==
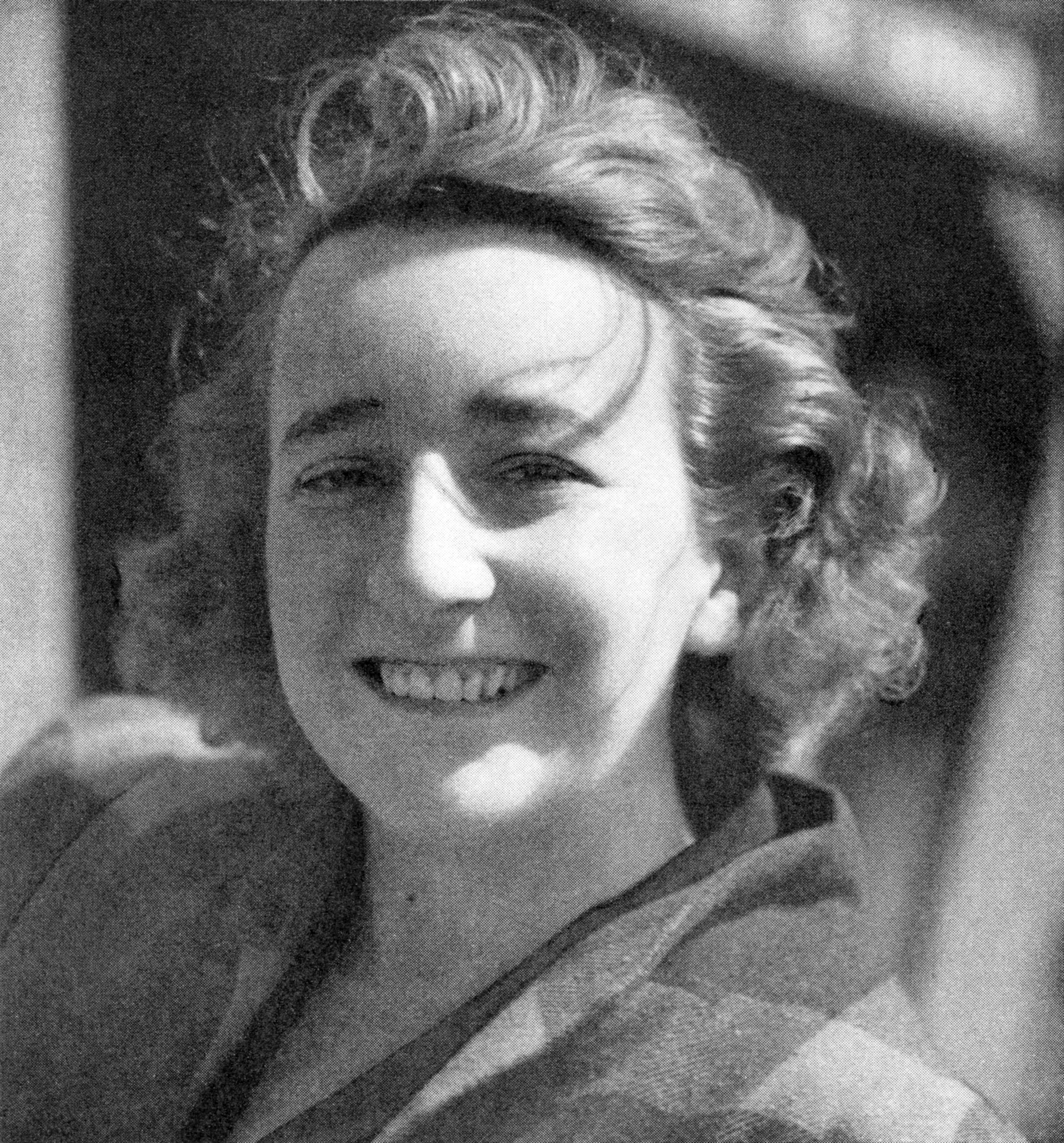
Lillian Hellman in 1939

The fictional Hubbards in the play are reputedly drawn from Lillian Hellman's Marx relatives. Hellman's mother was Julia Newhouse of Demopolis, Alabama. Julia Newhouse's parents were Leonard Newhouse, a Demopolis wholesale liquor dealer, and Sophie Marx, of a successful Demopolis banking family. According to Hellman, Sophie Marx Newhouse never missed an opportunity to belittle and mock her father for his poor business sense in front of her and her mother. The discord between the Marx and Hellman families was to later serve as the inspiration for the play.

The title "The Little Foxes" was suggested by Dorothy Parker.

In 1946, Hellman wrote Another Part of the Forest, a prequel chronicling the roots of the Hubbard family.

== Production ==
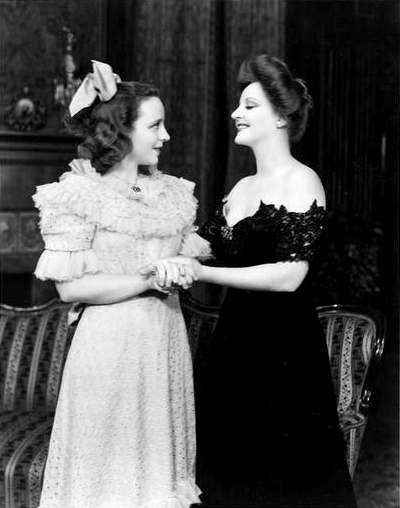
Eugenia Rawls (Alexandra) and Tallulah Bankhead (Regina) in the Broadway production of The Little Foxes (1939)

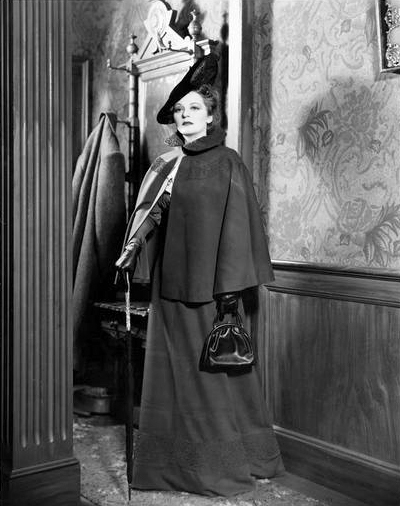
Bankhead played every performance of The Little Foxes on Broadway and on tour, and she was angry when Bette Davis was awarded the role of Regina in the 1941 motion picture.

Produced and directed by Herman Shumlin, the original Broadway production of The Little Foxes opened February 15, 1939, at the National Theatre. It closed February 3, 1940, running for 410 performances before its two-season tour of the United States.

Original promotional poster for the 1939 Broadway production, featuring Tallulah Bankhead

The main poster and playbill design (yellow background with red and black lettering and the tagline "The Greatest Play of the Generation" over a circular photo of Bankhead in character) was closely referenced over eight decades later for the promotional materials for the satirical comedy Oh, Mary!.

=== Cast ===
- Tallulah Bankhead as Regina Hubbard Giddens
- Patricia Collinge as Birdie Hubbard
- Frank Conroy as Horace Giddens
- Lee Baker as William Marshall
- Charles Dingle as Benjamin Hubbard
- Dan Duryea as Leo Hubbard
- John Marriott as Cal
- Abbie Mitchell as Addie
- Carl Benton Reid as Oscar Hubbard
- Florence Williams as Alexandra Giddens

On October 30, 1939, Eugenia Rawls replaced Florence Williams in the role of Alexandra Giddens. Rawls had made her Broadway debut as one of the students in Lillian Hellman's 1934 play, The Children's Hour, which was also produced and directed by Herman Shumlin. Rawls played Alexandra for the rest of the play's Broadway run and the national tour that followed.

The 104-city tour of The Little Foxes began February 5, 1940, in Washington, D.C., and ended April 15, 1941, in Philadelphia.

=== Accolades ===
Tallulah Bankhead won Variety magazine's citation as best actress of the 1938–39 Broadway season.

== Adaptations ==
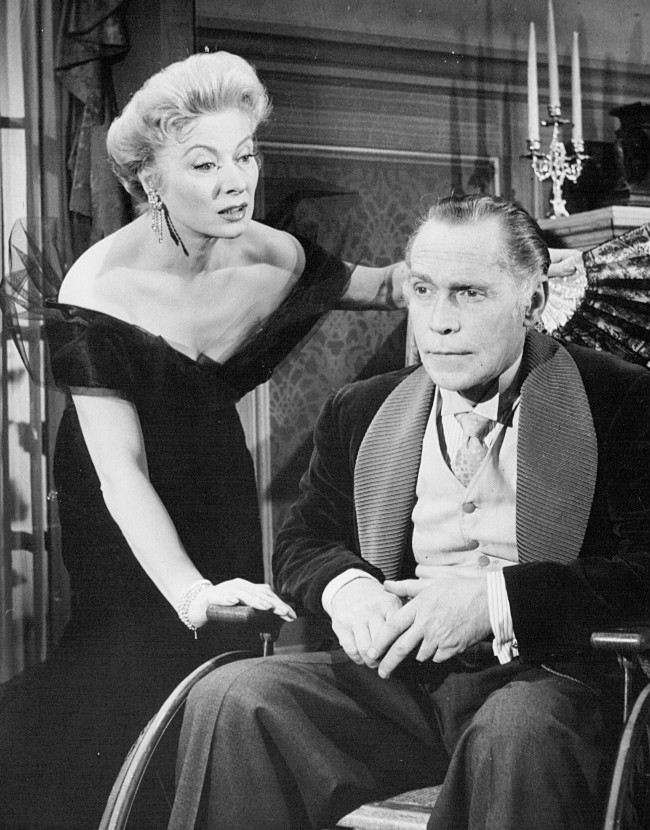
Greer Garson and Franchot Tone in the 1956 Hallmark Hall of Fame TV adaptation of The Little Foxes

Lillian Hellman wrote the screenplay for a 1941 film version, a Samuel Goldwyn production directed by William Wyler. Other contributors to the screenplay included Arthur Kober, Dorothy Parker and Alan Campbell. The touring production of The Little Foxes went on hiatus for three months during filming, and Patricia Collinge, Charles Dingle, Dan Duryea, John Marriott and Carl Benton Reid all reprised their stage roles in their motion picture debuts. Bette Davis, Herbert Marshall and Teresa Wright star as Regina, Horace and Alexandra Giddens.

The Little Foxes was presented on Philip Morris Playhouse October 10, 1941. The radio adaptation starred Tallulah Bankhead.

In 1949, the play was adapted for an opera entitled Regina by Marc Blitzstein.

George Schaefer produced and directed Robert Hartung's television adaptation of The Little Foxes for the Hallmark Hall of Fame, broadcast December 16, 1956, on NBC. The cast included Greer Garson (Regina), Franchot Tone (Horace), Sidney Blackmer (Ben), E. G. Marshall (Oscar) and Eileen Heckart (Birdie).

== Revivals ==
Mike Nichols directed a production that opened October 26, 1967, at the Vivian Beaumont Theater in Lincoln Center, then transferred to the Ethel Barrymore Theatre. It ran a total of 100 performances. The cast included Anne Bancroft as Regina, Richard A. Dysart as Horace, Margaret Leighton as Birdie, E.G. Marshall as Oscar, George C. Scott as Benjamin, and Austin Pendleton as Leo. Costume design was by Patricia Zipprodt. In reviewing the production, Time said, "An admirable revival of Lillian Hellman's 1939 play in Lincoln Center demonstrates how securely bricks of character can be sealed together with the mortar of plot. Anne Bancroft, George C. Scott, Richard Dysart, and Margaret Leighton are expertly guided by Director Mike Nichols through gilt-edged performances." The production was profiled in the William Goldman book The Season: A Candid Look at Broadway.

Geraldine Page played Regina in a production in which she starred opposite her husband Rip Torn (in the role of Benjamin Hubbard) directed by Philip Minor. It was staged for the Academy Festival Theater at Barat College in Lake Forest, Illinois and received a rave review from William Leonard of the Chicago Tribune: "Geraldine Page is giving one of the greatest performances of her glorious career in Lake Forest and she is surrounded by a cast so superb that the Academy Festival Theater's production of "The Little Foxes" becomes a powerful, searing, unforgettable show... it is a harrowing and ennobling evening in the theater-the kind that comes along all too seldom. We have seen other stars in the role of the malevolently, ruthlessly scheming Regina Giddens—Tallulah Bankhead years ago in her greatest triumph, Eileen Herlie five seasons back at the Ivanhoe. Geraldine Page is a whole new story—I have seen Geraldine Page in innumerable roles, ever since she was playing in East Lynne with the Lake Zurich Players back in the '40s. I've never seen her more thrillingly convincing than in this production." The legendary Kim Stanley once said of Page's Regina that it "was possibly the finest performance" she had ever seen.

Austin Pendleton directed a production at the Parker Playhouse in Fort Lauderdale for three weeks that transferred to the Kennedy Center in Washington, D.C., for six weeks before opening on Broadway. The production opened on May 7, 1981, at the Martin Beck Theatre for 123 performances and eight previews. The cast included Elizabeth Taylor as Regina, Tom Aldredge as Horace, Dennis Christopher as Leo, Maureen Stapleton as Birdie, and Anthony Zerbe as Benjamin. Florence Klotz was the costume designer. In a Time article prior to the Broadway opening, Gerald Clarke reported nearly $1 million worth of ticket sales during the week after advertisements announcing Taylor's appearance appeared in The New York Times. Taylor received nominations for both the Tony Award for Best Performance by a Leading Actress in a Play and the Drama Desk Award for Outstanding Actress in a Play. Tony nominations also went to Pendleton for Best Direction of a Play, Aldredge for Best Featured Actor in a Play, Stapleton for Best Featured Actress in a Play, and the play itself for Best Revival.

A 1997 revival, again at the Vivian Beaumont, ran for 27 previews and 57 performances from April 3 to June 15. Directed by Jack O'Brien, the cast included Stockard Channing as Regina, Kenneth Welsh as Horace, Brian Kerwin as Oscar, Brian Murray as Benjamin, and Frances Conroy as Birdie. Murray was nominated for the Tony Award for Best Featured Actor in a Play and won the Drama Desk Award for Outstanding Featured Actor in a Play, and John Lee Beatty was nominated for the Tony Award for Best Scenic Design.

The production was revived at The Shakespeare Theatre of New Jersey, from June 3 to 28, 2009, with Venida Evans, Ron Brice, Deanne Lorette, Brian Dykstra, Fisher Neal, Kathryn Meisle, Einar Gunn, Philip Goodwin, Lindsey Wochley, Bradford Cover, and directed by Matthew Arbour.

Another revival was produced by Cleveland Play House in the 75th anniversary year of the original Broadway production, September 12–October 5, 2014, in the Allen Theatre (Playhouse Square) in Cleveland. The production was directed by Artistic Director Laura Kepley.

Kyle Donnelly directed a revival at Washington, DC's Arena Stage from September 23 to October 30, 2016. The cast included Marg Helgenberger, Edward Gero, Isabel Keating, and Jack Willis.

Manhattan Theatre Club produced a Broadway revival that began previews on March 29, 2017, and opened officially on April 19 at the Samuel J. Friedman Theatre. It starred Laura Linney (who was nominated for a Tony Award—Performance by a Leading Actress in a Play) and Cynthia Nixon who alternated the roles of Regina Giddens and Birdie, with direction by Daniel J. Sullivan. Cynthia Nixon won the Tony Award for Featured Actress in a Play for her turn as Birdie. The production team included Scott Pask, Justin Townsend, Jane Greenwood, Fotz Patton, and Tom Watson. It played its final performance on July 2, 2017.

The Gate Theatre in Dublin, was planning a revival in 2020, directed by Blanche McIntyre, but this was postponed due to the COVID-19 pandemic.

The Young Vic in London produced a three-month revival that opened December 2, 2024 starring Anne-Marie Duff as Regina.
