= List of films shot in Almería =

Here are the films or scenes from films shot in Almería, Spain:

== 1940–1949 ==
- La Alcazaba de Almería (1943 documentary film black and white 10 min directed by Vicente Zaragoza)

== 1950–1959 ==
- The Call of Africa (1952 by César Fernández Ardavín with Irma Torres, Ángel Picazo, Tomas Blanco, Gérard Tichy, Mayrata O'Wisisedo)
- Judas' Kiss (1954 by Rafael Gil with Rafael Rivelles, Francisco Rabal, Gérard Tichy, Fernando Sancho, José Nieto)
- Cursed Mountain (1954 by Antonio del Amo with Rubén Rojo, Lina Rosales, José Guardiola, José Sepulveda, Manuel Zarzo)
- Nicht mehr fliehen (1955 by Herbert Vesely with Judith Folda, Xenia Hagmann, Héctor Mayro)
- An Eye for an Eye (1957 by André Cayatte with Curd Jürgens, Folco Lulli, Paul Frankeur, Lea Padovani, Pascale Audret, Darío Moreno)
- Residencias y Ambulatorios del Seguro de Enfermedad (1957 documentary film 20 min by Christian Anwander with Matías Prats)
- The Night Heaven Fell (1958 by Roger Vadim with Brigitte Bardot, Alida Valli, Stephen Boyd, José Nieto, Fernando Rey)
- Soledad (1959 by Mario Craveri & Enrico Gras with Fernando Fernán Gómez, Pilar Cansino, Germán Cobos, Mercedes Alonso, Manuel Calvo)
- The Death Ship (1959 by Georg Tressler with Horst Buchholz, Mario Adorf, Elke Sommer)
- Duelo en la cañada (1959 by Manuel Mur Oti with Mary Esquivel, Javier Armet, Mara Cruz, Leo Anchóriz, Candida Losada, Pastora Imperio)

== 1960–1969 ==
- Taxi for Tobruk (1961 by Denys de La Patellière with Lino Ventura, Hardy Krüger, Charles Aznavour)
- Goliath Against the Giants (1961 by Guido Malatesta with Brad Harris, Gloria Milland, Fernando Rey, Fernando Sancho)
- King of Kings (1961 by Nicholas Ray with Jeffrey Hunter, Robert Ryan, Siobhán McKenna, Frank Thring, Hurd Hatfield)
- El Cid (1961 by Anthony Mann with Charlton Heston, Sophia Loren)
- Savage Guns (1962 by Michael Carreras with Richard Basehart, Paquita Rico, Don Taylor, Alex Nicol, Fernando Rey)
- Commando (1962 by Frank Wisbar with Stewart Granger, Dorian Gray, Carlos Casaravilla, Ivo Garrani, Alfredo Mayo)
- Terrible Sheriff (1962 by Alberto De Martino & Antonio Momplet with Walter Chiari)
- Lawrence of Arabia (1962 by David Lean with Peter O'Toole, Omar Sharif, Alec Guinness, Anthony Quinn, Jack Hawkins, José Ferrer, Claude Rains, Arthur Kennedy)
- Tierra de Fuego (1962 documentary film 10 min by José Luis Font)
- Cleopatra (1963 by Joseph L. Mankiewicz with Elizabeth Taylor, Richard Burton, Rex Harrison, Pamela Brown, George Cole)
- Duello nel Texas (1963 by Ricardo Blasco with Richard Harrison, Giacomo Rossi-Stuart, Mikaela, Sara Lezana, Daniel Martin)
- La Conquista del Pacífico (1963 by José María Elorrieta with Frank Latimore, Pilar Cansino, Carlos Casaravilla, Jésus Puente, Mario Morales, Alberto Berco)
- Greed in the Sun (1964 by Henri Verneuil with Jean-Paul Belmondo, Lino Ventura, Reginald Kernan, Bernard Blier, Gert Fröbe, Andréa Parisy)
- Three Ruthless Ones (1964 by Joaquín Luis Romero Marchent with Richard Harrison, Fernando Sancho, Robert Hundar, Miguel Palenzuela, Gloria Milland)
- Fuera de la Ley (1964 by León Klimovsky with George Martin, Jack Taylor, Juny Brunell, Tomas Blanco, Alberto Dalbés)
- Backfire (1964 by Jean Becker with Jean-Paul Belmondo, Jean Seberg, Gert Fröbe, Fernando Rey, Jean-Pierre Marielle, Enrico Maria Salerno, Wolfgang Preiss, Fernando Sancho)
- A Fistful of Dollars (1964 by Sergio Leone with Clint Eastwood, Marianne Koch, Gian Maria Volonté, Antonio Prieto, José Calvo)
- Bullets Don't Argue (1964 by Mario Caiano with Rod Cameron, Ángel Aranda, Horst Frank, Vivi Bach, Luis Durán) – in Lucainena de las Torres
- The Seven from Texas (1964 by Joaquín Luis Romero Marchent with Paul Piaget, Robert Hundar, Fernando Sancho, Gloria Milland, Jesús Puente)
- Minnesota Clay (1964 by Sergio Corbucci with Cameron Mitchell, Georges Rivière, Ethel Rojo, Diana Martín, Antonio Roso)
- Gunmen of the Rio Grande (1964 by Tulio Demicheli with Guy Madison, Madeleine Lebeau, Carolyn Davis, Fernando Sancho, Gérard Tichy)
- Saul y David (1964 by Marcello Baldi with Norman Wooland, Gianni Garko, Elisa Cegani, Virgílio Teixeira, Pilar Clemens)
- Toto of Arabia (1965 by José Antonio de la Loma with Totò, Nieves Navarro, George Rigaud, Fernando Sancho, Mario Castellani, Luigi Pavese)
- Finger on the Trigger (1965 by Sidney W. Pink with Rory Calhoun, James Philbrook, Silvia Solar, Leo Anchóriz)
- Masquerade (1965 by Basil Dearden with Cliff Robertson, Jack Hawkins, Marisa Mell, Michel Piccoli, Bill Fraser)
- Der letzte Mohikaner (1965 by Harald Reinl with Daniel Martin, Karin Dor, Joachim Fuchsberger, Antonio de Teffé, Carl Lange)
- A Pistol for Ringo (1965 by Duccio Tessari with Giuliano Gemma, Fernando Sancho, Lorella De Luca, Nieves Navarro, George Martin)
- The Hill (1965 by Sidney Lumet with Sean Connery, Harry Andrews, Ian Bannen, Alfred Lynch, Ossie Davis)
- Five Thousand Dollars on One Ace (1965 by Alfonso Balcázar with Robert Woods, Fernando Sancho, Helmut Schmid, Lorenzo Lobledo, Maria Sebaldt)
- The Dictator's Guns (1965 by Claude Sautet with Lino Ventura, Sylva Koscina, Alberto de Mendoza, Leo Gordon, Antonio Casas)
- The Hell of Manitoba (1965 by Sheldon Reynolds with Lex Barker, Pierre Brice, Gérard Tichy, Marianne Koch, Ángel del Pozo)
- Left Handed Johnny West (1965 by Gianfranco Parolini with Mimmo Palmara, Mara Cruz, Roberto Camardiel, Roger Delaporte, Andre Bollet)
- La magnifica sfida (1965 by Miguel Lluch with Kirk Morris, Aldo Sambrell, Dina Loy, Red Ross, Tomas Pico, Erika Jones)
- Wild Kurdistan (1965 by Franz Josef Gottlieb with Lex Barker, Marie Versini, Gustavo Rojo, Ralf Wolter, Dieter Borsche)
- Gideon and Samson: Great Leaders of the Bible (1965 by Marcello Baldi & Francisco Pérez-Dolz with Anton Geesink, Ivo Garanni, Fernando Rey, Maruchi Fresno, Luz Márquez)
- Agente S 03: Operazione Atlantide (1965 by Domenico Paolella with John Ericson, Cristina Gajoni, Berna Rock, Maria Granada, Carlo Hinterman)
- Train d'enfer (1965 by Gilles Grangier with Jean Marais, Marisa Mell, Antonio Casas, Gérard Tichy, Jean Lara)
- The Relentless Four (1965 by Primo Zeglio with Adam West, Robert Hundar, Paola Barbara, Ralph Balwyn, Renato Rossini)
- In a Colt's Shadow (1965 by Giovanni Grimaldi with Stephen Forsyth, Conrado San Martín, Anna Sherman, Frank Ressel, Pepe Calvo)
- For a Few Dollars More (1965 by Sergio Leone with Clint Eastwood, Lee Van Cleef, Gian Maria Volonté, Mara Krupp, Klaus Kinski)
- Adiós gringo (1965 by Giorgio Stegani with Giuliano Gemma, Ida Galli, Roberto Camardiel, Nello Pazzafini)
- A Coffin for the Sheriff (1965 by Mario Caiano with Anthony Steffen, Eduardo Fajardo, Armando Calvo, Jorge Rigaud, Lucian Galli)
- The Man, the Woman and the Money (1965 by Marco Ferreri, Luciano Salce & Eduardo De Filippo with Marcello Mastroianni, Catherine Spaak, Virna Lisi, Luciano Salce, Pamela Tiffin)
- Kingdom of the Silver Lion (1965 by Franz Josef Gottlieb with Lex Barker, Marie Versini, Gustavo Rojo, Fernando Sancho)
- Seven Guns for the MacGregors (1966 by Franco Giraldi with Robert Woods, Leo Anchóriz, Fernando Sancho, Agata Flori)
- Dollars for a Fast Gun (1966 by Joaquín Luis Romero Marchent with Robert Hundar, Pamela Tudor, José Bódalo, Jesús Puente, Roberto Camardiel)
- For One Thousand Dollars Per Day (1966 by Silvio Amadio with Zachary Hatcher, Rubén Rojo, Pier Angeli, Mimmo Palmara, José Calvo)
- That Man George (1966 by Jacques Deray with George Hamilton, Claudine Auger, Alberto de Mendoza, Renato Baldini, Roberto Camardiel)
- Lost Command (1966 by Mark Robson with Anthony Quinn, Alain Delon, Claudia Cardinale, George Segal, Michèle Morgan, Maurice Ronet)
- Per il gusto di uccidere (1966 by Tonino Valerii with Craig Hill, George Martin, Peter Carter, Franco Ressel, Fernando Sancho)
- Sharp-Shooting Twin Sisters (1966 by Rafael Romero Marchent with Pili y Mili, Sean Flynn, Renato Baldini, Maria Barbara, Rosa Bergamonti)
- Johnny Yuma (1966 by Romolo Guerrieri with Mark Damon, Lawrence Dobkin, Rosalba Neri, Luigi Vannucchi, Fidel Gonzales)
- Ringo, il volto della vendetta (1966 by Mario Caiano with Anthony Steffen, Frank Wolff, Eduardo Fajardo, Armando Calvo, Alejandra Nilo)
- Arizona Colt (1966 by Michele Lupo with Giuliano Gemma, Fernando Sancho, Corinne Marchand, Nello Pazzafini, Andrea Bosic)
- Texas, Adios (1966 by Ferdinando Baldi with Franco Nero, José Guardiola, Elisa Montés, Alberto Dell'Acqua, José Suárez)
- A Few Dollars for Django (1966 by León Klimovsky with Anthony Steffen, Gloria Osuna, Frank Wolff, Thomas Moore, José Luis Lluch)
- The Rat Patrol (1966–1968, TV series with Christopher George)
- Seven Vengeful Women (1966 by Rudolf Zehetgruber & Sidney W. Pink with Anne Baxter, Maria Perschy, Perla Cristal, Gustavo Rojo, Rosella Como)
- Sugar Colt (1966 by Franco Giraldi with Hunt Powers, Soledad Miranda, Julian Rafferty, Jeanne Oak, James Parker)
- Django Shoots First (1966 by Alberto De Martino with Glenn Saxson, Fernando Sancho, Ida Galli)
- The Bounty Killer (1966 by Eugenio Martín with Richard Wyler, Tomás Milián, Ilya Karin, Hugo Blanco, Glenn Foster, Manuel Zarzo)
- Navajo Joe (1966 by Sergio Corbucci with Burt Reynolds, Cris Huerta, Ángel Ortís, Lucio Rosato, Nicoletta Machiavelli)
- The Big Gundown (1966 by Sergio Sollima with Lee Van Cleef, Tomás Milián, Walter Barnes, Maria Granada, Fernando Sancho)
- A Bullet for the General (1966 by Damiano Damiani with Gian Maria Volonté, Lou Castel, Klaus Kinski, Martine Beswick, Jaime Fernández)
- Blood at Sundown (1966 by Alberto Cardone with Anthony Steffen, Gianni Garko, Erika Blanc, Carlo D'Angelo, Sieghardt Rupp)
- The Good, the Bad and the Ugly (1966 by Sergio Leone with Clint Eastwood, Eli Wallach, Lee Van Cleef, Luigi Pistilli, Rada Rassimov, Chelo Alonso)
- Gli amori di Angelica (1966 by Luigi Latini de Marchi with Claudie Lange, Joaquin Blanco, Damaso Muni, Aldo Berti, Carroll Breck)
- Rimal min dhahab (1966 by Youssef Chahine with Rubén Rojo, Elena María Tejeiro, Paul Barge, Faten Hamama, Carlos Muñoz)
- The Hellbenders (1967 by Sergio Corbucci with Joseph Cotten, Julián Mateos, John Ericson, Norma Bengell, Al Mulock, Aldo Sambrell)
- Tobruk (1967 by Arthur Hiller with Rock Hudson, George Peppard, Guy Stockwell, Nigel Green)
- Dynamite Joe (1967 by Antonio Margheriti with Rik Van Nutter, Halina Zalewska, Mercedes Castro, Renato Baldini, Santiago Rivero)
- Un hombre y un Colt (1967 by Tulio Demicheli with Robert Hundar, Fernando Sancho, Gloria Milland, Mirko Ellis, Marta Reves)
- Long Days of Vengeance (1967 by Florestano Vancini with Giuliano Gemma, Gabriella Giorgelli, Nieves Navarro, Francisco Rabal)
- Ten Thousand Dollars for a Massacre (1967 by Romolo Guerrieri with Gianni Garko, Loredana Nusciak, Fernando Sancho, Fidel Gonzales, Adriana Ambesi)
- I'll Kill Him and Return Alone (1967 by Julio Buchs with Peter Lee Lawrence, Fausto Tozzi, Gloria Milland, Dyanik Zurakowska, Miguel de la Riva)
- Wanted (1967 by Giorgio Ferroni with Giuliano Gemma, Teresa Gimpera, Serge Marquand, Germán Cobos, Daniele Vargas)
- Le Canard en fer blanc (1967 by Jacques Poitrenaud with Roger Hanin, Corinne Marchand, Andrés Mejuto, Lila Kedrova, Francis Blanche)
- Il magnifico texano (1967 by Luigi Capuano with Glenn Saxson, Massimo Serato, Luis Induni, Barbara Loy, Beni Deus, Gloria Osuna)
- Il tempo degli avvoltoi (1967 by Nando Cicero with George Hilton, Frank Wolff, Pamela Tudor, Franco Balducci, Eduardo Fajardo)
- Hate for Hate (1967 by Domenico Paolella with Antonio Sabàto, Sr., John Ireland, Mirko Ellis, Nadia Marconi, Fernando Sancho)
- Death Rides a Horse (1967 by Giulio Petroni with Lee Van Cleef, John Phillip Law, Luigi Pistilli, Anthony Dawson, Mario Brega)
- Any Gun Can Play (1967 by Enzo G. Castellari with Edd Byrnes, George Hilton, Gilbert Roland, Stefania Careddu, José Torres)
- How I Won the War (1967 by Richard Lester with Michael Crawford, John Lennon, Roy Kinnear, Lee Montague, Jack MacGowran)
- Halleluja for Django (1967 by Maurizio Lucidi with George Hilton, Walter Barnes, Jack Betts, Sarah Ross, Erika Blanc)
- God Forgives... I Don't! (1967 by Giuseppe Colizzi with Terence Hill, Bud Spencer, Frank Wolff, Gina Rovere, José Manuel Martin)
- Cervantes (1967 by Vincent Sherman with Horst Buchholz, Gina Lollobrigida, José Ferrer, Louis Jourdan, Francisco Rabal)
- Les Têtes brûlées (1967 by Willy Rozier with Lang Jeffries, Estella Blain, Philippe Clay, Jacques Dufilho, Jacques Dynam)
- Custer of the West (1967 by Robert Siodmak with Robert Shaw, Mary Ure, Ty Hardin, Jeffrey Hunter, Robert Ryan)
- John the Bastard (1967 by Armando Crispino with John Richardson, Claudio Camaso, Martine Beswick, Claudio Gora, Furio Meniconi)
- Face to Face (1967 by Sergio Sollima with Tomás Milián, Gian Maria Volonté, William Berger, Yolanda Modio, Carole André)
- Per 100.000 dollari ti ammazzo (1967 by Giovanni Fago with Gianni Garko, Claudio Camaso, Fernando Sancho)
- Red Blood, Yellow Gold (1967 by Nando Cicero with George Hilton, George Martin, Edward Byrnes, José Bódalo, Gérard Herter)
- Quindici forche per un assassino (1967 by Nunzio Malasomma with Craig Hill, George Martin, Susy Andersen, Eleonora Brown, Fernando Sancho)
- Day of Anger (1967 by Tonino Valerii with Giuliano Gemma, Lee Van Cleef, Yvonne Sanson, Christa Linder)
- Man, Pride and Vengeance (1967 by Luigi Bazzoni with Tina Aumont, Franco Nero, Klaus Kinski, Lee Burton, Alberto Dell'Acqua)
- Death Sentence (1968 by Mario Lanfranchi with Robin Clarke, Richard Conte, Tomás Milián, Adolfo Celi, Enrico Maria Salerno)
- Train for Durango (1968 by Mario Caiano with Anthony Steffen, Mark Damon, Enrico Maria Salerno, Dominique Boschero, José Bondalo)
- Un día después de agosto (1968 by German Lorente with Brett Halsey, Ilia Sushan, Cristina Galbó, Oscar Pellicer, Luis Induni)
- The Ruthless Four (1968 by Giorgio Capitani with Van Heflin, Gilbert Roland, Klaus Kinski, George Hilton, Sarah Ross)
- Johnny Hamlet (1968 by Enzo G. Castellari with Andrea Giordana, Gilbert Roland, Horst Frank, Ennio Girolami, Ignazio Spall)
- A Long Ride from Hell (1968 by Camillo Bazzoni with Steve Reeves, Wayde Preston, Mimmo Palmara, Rosalba Neri, Nello Razzafini)
- Beyond the Law (1968 by Giorgio Stegani with Lee Van Cleef, Antonio Sabàto, Lionel Stander, Graziella Granata, Gordon Mitchell, Bud Spencer)
- The Vengeance of She (1968 by Cliff Owen with John Richardson, Olinka Berova, Edward Judd, Colin Blakely, Jill Melford)
- Vengeance (1968 by Antonio Margheriti with Richard Harrison, Claudio Camaso, Špela Rozin, Werner Pochath)
- A Minute to Pray, a Second to Die (1968 by Franco Giraldi with Alex Cord, Nicoletta Machiavelli, Arthur Kennedy, Robert Ryan)
- Ballad of a Bounty Hunter (1968 by Joaquín Luis Romero Marchent with Norma Bengell, Simón Andreu, James Philbrook, Luis Induni, Ángel Ortiz)
- Villa Rides (1968 by Buzz Kulik with Yul Brynner, Robert Mitchum, Maria Grazia Buccella, Charles Bronson, Herbert Lom, Robert Viharo)
- I Want Him Dead (1968 by Paolo Bianchini with Craig Hill, Lea Massari, José Manuel Martin, Andrea Bosic, Licia Calderon)
- Su nombre gritaba venganza (1968 by Mario Caiano with Anthony Steffen, William Berger, Evelyn Stewart, Robert Hundar)
- The Moment to Kill (1968 by Giuliano Carnimeo with George Hilton, Walt Barnes, Horst Frank, Loni von Friedl, Rudolf Schündler)
- May God Forgive You... But I Won't (1968 by Vincenzo Musolino with George Ardisson, Dragomir Bojanić, Peter Martell)
- One Dollar Too Many (1968 by Enzo G. Castellari with Antonio Sabàto, John Saxon, Frank Wolff, Leo Anchóriz, Agata Flory)
- Day After Tomorrow (1968 by Nick Nostro with Richard Harrison, Pamela Tudor, José Bódalo, Jolanda Modio, Paolo Gozlino)
- De mis enemigos me ocupo yo (1968 by Mario Amendola with Charles Southwood, Julián Mateos, Alida Chelli, Mirko Ellis, Yvano Staccioli)
- Uno di più all'inferno (1968 by Giovanni Fago with George Hilton, Paolo Gozlino, Claudie Lange, Gérard Herter, Paul Müller)
- Requiem for a Gringo (1968 by José Luis Merino & Eugenio Martín with Lang Jeffries, Fernando Sancho, Femi Benussi, Carlo Gaddi)
- Hasta la última gota de sangre (1968 by Alberto Cardone with Montgomery Ford, Wayde Preston, Dana Ghia, Brett Halsey, Fernando Sancho)
- One by One (1968 by Rafael Romero Marchent with Peter Lee Lawrence, Guglielmo Spoletini, Dyanik Zurakowska, Aurora Bautista, Sydney Chaplin)
- The Mercenary (1968 by Sergio Corbucci with Franco Nero, Tony Musante, Jack Palance, Giovanna Ralli)
- Run, Man, Run (1968 by Sergio Sollima with Tomás Milián, Donald O'Brien, John Ireland, Chelo Alonso, Linda Verras)
- A Sky Full of Stars for a Roof (1968 by Giulio Petroni with Giuliano Gemma, Mario Adorf, Magda Konopka, Julie Ménard)
- The Longest Hunt (1968 by Bruno Corbucci with Brian Kelly, Keenan Wynn, Erika Blanc, Folco Lulli, Fabrizio Moroni)
- Duffy (1968 by Robert Parrish with James Coburn, James Mason, James Fox, Susannah York, John Alderton)
- Shalako (1968 by Edward Dmytryk with Sean Connery, Brigitte Bardot, Stephen Boyd, Honor Blackman, Jack Hawkins, Peter van Eyck)
- A Twist of Sand (1968 by Don Chaffey with Richard Johnson, Honor Blackman, Jeremy Kemp, Peter Vaughan, Roy Dotrice)
- The Cats (1968 by Duccio Tessari with Rita Hayworth, Giuliano Gemma, Klaus Kinski, Margaret Lee, Claudine Auger)
- They Came to Rob Las Vegas (1968 by Antonio Isasi-Isasmendi with Gary Lockwood, Elke Sommer, Lee J. Cobb, Jack Palance)
- I quattro dell'Ave Maria (1968 by Giuseppe Colizzi with Eli Wallach, Terence Hill, Bud Spencer, Brock Peters, Kevin McCarthy)
- Stress Is Three (1968 by Carlos Saura with Geraldine Chaplin, Juan Luis Galiardo, Fernando Cebrian, Porfiria Sanchiz, Chaoro Soriano)
- Commandos (1968 by Armando Crispino with Lee Van Cleef, Jack Kelly, Joachim Fuchsberger, Giampiero Albertini, Marino Masè, Götz George, Marilù Tolo)
- Dead Men Don't Count (1968 by Rafael Romero Marchent with Anthony Steffen, Mark Damon, Dyanik Zurakowska, Luis Induni, Maria Martini, Piero Lulli)
- The Return of Monte Cristo (1968 by André Hunebelle with Paul Barge, Pierre Brasseur, Claude Jade, Paul Le Person)
- Once Upon a Time in the West (1968 by Sergio Leone with Henry Fonda, Claudia Cardinale, Jason Robards, Charles Bronson, Gabriele Ferzetti)
- Kill Them All and Come Back Alone (1968 by Enzo G. Castellari with Chuck Connors, Frank Wolff, Franco Citti, Leo Anchóriz, Hércules Cortés)
- Play Dirty (1969 by André de Toth with Michael Caine, Nigel Davenport, Nigel Green, Harry Andrews)
- A Talent for Loving (1969 by Richard Quine with Richard Widmark, Cesar Romero, Topol, Geneviève Page)
- The Emerald of Artatama (1969 by José María Elorrieta with Nuria Torray, Rory Calhoun, Pilar Arenas, James Philbrook)
- Cemetery Without Crosses (1969 by Robert Hossein with Michèle Mercier, Robert Hossein, Lee Burton, Daniel Vargas, Michel Lemoine)
- La morte sull'alta collina (1969 by Fernando Cerchio & Alfredo Medori with Peter Lee Lawrence, Luis Davila, Tano Cimarosa, Agnès Spaak, Antonio Gradoli)
- Tepepa (1969 by Giulio Petroni with Tomás Milián, Orson Welles, John Steiner, Luciano Casamonica, Ángel Ortiz)
- The Desperados (1969 by Henry Levin with Vince Edwards, Jack Palance, George Maharis, Neville Brand, Sylvia Syms)
- Cantando a la vida (1969 by Angelino Fons with Massiel, Rolf Zacher, José Calvo, Erika Wallner, Gérard Tichy)
- Pago para su muerte (1969 by León Klimovsky with Guglielmo Spoletini, Sydney Chaplin, Wayde Preston, Agnés Spaak, Eduardo Fajardo)
- 100 Rifles (1969 by Tom Gries with Jim Brown, Raquel Welch, Burt Reynolds, Fernando Lamas, Dan O'Herlihy)
- Shoot Twice (1969 by Nando Cicero with Antonio Sabàto, Klaus Kinski, Cristina Galbó, José Calvo, Emma Baron)
- Guns of the Magnificent Seven (1969 by Paul Wendkos with George Kennedy, James Whitmore, Frank Silvera, Reni Santoni, Bernie Casey)
- Les Étrangers (1969 by Jean-Pierre Desagnat with Julián Mateos, Michel Constantin, Senta Berger, Hans Meyer, Alberto Fernández)
- Land Raiders (1969 by Nathan Juran with Telly Savalas, George Maharis, Arlene Dahl, Janet Landgard, Guy Rolfe)
- Susana (1969 by Mariano Ozores with Concha Velasco, Juanjo Menéndez, Ángel Aranda, Paca Gabaldón, Rafaela Aparicio, Florinda Chico)
- The Valley of Gwangi (1969 by Jim O'Connolly with James Franciscus, Gila Golan, Richard Carlson, Laurence Naismith, Freda Jackson)
- Twenty Thousand Dollars for Seven (1969 by Alberto Cardone with Brett Halsey, Teresa Gimpera, Fernando Sancho, Germano Longo, Antonio Casas)
- Sabata (1969 by Frank Kramer with Lee Van Cleef, William Berger, Pedro Sanchez, Nick Jordan, Robert Hundar)
- Sundance and the Kid (1969 by Duccio Tessari with Giuliano Gemma, Nino Benvenuti, Sydne Rome, Antonio Casas, Chris Huerta)
- The Royal Hunt of the Sun (1969 by Irving Lerner with Robert Shaw, Christopher Plummer, Nigel Davenport, Leonard Whiting, Michael Craig)
- The Five Man Army (1969 by Don Taylor & Italo Zingarelli with Peter Graves, Bud Spencer, Nino Castelnuovo, James Daly, Tetsurō Tamba "Un esercito di 5 uomini")
- The Forgotten Pistolero (1969 by Ferdinando Baldi with Leonard Mann, Luciana Paluzzi, Peter Martell, Alberto de Mendoza, Pilar Velázquez)
- A Bullet for Sandoval (1969 by Julio Buchs & Lucio Fulci with George Hilton, Ernest Borgnine, Alberto de Mendoza, Annabella Incontrera, Leo Anchóriz) – in Lucainena de las Torres
- The Price of Power (1969 by Tonino Valerii with Giuliano Gemma, Van Johnson, Fernando Rey, Warren Vanders, Maria Cuadra)
- Boot Hill (1969 by Giuseppe Colizzi with Terence Hill, Bud Spencer, Woody Strode, Victor Buono, Lionel Stander)
- Night of the Serpent (1969 by Giulio Petroni with Luke Askew, Luigi Pistilli, Magda Konopka, Chelo Alonso, Guglielmo Spoletini)
- España plato Internacional (1969 documentary film 11 min by José Lopez Clemente)
- Invernar en España (1969 documentary film 17 min by Luis Torreblanca)
- Viaje a la Andalucía musulmana (1969 documentary film 31 min by Juan Garcia Atienza)

== 1970–1979 ==
- Four Rode Out (1970 by John Peyser with Sue Lyon, Pernell Roberts, Leslie Nielsen, Julián Mateos, Leonard Bell "Cuatro Cabalgaron")
- Patton (1970 by Franklin J. Schaffner with George C. Scott, Karl Malden, Stephen Young, Michael Strong, Frank Latimore)
- Manos torpes (1970 by Rafael Romero Marchent with Peter Lee Lawrence, Alberto de Mendoza, Pilar Velázquez, Aldo Sambrell, Luis Induni)
- El Condor (1970 by John Guillermin with Lee Van Cleef, Jim Brown, Patrick O'Neal, Marianna Hill, Imogen Hassall)
- Sartana Kills Them All (1970 by Rafael Romero Marchent with Gianni Garko, Guglielmo Spoletini, Maria Silva, Raf Baldassarre, Carlos Bravo)
- Arriva Sabata! (1970 by Tulio Demicheli with Anthony Steffen, Peter Lee Lawrence, Eduardo Fajardo, Alfredo Majo, Rossana Rovere)
- More Dollars for the MacGregors (1970 by José Luis Merino with Peter Lee Lawrence, Carlos Quiney, Malisa Longo, María Mahor)
- Adiós, Sabata (1970 by Gianfranco Parolini with Yul Brynner, Dean Reed, Gianni Rizzo, Pedro Sanchez, Joseph Persaud "Indio Black, sai che ti dico: Sei un gran figlio di...")
- Have a Good Funeral, My Friend... Sartana Will Pay (1970 by Giuliano Carnimeo with Gianni Garko, António Vilar, Daniela Giordano, George Wang, Ivano Staccioli)
- Matalo! (1970 by Cesare Canevari with Lou Castel, Luis Dávila, Claudia Gravy, Corrado Pani, Antonio Salines)
- A Man Called Sledge (1970 by Vic Morrow with James Garner, Dennis Weaver, Claude Akins, John Marley, Laura Antonelli "Lo chiavamano Sledge", "Der Einsame aus dem Westen")
- Cannon for Cordoba (1970 by Paul Wendkos with George Peppard, Giovanna Ralli, Raf Vallone, Pete Duel, Don Gordon)
- Figures in a Landscape (1970 by Joseph Losey with Robert Shaw, Malcolm McDowell, Henry Woolf, Christopher Malcolm, Andy Bradford)
- The Deserter (1970 by Burt Kennedy with Bekim Fehmiu, Richard Crenna, John Huston, Chuck Connors, Ian Bannen, Ricardo Montalbán, Brandon deWilde)
- Compañeros (1970 by Sergio Corbucci with Franco Nero, Tomás Milián, Fernando Rey, Jack Palance, Iris Berben)
- El astronauta (1970 by Javier Aguirre with Tony Leblanc, José Luis López Vázquez, Paquito Cano, Puri Villa, José Sazatornil)
- Color de España (1970 documentary film 15 min by Luis Torreblanca with Beulas, Benjamin Palencia, Fernando P. Pieri, Villaseñor)
- Valdez Is Coming (1971 by Edwin Sherin with Burt Lancaster, Susan Clark, Frank Silvera, Jon Cypher, Richard Jordan)
- Whity (1971 by Rainer Werner Fassbinder with Günther Kaufmann, Ron Randell, Hanna Schygulla, Katrin Schaake, Ulli Lommel)
- El Hombre que Vino del Odio (1971 by León Klimovsky with Dennis Saffren, Luciana Paluzzi, Lang Jeffries, José Nieto, Gustavo Rojo)
- A Town Called Bastard (1971 by Robert Parrish with Robert Shaw, Stella Stevens, Martin Landau, Telly Savalas, Fernando Rey) – shot in the Madrid 70 studios in Daganzo
- Los corsarios (1971 by Ferdinando Baldi with Dean Reed, Alberto de Mendoza, Annabella Incontrera, Mary Francis "I pirati dell'isola verde")
- The Last Run (1971 by Richard Fleischer with George C. Scott, Tony Musante, Trish Van Devere, Colleen Dewhurst, Aldo Sambrell)
- The Hunting Party (1971 by Don Medford with Oliver Reed, Gene Hackman, Candice Bergen, Simon Oakland, Ronald Howard)
- The Horsemen (1971 by John Frankenheimer with Omar Sharif, Leigh Taylor-Young, Jack Palance, Alan Webb, David de Keyser)
- Doc (1971 by Frank Perry with Stacy Keach, Faye Dunaway, Harris Yulin, Marshall Efron, Ran Greenburg)
- Captain Apache (1971 by Alexander Singer with Lee Van Cleef, Carroll Baker, Stuart Whitman) – shot in the Madrid 70 studios in Daganzo
- Red Sun (1971 by Terence Young with Alain Delon, Charles Bronson, Ursula Andress, Toshirō Mifune, Capucine "Soleil rouge")
- Catlow (1971 by Sam Wanamaker with Yul Brynner, Richard Crenna, Leonard Nimoy, Daliah Lavi, Jo Ann Pflug)
- El bandido Malpelo (1971 by Giuseppe Maria Scotese with Eduardo Fajardo, George Garvell, Charo López, José Nieto, Sergio Doria "Il lungo giorno della violenza")
- Boulevard du Rhum (1971 by Robert Enrico with Brigitte Bardot, Lino Ventura, Bill Travers, Clive Revill, La Polaca)
- Duck, You Sucker! (1971 by Sergio Leone with James Coburn, Rod Steiger, Romolo Valli, Maria Monti, Rik Battaglia)
- Hannie Caulder (1971 by Burt Kennedy with Raquel Welch, Robert Culp, Ernest Borgnine, Christopher Lee, Jack Elam)
- Blindman (1971 by Ferdinando Baldi with Tony Anthony, Ringo Starr, Lloyd Battista, Magda Konopka, Raf Baldassarre)
- Los gallos de la Madrugada (1971 by José Luis Sáenz de Heredia with Concha Velasco, Fernando Fernán Gómez, Alfredo Mayo, Tony Isbert, José Sazatornil)
- Delusions of Grandeur (1971 by Gérard Oury with Louis de Funès, Yves Montand, Alice Sapritch, Alberto de Mendoza, Leopoldo Trieste, Eduardo Fajardo)
- Un dólar para Sartana (1971 by León Klimovsky with Peter Lee Lawrence, Espartaco Santoni, Aldo Sambrell, Helga Liné, Franco Agostini "Su le mani, cadavere! Sei in arresto")
- Almería (1971 documentary film 13 min by Alberto Carles Bart with Ángel Losada)
- Luz y sol de Andalucía (1971 documentary film 45 min by Jesus Fernandez Santos with El Viti, Lola Flores)
- Vente a ligar al oeste (1972 by Pedro Lazaga with Alfredo Landa, José Sacristán, Antonio Ferrandis, Mirta Miller, Tina Sainz)
- Ben and Charlie (1972 by Michele Lupo with Giuliano Gemma, George Eastman, Marisa Mell, Vittorio Congia, Giacomo Rossi-Stuart "Amico, stammi lontano almeno un palmo...")
- I senza Dio (1972 by Roberto Bianchi Montero with Antonio Sabàto, Chris Avram, Pilar Velázquez, José Jaspe, Paolo Gozlino "Yo los mato, tú cobras la recompensa")
- Antony and Cleopatra (1972 by Charlton Heston with Charlton Heston, Hildegard Neil, Juan Luis Galiardo, Fernando Rey, Carmen Sevilla)
- It Can Be Done Amigo (1972 by Maurizio Lucidi with Bud Spencer, Jack Palance, Renato Cestiè, Dany Saval, Francisco Rabal "Sio puo fare... amigo")
- White Sister (1972 by Alberto Lattuada with Sophia Loren, Adriano Celentano, Fernando Rey, Luis Marín, Juan Luis Galiardo "Blanco, rojo, y...", "Une bonne planque")
- Kill the Poker Player (1972 by Mario Bianchi with Robert Woods, Frank Braña, Susan Scott, Ivano Staccioli, Saturno Cerra "La muerte llega arrastrándose")
- La rebelión de los bucaneros (1972 by José Luis Merino with Charles Quiney, Stan Cooper, Maria Pia Conte, Maria Dolores Tovar, Isarco Ravaioli "I corsari dell'isola degli squali")
- Chato's Land (1972 by Michael Winner with Charles Bronson, Jack Palance, Richard Basehart, Simon Oakland, James Whitmore)
- The Strange Vengeance of Rosalie (1972 by Jack Starrett with Bonnie Bedelia, Ken Howard, Anthony Zerbe)
- God in Heaven... Arizona on Earth (1972 by Juan Bosch with Peter Lee Lawrence, Maria Pia Conte, Frank Braña, Roberto Camardiel, Luis Induni)
- Dr. Phibes Rises Again (1972 by Robert Fuest with Vincent Price, Robert Quarry, Peter Jeffrey, Fiona Lewis, Hugh Griffith)
- Sonny and Jed (1972 by Sergio Corbucci with Tomás Milián, Susan George, Telly Savalas, Rosanna Yanni, Eduardo Fajardo "La banda J. & S. – Cronaca criminale del Far West")
- What the Peeper Saw (1972 by James Kelley & Andrea Bianchi with Mark Lester, Britt Ekland, Hardy Krüger, Lilli Palmer, Harry Andrews)
- Treasure Island (1972 by John Hough with Orson Welles, Kim Burfield, Walter Slezak, Rik Battaglia, Ángel del Pozo)
- Sting of the West (1972 by Enzo G. Castellari with Jack Palance, Lionel Stander, Timothy Brent, Ana Suriani)
- Travels with My Aunt (1972 by George Cukor with Maggie Smith, Alec McCowen, Louis Gossett, Robert Stephens, Cindy Williams)
- What Am I Doing in the Middle of a Revolution? (1972 by Sergio Corbucci with Vittorio Gassman, Paolo Villaggio, Riccardo Garrone, Eduardo Fajardo, José Canalejas "Che c'entriamo noi con la rivoluzione?")
- A Reason to Live, a Reason to Die (1972 by Tonino Valerii with James Coburn, Bud Spencer, Telly Savalas, José Suárez, Georges Géret "Una ragione per vivere e una per morire")
- The Heroes (1973 by Duccio Tessari with Rod Steiger, Rod Taylor, Rosanna Schiaffino, Terry-Thomas, Claude Brasseur "Gli eroi")
- Those Dirty Dogs (1973 by Giuseppe Rosati with Stephen Boyd, Gianni Garko, Simón Andreu, Howard Ross, Teresa Gimpera "Campa carogna... la taglia cresce")
- Dans la poussière du soleil (1973 by Richard Balducci with Bob Cunningham, Maria Schell, Daniel Beretta, Karin Meier, José Calvo "In the Dust of the Sun")
- Charley One-Eye (1973 by Don Chaffey with Richard Roundtree, Roy Thinnes, Nigel Davenport, Jill Pearson, Aldo Sambrell)
- The Man Called Noon (1973 by Peter Collinson with Richard Crenna, Stephen Boyd, Rosanna Schiaffino, Farley Granger, Patty Shepard "Lo chiamvano mezzogiorno")
- Chino (1973 by John Sturges & Duilio Coletti with Charles Bronson, Jill Ireland, Diana Lorys, Marcel Bozzuffi, Vincent Van Patten "Valdez il mezzosange")
- F for Fake (1973 by Orson Welles with Orson Welles, Oja Kodar, Joseph Cotten, François Reichenbach, Richard Wilson "Vérités et mensonges")
- Kara Ben Nemsi Effendi (1973–1975 TV series by Günter Gräwert with Karl Michael Vogler, Heinz Schubert)
- The Final Programme (1973 by Robert Fuest with Jon Finch, Jenny Runacre, Hugh Griffith, Patrick Magee, Sterling Hayden
- La Valise (1973 by Georges Lautner with Mireille Darc, Michel Constantin, Jean-Pierre Marielle, Michel Galabru, Jean Lefebvre)
- Autopsia (1973 by Juan Logar with Juan Luis Galiardo, Jack Taylor, Emiliano Redondo, José Luis Andrés Segura, Hilario Camacho)
- Me has hecho perder el juicio (1973 by Juan de Orduña with Manolo Escobar, Mary Francis, Andrés Pajares, José Sazatornil, Antonio Casal)
- Ci risiamo, vero Provvidenza? (1973 by Alberto De Martino with Tomás Milián, Gregg Palmer, Manuel Gallardo, Carole André, Fedrico Boido)
- My Name Is Nobody (1973 by Tonino Valerii with Henry Fonda, Terence Hill, Jean Martin, Piero Lulli, Mario Brega)
- War Goddess (1973 by Terence Young & Johnny Dwyre with Alena Johnston, Sabine Sun, Rosanna Yanni, Helga Liné, Luciana Paluzzi "Les amazones", "Le guerriere dal seno nudo")
- The Fighting Fist of Shanghai Joe (1973 by Mario Caiano with Chen Lee, Klaus Kinski, Claudio Undari, Katsutoshi Mikuriya, Gordon Mitchell)
- The Spikes Gang (1974 by Richard Fleischer with Lee Marvin, Gary Grimes, Ron Howard, Charles Martin Smith, Arthur Hunnicutt)
- Proceso a Jesús (1974 by José Luis Sáenz de Heredia with Andrés Mejuto, José Maria Rodero, Mónica Randall, Lili Murati, Alfredo Mayo)
- Fantasma en el oeste (1974 by Antonio Margheriti with Alberto Terracina (credited as Tom Scott), Fernando Arrien (credited as Fred Harris), and Maribel Martín "Whiskey e fantasmi")
- And Then There Were None (1974 by Peter Collinson with Oliver Reed, Elke Sommer, Richard Attenborough, Charles Aznavour, Gert Fröbe, Stéphane Audran, Herbert Lom)
- The Four Musketeers (1974 by Richard Lester with Michael York, Oliver Reed, Faye Dunaway, Raquel Welch, Charlton Heston, Christopher Lee, Richard Chamberlain, Frank Finlay)
- The Stranger and the Gunfighter (1975 by Antonio Margheriti with Lee Van Cleef, Lo Lieh, Patty Shepard, Femi Benussi, Karen Yeh)
- The White, the Yellow, and the Black (1975 by Sergio Corbucci with Giuliano Gemma, Tomás Milián, Eli Wallach, Jacques Berthier, Manuel de Blas "Il biancho, il gallo, il nero", "Le blanc, le jaune et le noir")
- The Passenger (1975 by Michelangelo Antonioni with Jack Nicholson, Maria Schneider, Jenny Runacre, Ian Hendry, Steven Berkoff "Professione: reporter")
- Zorro (1975 by Duccio Tessari with Alain Delon, Stanley Baker, Ottavia Piccolo, Enzo Ceruzico, Moustache, Giacomo Rossi-Stuart).
- The Wind and the Lion (1975 by John Milius with Sean Connery, Candice Bergen, John Huston, Brian Keith, Geoffrey Lewis)
- Four of the Apocalypse (1975 by Lucio Fulci with Fabio Testi, Lynne Frederick, Michael J. Pollard, Tomas Milian, Harry Baird, Adolfo Lastretti)
- Cry, Onion! (1975 by Enzo G. Castellari with Franco Nero, Emma Cohen, Martin Balsam, Sterling Hayden, Dick Butkus)
- A Genius, Two Partners and a Dupe (1975 by Damiano Damiani with Terence Hill, Patrick McGoohan, Klaus Kinski, Miou-Miou, Robert Charlebois, Raimund Harmstorf)
- Get Mean (1975 by Ferdinando Baldi with Tony Anthony, Lloyd Battista, Raf Baldassarre, Diana Lorys, Mirta Miller)
- La acción torrencial de nuestros ríos (1975 short film 13 min by José Joaqui Canals with Filiberto Lopez Cadenas, José Joaquin Canals)
- The Story of David (1976 TV film by David Lowell Rich & Alex Segal with Timothy Bottoms, Norman Rodway, Avraham Ben-Yosef, Antonio Taruella, Anthony Quayle)
- Montana Trap (1976 by Peter Schamoni with Hardy Krüger, Stephen Boyd, Arthur Brauss, Diana Körner, Paul Breitner "Potato Fritz")
- La iniciación en el amor (1976 by Javier Aguirre with Fernando Cebrian, Perla Cristal, Maria del Mar, Ágata Lys, José Martin "Dafnis y Cloe")
- Oasis mediterráneo (1976 documentary film 11 min by Juan Manuel de la Chica)
- Curro Jiménez (1976–1979 TV series by Mario Camus, Joaquín Luis Romero Marchent, Francisco Rovira Beleta, Pilar Miró, Antonio Drove with Sancho Gracia, José Sancho, Alvaro de Luna, Francisco Algora, Eduardo García)
- Susana Quiere perder... eso! (1977 by Carlos Aured with Patricia Adriani, Alfredo Alba, José Luis Alexandre, María Casal, Viloeta Cela)
- Sinbad and the Eye of the Tiger (1977 by Sam Wanamaker with Patrick Wayne, Taryn Power, Margaret Whiting, Jane Seymour, Patrick Troughton)
- California (1977 by Michele Lupo with Giuliano Gemma, William Berger, Miguel Bosé, Raimund Harmstorf, Paola Bose "Der Mann aus Virginia", "Adios California")
- March or Die (1977 by Dick Richards with Gene Hackman, Terence Hill, Catherine Deneuve, Max von Sydow, Ian Holm)
- Valentino (1977 by Ken Russell with Rudolf Nureyev, Leslie Caron, Michelle Phillips, Carol Kane, Felicity Kendal)
- The Four Feathers (1978 by Don Sharp with Beau Bridges, Robert Powell, Simon Ward, Jane Seymour, Harry Andrews)
- The Greatest Battle (1978 by Umberto Lenzi with Henry Fonda, John Huston, Helmut Berger, Samantha Eggar, Giuliano Gemma, Stacy Keach "Il grande attacco")
- Silver Saddle (1978 by Lucio Fulci with Giuliano Gemma, Sven Valsecchi, Ettore Manni, Gianni de Luigi, Cinzia Monreale "Sella d'argento")
- China 9, Liberty 37 (1978 by Monte Hellman & Tony Brandt with Warren Oates, Fabio Testi, Jenny Agutter, Sam Peckinpah, Isabel Mestres "Amore, piombo e furore")
- The Thief of Baghdad (1978 by Clive Donner with Roddy McDowall, Kabir Bedi, Terence Stamp, Frank Finlay, Marina Vlady, Peter Ustinov)
- The Nativity (1978 by Bernard L. Kowalski with Madeleine Stowe, John Shea, Jane Wyatt, Paul Stewart, Audrey Totter)
- Jaguar Lives! (1979 by Ernest Pintoff with Joe Lewis, Christopher Lee, Donald Pleasence, Barbara Bach, Capucine, Woody Strode, John Huston)
- The Sky Is Falling (1979 by Silvio Narizzano with Dennis Hopper, Sofía Aldanondo, Carroll Baker, Richard Todd, Faith Brook, David Carpenter)

== 1980–1989 ==
- Les chevaux du soleil (1980 TV series by François Villiers with Maurice Barrier, Denis Manuel, Sylvain Rougerie, Hans Wyprächtiger, Françoise Dufil)
- Deprisa, Deprisa (1981 by Carlos Saura with Berta Socuéllamos, José Antonio Valdelomar, Jesus Arias, José Maria Hervas Roldan, Maria del Mar Serrano)
- Buddy Goes West (1981 by Michele Lupo with Bud Spencer, Souad Amidou, Joe Bugner, Marilda Dona, Sara Franchetti "Occhio alla penna", "Dos granujas en el oeste", "On m'appelle Malabar")
- Comin' at Ya! (1981 by Ferdinando Baldi with Tony Anthony, Victoria Abril, Gene Quintano, Ricardo Palacios, Joaquin Gomez
- Last Harem (1981 by Sergio Garrone with Corinne Cléry, George Lazenby, Daniela Poggi, María Kosti, Ursula Buchfellner "L'ultimo harem")
- Conan the Barbarian (1982 by John Milius with Arnold Schwarzenegger, James Earl Jones, Max von Sydow, Sandahl Bergman, Ben Davidson)
- Cristóbal Colón, de oficio... descubridor (1982 by Mariano Ozores with Andrés Pajares, Fiorella Faltoyano, Maria Kosty, Rafaela Aparicio, Ángel de Andrés)
- Hundra (1983 by Matt Cimber with Laurene Landon, John Gaffari, María Casal, Ramiro Oliveros, Luis Lorenzo)
- Exterminators of the Year 3000 (1983 by Giuliano Carnimeo with Robert Iannucci, Alicia Moro, Luciano Pigozzi, Eduardo Fajardo, Fernando Bilbao "Il giustiziere della strada", "Sterminatori dell'anno 3000", "The Executor – Der Vollstrecker")
- Never Say Never Again (1983 by Irvin Kershner with Sean Connery, Klaus Maria Brandauer, Max von Sydow, Barbara Carrera, Kim Basinger)
- Al este del oeste (1984 by Mariano Ozores with Fernando Esteso, Antonio Ozores, Conrado San Martín, Adriana Vega, Fernando Sancho, Juanito Navarro)
- El caso Almería (1984 by Pedro Costa Musté with Agustín González, Fernando Guillen, Manuel Alexandre, Margarita Calahorra, Iñaky Miramón, Antonio Banderas)
- Tuareg – The Desert Warrior (1984 by Enzo G. Castellari with Mark Harmon, Luis Prendes, Ritza Brown, Paolo Malco, Aldo Sambrell "Tuareg – Il guerriero del deserto")
- The NeverEnding Story (1984 by Wolfgang Petersen with Barret Oliver, Gerald McRaney, Drum Garett, Darryl Cooksey, Nicholas Gilbert)
- Yellow Hair and the Pecos Kid (1984 by Matt Cimber with Laurene Landon, Ken Roberson, Cihangir Ghaffari, Luis Lorenzo, Claudia Gravy "Yellow Hair and the Fortress of Gold")
- Campos of Níjar (1984 documentary film by Nonio Parejo with Juan Diego, Juan Goytisolo, Miguel Rellán, Miguel Ríos)
- A Man Called Rage (1984 by Alfonso Balcázar & Tonino Ricci with Bruno Minniti, Stelio Candelli, Cris Huerta, Werner Pochath, Taida Urruzola "Rage – Fuoco incrociato", "Rush 2 – Final game")
- Rustlers' Rhapsody (1985 by Hugh Wilson with Tom Berenger, Andy Griffith, Patrick Wayne, G. W. Bailey, Marilu Henner, Fernando Rey)
- Tex and the Lord of the Deep (1985 by Duccio Tessari with Giuliano Gemma, William Berger)
- Return to Treasure Island (1986 TV series by Alan Clayton, Alex Kirby & Piers Haggard with Brian Blessed, Christopher Guard, Reiner Schöne, Kenneth Colley, Ray Armstrong)
- White Apache (1986 by Bruno Mattei & Claudio Fragasso with Sebastian Harrison, Lola Forner, Alberto Farnese, Charly Bravo, Cinzia De Ponti "Bianco Apache")
- Sky Bandits (1986 by Zoran Perisic with Scott McGinnis, Ronald Lacey, Ingrid Held, Nicholas Lyndhurst, Nicholas Franau "Gunbus")
- Solarbabies (1986 by Alan Johnson with Richard Jordan, Jami Gertz, Jason Patric, Lukas Haas, James LeGros, Charles Durning)
- La monja alférez (1987 by Javier Aguirre with Esperanza Roy, Karmele Aranburu, Patxi Barko, José Manuel Cervino, Carlos Hipolito)
- Straight to Hell (1987 by Alex Cox with Dick Rude, Sy Richardson, Courtney Love, Joe Strummer, Dennis Hopper, Grace Jones, Elvis Costello, Jim Jarmusch)
- Scalps (1987 by Claudio Fragasso & Bruno Mattei with Vassili Karis, Mapi Galán, Alberto Farnese).
- El techo (1987 short film 10 min by Isabel Hernandez-Sular with Ovidi Montlor, Maria Luisa Borruel, Mercedes Camins, Joan Miralles, Maruchi Rubio)
- Miss Caribe (1988 by Fernando Colomo with Ana Belén, Santiago Ramos, Juan Echanove, Chus Lampreave, Mirtha Echarte)
- The Adventures of Baron Munchausen (1988 by Terry Gilliam with John Neville, Eric Idle, Sarah Polley, Oliver Reed, Charles McKeown, Uma Thurman "Die Abenteuer des Baron Münchhausen")
- Al-Andalus, el camino del sol (1989 by Jaime Oriol & Antonio Tarruella with Eduardo Bea, Charly Bravo, Ralph Brown, José María Caffarel, Guido Castillo)
- Marrakech Express (1989 by Gabriele Salvatores with Diego Abatantuono, Fabrizio Bentivoglio, Cristina Marsillach, Giuseppe Cederna, Gigio Alberti)
- Indiana Jones and the Last Crusade (1989 by Steven Spielberg with Harrison Ford, Sean Connery, Denholm Elliott, Alison Doody, John Rhys-Davies)
- Time to Kill (1989 by Giuliano Montaldo with Nicolas Cage, Ricky Tognazzi, Patrice-Flora Praxo, Giancarlo Giannini "Tempo di uccidere")
- El mejor de los tiempos (1989 by Felipe Vega with Icíar Bollaín, Carmen Bullejos, Jorge de Juan, Rafael Díaz, Rosario Flores)
- Las cosas del querer (1989 by Jaime Chávarri with Ángela Molina, Ángel de Andrés López, Manuel Bandera, Maria Barrorico, Amparo Baró)

== 1990–1999 ==
- Zorro (1990) Pilot episode of an American television series filmed at Texas Hollywood, Tabanas, Almeria starring Duncan Regehr, Patrice Martinez
- Letters from Alou (1990 by Montxo Armendáriz with Mulie Jarju, Eulalia Ramon, Ahmed El-Maaroufi, Akonio Dolo, Albert Vidal)
- Contra el viento (1990 by Francisco Periñán with Antonio Banderas, Emma Suárez, Bruce McGuire, Rosario Flores, Rafael Díaz)
- Navy SEALs (1990 by Lewis Teague with Charlie Sheen, Michael Biehn, Joanne Whalley, Rick Rossovich, Cyril O'Reilly)
- El cielo sube (1991 by Marc Recha with Corinne Alba, Salvador Dolc, Ona Planas)
- Auf Achse (1992 TV series, Season 4, with Manfred Krug, Rüdiger Kirschstein)
- Young Indiana Jones (1992–1993 TV series with Sean Patrick Flanery)
- El hombre que perdió su sombra (1993 by Alain Tanner with Francisco Rabal, Dominic Gould, Ángela Molina, Valeria Bruni Tedeschi, Jean-Gabriel Nordmann "L'homme qui a perdu son ombre")
- The Bird of Happiness (1993 by Pilar Miró with Mercedes Sampietro, Aitana Sánchez-Gijón, José Sacristán, Carlos Hipolito, Lluís Homar)
- Doomsday Gun (1994 by Robert Young with Frank Langella, Kevin Spacey, Alan Arkin, James Fox)
- Morirás en chafarinas (1995 by Pedro Olea with Jorge Sanz, María Barranco, Oscar Ladoire, Javier Albala, Esperenza Campuzano)
- Peor imposible (1995 by Marcello Cesena with Carla Signoris, Maurizio Crozza, Ugo Dighero, Mauro Pirovano, Marcello Cesena)
- Sons of Trinity (1995 by Enzo Barboni)
- Bwana (1996 by Imanol Uribe with Andrés Pajares, María Barranco, Emilio Buale, Alejandro Martínez, Andrea Granero)
- Éxtasis (1996 by Mariano Barroso with Javier Bardem, Frederico Luppi, Sílvia Munt, Daniel Guzmán, Leire Berracal)
- La lengua asesina (1996 by Alberto Sciamma with Melinda Clarke, Jason Durr, Mapi Galan, Mabel Karr)
- Aquí llega Condemor, el pecador de la pradera (1997 by Álvaro Sáenz de Heredia with Gregorio Sanchez, Chiquito de la Calzada, Bigote Arrocet, Sol Abad, José Nieto, Aldo Sambrell)
- Martín (hache) (1997 by Adolfo Aristarain with Federico Luppi, Juan Diego Botto, Eusebio Poncella, Cecilia Roth, Sancho Gracia)
- Spanish Fly (1997 by Daphna Kastner with Daphna Kastner, Toni Cantó, Martin Donovan, Danny Huston, Antonio Pastor)
- Some Kind of Bliss (Music video for Kylie Minogue's 1997 single)
- Winnetous Rückkehr (1998 TV film by Marijan David Vajda with Pierre Brice)
- Denk ich an Deutschland – Augenblick (1998 documentary film by Doris Dörrie & Werner Penzel)
- Don Juan (1998 by Jacques Weber with Jacques Weber, Emmanuelle Béart, Penélope Cruz, Ariadna Gil, Michel Boujenah)
- La Vuelta de El Coyote (1998 by Mario Camus with José Coronado, Nigel Davenport, Ramon Langa, Ray Lovelock, Isabel Seranno "The Return of El Coyote")
- El árbol del penitente (1999 by José Maria Borrell with Ravier Manrique, Elena Anaya, Idelfonso Tamayo, Bruto Pomeroy, Yousaf Bakhari)
- Dollar for the Dead (1998 Gene Quintano with Emilio Estevez, William Forsythe, Joaquín de Almeida, Jordi Mollà, Jonathan Banks, Howie Long)
- Outlaw Justice (1999 by Bill Corcoran with Kris Kristofferson, Waylon Jennings, Willie Nelson, Travis Tritt, Chad Willett "The Long Kill")

== 2000–2009 ==
- Queen of Swords, (2000) a 22-episode television series filmed at FortBravo/Texas Hollywood with Tessie Santiago, Paulina Galvez, Anthony Lemke, Elsa Pataky, Valentine Pelka, Peter Wingfield. A Canadian/Spanish/UK television production.
- Los Almendros-plaza nueva (2000 short film 25 min by Alvaro Alonso Gomez with Andrés, Perro de Trinidad, Francisco "El niño de la Manola", Antonio "El Pescaito", Maria Fernandez Moreno)
- Año mariano (2000 by Karra Elejalde & Fernando Guillén Cuervo with Karra Elejarde, Fernando Guillén Cuervo, Manuel Manquiña, Gloria Munoz, Silvia Bel)
- Cerca del Danubio (2000 documentary film 25 min by Felipe Vega)
- Sexy Beast (2000 by Jonathan Glazer with Ben Kingsley, Ian McShane, Ray Winstone, Amanda Redman)
- Die Manns – Ein Jahrhundertroman (2001 série télé by Heinrich Breloer with Armin Mueller-Stahl, Monica Bleibtreu, Jürgen Hentsch, Veronica Ferres, Sebastian Koch)
- Honolulu Baby (2001 by Maurizio Nichetti with Maria de Medeiros, Maurizio Nichetti, Jean Rochefort, Paulina Galvez, Marián Aguilera)
- In Love with the Desert (2001 documentary film by Alain Littaye with Eddie Fowlie)
- Movern Callar (2001 by Lynne Ramsay with Samantha Morton, Kathleen McDermott, Linda McGuire, Ruby Milton, Dolly Wells)
- Sergio Leone Cinema, Cinema (2001 by Carles Prat & Manel Mayol with Carlos Aguilar, Alessandro Alessandrini, Dario Argento, Damiano Damiani, Tonino Delli Colli)
- Der Schuh des Manitu (2001 by Michael Herbig with Michael Herbig, Christian Tramitz, Sky du Mont, Marie Bäumer, Hilmi Sözer)
- 800 Bullets (2002 by Álex de la Iglesia with Sancho Gracia, Ángel de Andrés, Carmen Maura, Eisebio Cancela, Luis Castro)
- La balsa de Piedra (2002 by George Sluizer with Federico Luppi, Icíar Bollaín, Gabino Diego, Ana Pradao, Diogo Infante)
- Bestiario (2002 by Vicente Pérez Herrero with Carmen Elias, Itziar Miranda, Carlos Bardem, Miguel Molina, Juan Carlos Vellido)
- Come Together (2002 by Graham Theakston with Paul Ansdell, Ali Bastian, Clare Bullus, Alexandra J. Cameron, James d'Arcy)
- Demasiado amor (2002 by Ernesto Rimoch with Juan Alonso, Martin Altomaro, Alma Rosa Anorve, Carmen Beato, Juan Manuel Bernal)
- Talk to Her (2002 by Pedro Almodóvar with Rosario Flores, Javier Cámara, Darío Grandinetti, Leonor Wattling, Mariola Fuentes)
- Mucha sangre (2002 by Pepe de las Heras with Paul Naschy, Rodolfo Sancho, Txema Sandoval, Isabel del Toro, Júlio Campos)
- Poniente (2002 by Chus Gutiérrez with José Coronado, Cuca Escribano, Mariola Fuentes, Antonio Dechent, Antonio de la Torre)
- Sarah (2002 short film 13 min by Maider Oleaga)
- Desayunar, comer, cenar, dormir (2003 short film 23 min by Lino Escalera with Neus Asensi, Ana Risueño, Jorge Bosch)
- Grimm (2003 by Alex van Warmerdam with Teresa Bergenza, Johan Leysen, Alina Reijn, Jacob Derwig, Frank Lammers)
- Imagining Argentina (2003 by Christopher Hampton with Antonio Banderas, Emma Thompson, Irene Escolar, Fernando Tielve, Leticia Dolera)
- La leyenda del Sheriff McCorgan (2003 short film 8 min by Freddie Cheronne with Chano Rodriguez, Juan Herrada, Manu Onraita)
- The Tulse Luper Suitcases, Part 1: The Moab Story (2003 by Peter Greenaway with JJ Feild, Raymond Barry, Valentina Cervi)
- Jericho Mansions (2003 by Alberto Sciamma with James Caan, Geneviève Bujold, Jennifer Tilly, Maribel Verdú, Peter Keleghan)
- The Gospel of John (2003 by Philip Saville with Christopher Plummer, Henry Ian Cusick, Stuart Bunce, Daniel Kash, Stephen Russell)
- Traumschiff Surprise – Periode 1 (2004 by Michael Herbig with Michael Herbig, Til Schweiger, Christian Tramitz, Rick Kavanian, Anja Kling)
- Abgefahren – Mit Vollgas in die Liebe (2004 by Jakob Schäuffelen with Felicitas Woll, Sebastian Ströbel, Nina Tenge, Rebecca Masselmann, Teresa Weißbach)
- Blueberry (2004 by Jan Kounen with Vincent Cassel, Michael Madsen, Juliette Lewis, Ernest Borgnine, Tchéky Karyo, Temuera Morrison "Blueberry, l'expérience secrète")
- Brothers (2004 by Susanne Bier with Connie Nielsen, Ulrich Thomsen, Nikolaj Lie Kaas, Sarah Juel Werner, Rebecca Logstrup)
- Les Dalton (2004 by Philippe Haïm with Éric Judor, Ramzy Bedia, Marthe Villalonga, Sylvie Joly, Élie Semoun, Jean Dujardin, Darry Cowl, Saïd Serrari, Romain Berger, Til Schweiger "Les Dalton")
- Un día sin fin (2004 by Giulio Manfredonia with Antonio Albanese, Goya Toledo, Fabio de Luigi, Asunción Balaguer, Jacobo Dicenta)
- Exils (2004 by Tony Gatlif with Romain Duris, Lubna Azabal, Zouhir Gacem, Leila Makhlouf, Habib Cheik)
- Hipnos (2004 by David Carreras with Cristina Brondo, Demián Bichir, Marisol Membrillo, Julian Villagran, Féodor Atkine)
- Las huellas que devuelve el mar (2004 by Gabi Beneroso with Cayetana Guillén Cuervo, Antonio Dechent, Alex O'Dogherty, Marián Aguilera, Javier Páez)
- La Llamada (2004 short film 12 min by David del Aguila with Germán Cobos, Jesús Herrera)
- La luz de la primera estrella (2004 short film 8 min by Inaki Martikorena with Marta Aledo, Raúl Arévalo, Kévin McCourt, Guillermo Rittwagen)
- The Reckoning (2004 by Paul McGuigan with Willem Dafoe, Tom Hardy, Paul Bettany, Marián Aguilera, Trevor Steedman, Simon McBurney)
- Cowboy de Mediodía (2005 short film 11 min by Alberto Blanco with Carlos Lucas)
- El Derechazo (2005 short film 14 min by Julien Lacombe & Pascal Sid with Barbara Cabrita, Sonia Embarek, Youssef Hajdi, Christophe Dimitri Réveille, Wadeck Stanczak)
- Energy Hunter (2005 short film 7 min by Albert Arriza with Hub Martin, Ismael Fritschi)
- Malas temporadas (2005 by Manuel Martín Cuenca with Javier Cámara, Leonor Whatling, Eman Xor Ona, Nathalie Poza, Yolanda Serrano, Gonzalo Pedrosa)
- Manolito Espinberg, une vie de cinéma (2005 short film 12 min by Miguel C. Rodriguez & Luis Francisco Pérez with Jaime J. Crespillo, Silvia Abascal, Fabrice Ferra, Álex Angulo, Juan Diego Botto)
- Sommerhundesöhne (2005 by Cyril Tuschi with Fabian Busch, Stipe Erceg, Lilja Loeffler, Martin Claussen, Daniela Ziegler)
- A Sound of Thunder (2005 by Peter Hyams with Edward Burns, Catherine McCormack, Ben Kingsley, Jemima Rooper, David Oyelowo)
- Dark Horse (2005 by Dagur Kári with Jacob Cedergren, Nicolas Bro, Tilly Scott Pedersen, Morten Suurballe, Bodil Jørgensen "Dark horse")
- Zwarte Zwanen (2005 by Colette Bothof with Carice van Houten, Adewale Akwande, Miguel Ángel, Dragón Bakema, Yolanda Carmone)
- Comme des voleurs (2006 by Lionel Baier with Natacha Koutchoumov, Lionel Baier, Alicja Bachleda-Curuś, Stéphane Rentznik, Anne-Lise Tobagi "Comme des voleurs(A l'est)")
- Desconocidos (2006 short film 12 min by David del Aguila with Elisa Matilla, Jesús Herrera, Alvaro Monje, Zoraida Monje)
- Peacemaker (2006 by Álex Pastor with José Luis Adserias, Enrik Arquimbau, Jordi Gracia, Iván Morales, Francisco Moreno)
- Tirant lo Blanc (2006 by Vicente Aranda with Casper Zafer, Esther Nubiola, Leonor Watling, Ingrid Rubio, Jane Asher, Giancarlo Giannini, Victoria Abril)
- "Publicité Football Romain pour Pepsi" (2006? with David Beckham) Publicité Pepsi
- Andalucía (2007 by Alain Gomis with Samir Guesmi, Delphine Zingg, Djolof Mbengue, Bass Dhem, Axel Bogousslavsky)
- Colorado Avenue (2007 by Claes Olsson with Birthe Wingren, Nicke Lignell, Peter Kanerva, Ylva Ekblad, Irina Björklund)
- Dennis P. (2007 by Pieter Kujipers with Edo Brunner, Nadja Hüpscher, Willeke van Ammelrooy, John Leddy, Sjoerd Pleijsier)
- El ejido La loi du profit (2007 documentary film 80 min by Jawad Rhalib)
- Espagueti western (2007 animation short film 12 min by Sami Natsheh with Paco León)
- Limoncello (2007 by Luis Berdejo & Borje Cobeaga with Eva Almaya, Álex Angulo, Germán Cobos, Miriam Giovanelli, Mauro Muniz)
- Lugar del poeta (2007 documentary film 55 min by David del Aguila)
- Más allá de tus ojos (2007 short film 3 min by José Manuel Lopez & Miguel Aizpurua with Alicia Galera)
- Operación Flecha Rota (2007 documentary film 96 min by José Herrera Plaza "Broken arrow Nuclear accident in Palomares (Almería))
- Outlaw Dreaming (2007 short film 7 min by Rafael Lopez Ruiz with Gerardo Polomares Martínez "Sonando fuera de la ley")
- The Tonto Woman (2007 by Daniel Barber with Charlotte Asprey, Richard Brake, Sam Douglas, Lola Garcia, John Golightly)
- Asterix at the Olympic Games (2008 by Frédéric Forestier, Thomas Langmann with Gérard Depardieu, Clovis Cornillac, Benoît Poelvoorde, Vanessa Hessler, Alain Delon, Stéphane Rousseau, Franck Dubosc, José Garcia, Jean-Pierre Cassel, Adriana Karembeu, Sim, Michael Schumacher, Jean Todt, Zinedine Zidane, Tony Parker "Astérix aux jeux olympiques")
- Camino (2007 by Javier Fesser with Nerea Camacho, Carme Elías, Mariano Venancio, Manuela Vellés, Ana Gracia)
- Dead Bones (2008 short film of 18 min by Olivier Beguin with Arie Verveen, Frederic Landenberg, Ken Foree)
- La Possibilité d'une île (2008 by Michel Houellebecq with Benoît Magimel, Ramata Koite, Patrick Bauchau, Andrzej Seweryn, Jean--Pierre Malo)
- Road Spain (2008 by Jordi Vidal with Marc Rodriguez, Ingrid Rubio, Carlos Álvarez-Nóvoa, Saturnino Ribera, Maria Ribera)
- Ruedas (2008 short film 11 min by Alberto Gómez Uriol with Victor Valdivia, Alba Ferrara, Juan Gómez Uriol, Sergio Gómez-Casero)
- Summer Heat (Zomerhitte) (2008 by Monique van de Ven with Waldemar Torenstra and Jelka van Houten)
- The Girl with the Dragon Tattoo (2009 film by Niels Arden Oplev with Michael Nyqvist, Noomi Rapace "Män som hatar kvinnor")
- The Limits of Control (2009 film by Jim Jarmusch with Isaach de Bankolé)

== 2010–2019 ==
- Doctor Who (2012 TV episode "A Town Called Mercy" with Matt Smith, Karen Gillan, Arthur Darvill
- Living Is Easy with Eyes Closed (2013 by David Trueba with Javier Cámara, Natalia de Molina and Francesc Colomer)
- Bad Men (Music video for Miel de Botton 2014 single)
- Exodus: Gods and Kings (2014 by Ridley Scott with Christian Bale, Aaron Paul, Sigourney Weaver)
- El Niño (2014 by Daniel Monzón with Luis Tosar)
- Game of Thrones (2016 season 6). The desert of Tabernas became the land of the Dothraki, a gigantic steppe in Essos; Pechina depicted Vaes Dothrak, their commercial capital; Torre de Mesa Roldán in Cabo de Gata natural park became part of Meereen, the city of pyramids; the Alcazaba fortress was the capital of Dorne, the kingdom of the House Martell; and Sorbas.
- Red Dead Redemption: Seth's Gold (2015 short film based on the videogame)
- Risen (2016 by Kevin Reynolds with Joseph Fiennes and Tom Felton)
- Shout Out to My Ex (Music video for Little Mix 2016 single)
- Brimstone (2016 by Martin Koolhoven with Kit Harington)
- Oxygen Music video for Spada 2017 by Claudio Zagarini
- My Name Is Thomas (2018 by Terence Hill).
- Terminator: Dark Fate
- Money Heist (La Casa de Papel) (2019, season 3)
- Black Mirror (2017, episode 6 of season 4)
- The Sisters Brothers (2018)
- Dust Devil (The MUTE Series) (2019)

== 2020–2029 ==
- White Lines (series) (2020 by Álex Pina with Laura Haddock, Nuno Lopes, Marta Milans
- Jesús de Nazaret (2020 by Rafa Lara with Julián Gil, Mayrín Villanueva, Gaby Espino, Lincoln Palomeque, Marlene Favela
- Wonder Woman 1984 (2020 by Patty Jenkins with Gal Gadot, Chris Pine, Pedro Pascal, Kristen Wiig)
- That Dirty Black Bag (series) (2022 with Douglas Booth, Dominic Cooper, Niv Sultan
- Journey to Bethlehem (2023 by Adam Sanders with Fiona Palomo, Milo Manheim, Antonio Banderas)
