= The Deserter (1970 film) =

1970 film

The Deserter; The Devil's Backbone (USA); Ride to Glory (USA, video title)
- Theatrical poster
- Directed by: Burt Kennedy
- Screenplay by: Clair Huffaker
- Story by: Stuart J. Byrne; William H. James
- Produced by: Dino De Laurentiis; Norman Baer; Ralph Serpe
- Starring: Bekim Fehmiu; Richard Crenna; Chuck Connors; Ricardo Montalbán; Ian Bannen; Brandon deWilde; Slim Pickens; Woody Strode; Albert Salmi; Patrick Wayne; John Huston
- Cinematography: Aldo Tonti
- Edited by: Frank Santillo
- Music by: Piero Piccioni
- Production company: Dino de Laurentiis Cinematografica
- Distributed by: Paramount
- Release date: December 4, 1970
- Running time: 100 minutes
- Countries: Italy; United States; Yugoslavia
- Language: English

The Deserter (Italian: La Spina Dorsale Del Diavolo), also known as The S.O.B.s and The Devil's Backbone is a 1970 Italian-Yugoslav American international co-production Western film produced by Dino De Laurentiis. It was directed by Burt Kennedy and written by Clair Huffaker.

Scripted during the Vietnam War in the style of The Dirty Dozen (1967) with a party of professional or misfit soldiers going into an enemy sanctuary, it was designed as a vehicle for Yugoslavian theater and film matinee idol Bekim Fehmiu. The film featured an ensemble cast of well-known American actors. Best known for his role as the boy Joey Starrett in Shane (1953), actor Brandon deWilde appears in his last Western film before his death in 1972.

== Plot ==
A United States Army cavalry unit returns from a two-week patrol to find the inhabitants of a Christian mission near its home fort have been killed by Apache Indians. The savagely tortured wife of the patrol's leader, Captain Victor Kaleb, is still alive after being skinned alive. Kaleb has to kill her to end her pain.

Kaleb believes part of the fault lies with the passive fort commander, Major Wade Brown, and loudly criticizes him in front of his command. Brown responds by asking whether it was the Apaches or him who shot his wife. Kaleb responds by shooting Major Brown in the leg and arm, then deserts. He wages a private one-man war of revenge against the Apache.

Two years later, General Miles arrives at the fort with criticism of now Colonel Brown's military command and an offer of pardon for Kaleb. Scouts Natchai and Tattinger, old friends of Kaleb, are sent out to entice him (and his pet wolf-dog) back to the fort. With a bit of trickery they succeed.

Miles tells Kaleb that Apaches led by Chief Mangus Durango have gathered in Mexico, intending to cross the border and attack at any time. As the Army is prohibited from entering Mexico, Miles, over Brown's objections, promises Kaleb amnesty in exchange for leading a select band of soldiers in plain clothes across the border to wipe out the Apache stronghold known as La Spina Dorsale Del Diavolo (the Devil's Backbone).

Kaleb has his pick of the soldiers at the fort for his mission. Those willing to go include dynamite expert and Army chaplain Reynolds, knife-fighting expert and military prisoner Corporal Jackson, Gatling gun expert Captain Robinson, grizzled Quartermaster Sergeant Schmidt and young Lieutenant Ferguson. A blustery Englishman, Crawford, sent by the British Army to study frontier tactics is selected by Kaleb's wolf dog. Kaleb also selects the post's surgeon Scott. Most of the men hate Kaleb, especially Trooper O'Toole.

Kaleb trains them in the desert for the mission. It is severe, and results in O'Toole's death. The band also encounters Apaches, whom they kill. On their return to the fort, Brown reveals that, despite Miles' amnesty offer, he intends to arrest Kaleb for having shot him. In response, Miles orders Brown to accompany Kaleb on the mission. Natchai and Tattinger go along as well.

The group infiltrate the Apache stronghold by bringing their mounts and equipment up hazardous cliffs. After a successful smaller attack on part of the Apaches, due to Natchai's sense of morality, the rest of the Apaches are alerted, leading to a fierce battle. Kaleb's elite force wins, in large part due to the advantages proffered by dynamite and machine gun fire. The survivors return to the fort, where an embarrassed Miles explains that he has been ordered to arrest Kaleb. Brown suggests the resolution: they will all say Kaleb was killed in action. Kaleb rides away.

== Cast ==
- Bekim Fehmiu as Captain Victor Kaleb
- John Huston as General Miles
- Richard Crenna as Major Wade Brown
- Chuck Connors as Chaplain Reynolds
- Ricardo Montalbán as Natchai
- Ian Bannen as Captain Crawford
- Brandon deWilde as Lieutenant Ferguson
- Slim Pickens as Tattinger
- Woody Strode as Jackson
- Albert Salmi as Schmidt
- Patrick Wayne as Captain Bill Robinson
- Fausto Tozzi as Orozco
- Mimmo Palmara as Chief Mangus Durango
- John Alderson as O'Toole
- Doc Greaves as Scott

== Production ==
Bekim Fehmiu who had starred as Ulysses in Dino De Laurentiis' 1968 television miniseries L'Odissea had recently starred in Paramount's The Adventurers (1970).

The film was shot largely on location in Italy, Spain and Yugoslavia in September and October 1969. Many exterior scenes were filmed at the Fort Bowie set built in the Province of Almería, Spain, where the desert landscape and climate that characterizes part of the province have made it a much used setting for Western films, among those A Fistful of Dollars (1964), The Good, the Bad and the Ugly (1966) and later 800 Bullets (2002). This same set was also used in the films Blindman (1971) with Ringo Starr and A Reason to Live, a Reason to Die (1972).

In his diay in October 1969 Kennedy wrote "This is the worst crew I've ever worked with. The cameraman is trying to win an Academy Award. The picture is rotten so far."

== Reception ==
In his investigation of narrative structures in Spaghetti Western films, Bert Fridlund writes that The Deserter mainly follows the "Professional Plot", as described by Will Wright in his analysis of American Westerns, that is the cooperation of a group of professionals fulfilling a mission.

== Home media ==
=== Video ===
The Deserter was originally released on VHS in the United States by Paramount Home Entertainment, on September 9, 1992. Paramount has not released the film as a DVD in North American Region 1. It was available at one time in DVD Region 0 by East West Entertainment LLC in standard non-widescreen VHS conversion and Region 4 by Reel Corporation, Australia.

=== Soundtrack ===
The score for The Deserter had music composed and conducted by Piero Piccioni. Originally a practicing lawyer securing movie rights for Italian film distributors, he was eventually credited with scoring over 300 films. Piccioni was influenced in his use of jazz by 20th century classical composers and American cinematography and this is apparent in The Deserter soundtrack.

Piccioni's score was released on CD in Italy in 1997 on the Legend label, as CD 28, 14-tracks under the title Piero Piccioni: La Spina Dorsale Del Diavolo. Recent discovery of the stereo master tapes of the original session, with an extra 25 minutes of music, is featured on the limited 1500 unit special edition Legend CD 32 DLX, released July, 2010, as a 26-track 74:34 CD.

== See also ==
- List of American films of 1971
- List of films shot in Almería
- List of Spaghetti Western films
