= A Reason to Live, a Reason to Die =

1972 Italian spaghetti Western film

A Reason to Live, a Reason to Die!
- Directed by: Tonino Valerii
- Screenplay by: Ernesto Gastaldi; Tonino Valerii; Rafael Azeona
- Story by: Ernesto Gastaldi; Tonino Valerii
- Produced by: Alfonso Sansone; Henryk Chrosicki; Jose Frade
- Starring: James Coburn; Bud Spencer; Telly Savalas; Reinhard Kolldehoff
- Cinematography: Alejandro Ulloa
- Edited by: Franco Fraticelli
- Music by: Riz Ortolani
- Production companies: Sancrosiap; Terza Film; Atlantida Films; Corona
- Distributed by: Cidif (Italy)
- Release dates: 27 October 1972 (Italy); 27 December 1972 (West Germany); 6 August 1973 (Spain); 29 May 1974 (France)
- Running time: 112 minutes
- Countries: Italy; Spain; France; West Germany
- Languages: English; Italian
- Box office: ₤1.96 billion

A Reason to Live, a Reason to Die (originally titled Una Ragione Per Vivere E Una Per Morire, also known as Massacre at Fort Holman) is a 1972 Technicolor Italian spaghetti Western movie starring James Coburn, Bud Spencer, and Telly Savalas.

Many exterior scenes were filmed at the Fort Bowie set built in the Province of Almería, Spain, where the desert landscape and climate that characterizes part of the province have made it a much utilized setting for Western films, among those A Fistful of Dollars, The Good, the Bad and the Ugly, Once Upon a Time in the West, and later 800 Bullets. The Fort Bowie set was originally built for the film The Deserter.

There are two different English language versions of the movie, shorter with James Coburn's own voice and longer with different voice actors and music. James Coburn was not involved in longer cut dubbing. It also features some of the same songs from Day of Anger starring Lee Van Cleef.

== Plot ==
The plot line is derivative of The Dirty Dozen, but set during the American Civil War. In 1862, disgraced former US colonel Pembroke (James Coburn) wants to recapture Fort Holman, which he had previously surrendered to the Confederate army years earlier without a shot having been fired. He has a scheme that might enable him to accomplish it with a small force.

Pembroke arranges for the liberty of a number of men who are about to be executed. Eli (Bud Spencer) was a looter. The other "volunteers" are a deserter who killed two sentries, a soldier who murdered his commanding officer and raped his wife, a horse thief, two other looters (one of whom stole medicine, which caused soldiers to die), and an Indian "bastard" who had killed a white man who sold alcohol to Apaches. The man presented as "the worst of the bunch" – a religious pacifist agitator – declines the offer of freedom and is hanged.

Pembroke holds the motley group together by saying he is really after a treasure of gold that is hidden inside the fort. Eli uses a stolen uniform to gain entrance. He soon realizes that there is no gold, and later learns that the present commander of the fort, Major Ward (Telly Savalas), had blackmailed Pembroke into giving up the fort by threatening his son's life. Ward then had the son killed anyway. Eli produces a paper that shows he is an officer sent to check the fort's security. It works, but Ward plans to execute the "security officer". Before he can do so, Eli triggers a massive explosion that lets the others in, and they attack the garrison. After an explosive battle, only Pembroke, Eli, and Ward are left standing. Pembroke kills Ward with his own sword and the two survivors leave together.

== Cast ==
- James Coburn as Col. Pembroke
- Bud Spencer as Eli Sampson (one of Pembroke's unit to take Fort Holman)
- Telly Savalas as Major Ward
- Fabrizio Moresco as Ward's Assistant
- Reinhard Kolldehoff as Sergeant Brent (one of Pembroke's unit to take Fort Holman)
- José Suarez as Major Charles Ballard
- Georges Géret as Sergeant Spike
- Ugo Fangareggi as Ted Wendel (one of Pembroke's unit to take Fort Holman)
- Guy Mairesse as Donald MacIvers (one of Pembroke's unit to take Fort Holman)
- Benito Stefanelli as Piggott
- Adolfo Lastretti as Will Fernandez (one of Pembroke's unit to take Fort Holman)
- Joe Pollini as Jeremy (Indian) (one of Pembroke's unit to take Fort Holman)
- Ángel Álvarez as Scully the Monger
- Francisco Sanz as Farmer
- Sharin Sher as April
- David Landau

== Release ==
A Reason to Live, A Reason to Die was released on 27 October 1972 in Italy where it was distributed by Cidif. The film had a domestic gross of 1,960,071,000 Italian lire. The film was later released on 27 December 1972 in West Germany, 6 August 1973 in Spain, and 29 May 1974 in France. It received a release in the United States 1974 August 28.

== Reception ==
In his investigation of narrative structures in Spaghetti Western films, Fridlund discusses A Reason to Live, a Reason to Die mostly in terms of the "infiltrator" plot introduced in A Fistful of Dollars, where the Man With No Name joins a gang with hidden agendas of his own. Eli is an infiltrator entering the fort and piling one false motive on top of the other to cover his true intentions. In fact, the same goes for Pembroke - pitting his rather involuntary companions against the Confederates with a false monetary motive beside the official, to re-conquer Ft Holman for the Union, while his real hidden motive is vengeance.

== Home media ==
Wild East has released the full uncut version with around 30 minutes extra footage on an out-of-print limited edition R0 NTSC DVD in the film's original widescreen aspect ratio with the title A Reason to Live, a Reason to Die.

== See also ==
- List of films shot in Almería
