= Iannucci =

Iannucci is an Italian surname. Notable people with the surname include:

- Antonio Iannucci (1914–2008), Italian prelate of the Roman Catholic Church
- Armando Iannucci (born 1963), Scottish comedian, writer, director, performer, and radio producer
- Athan Iannucci (born 1982), professional lacrosse player
- Robert Iannucci (born 1955), American computer scientist
