= Nigel Smith (literature scholar) =

English literature professor

Nigel Smith is a literature professor and scholar of the early modern world. He is William and Annie S. Paton Foundation Professor of Ancient and Modern Literature and Professor of English at Princeton University, where he has taught since 1999. He is best known for his interdisciplinary work, bridging literature and history, on 17th-century political and religious radicalism and the literature of the English Revolution, including the poetry and prose of John Milton and Andrew Marvell.

Smith was born in London and read English and History at the University of Hull. As a Commonwealth Scholar, he completed an MA in English at McGill University (1980–81). He received his D.Phil. in English at Oxford University (1981–85).

== Career ==
He was Junior Research Fellow at Merton College, Oxford, 1984–86; Fellow and Tutor in English at Keble College, Oxford, 1986–99, and successively Lecturer (1991–96) and Reader (1996–99) in the English Faculty at the University of Oxford, chairing the English Faculty Board, 1997–99. He joined the Princeton English Department in 1999 and currently chairs the University’s Committee for Renaissance and Early Modern Studies.

He is the author of several field-changing studies, considered seminal and standard works in their field: Perfection Proclaimed: Language and Literature in English Radical Religion 1640–1660 (Oxford UP, 1989); Literature and Revolution in England, 1640–1660 (Yale UP, 1994); the Longman Annotated English Poets edition of Andrew Marvell's Poems (2003, rev. pbk 2007; a TLS 'Book of the Year' for 2003); Andrew Marvell: The Chameleon (Yale UP, 2010; a TLS 'Book of the Year' for 2010; Choice Outstanding Academic Title for 2010).

He has also edited the Ranter pamphlets (1983; revised edn. 2014), the Journal of George Fox (Penguin, 1998), and co-edited with Nicholas McDowell the Oxford Handbook of Milton (Oxford UP, 2009; Irene Samuel Prize, 2010).

He is currently completing Polyglot Poetics: Transnational Early Modern Literature, which expands his interest from Britain to continental Europe and some colonial contexts in the Americas and Africa.

He wrote and performed songs with Paul Muldoon in Rackett (2004–10) and Wayside Shrines (2010–15). He is currently setting some of John Donne's lyrics to music with the opera composer Andrew S. Lovett.

Notable doctoral students of Smith's include Sarah Ross, professor at Victoria University of Wellington.

== Awards ==
Smith was a Newberry Library/NEH Fellow (1997), a Guggenheim Fellow (2007–08), a National Humanities Center Fellow (2007–8), a Member of the Institute for Advanced Study (2012–13), a Royal Netherlands Academy of Arts and Sciences Visiting Professor at the Huygens Institute, Amsterdam, 2017, and a Folger Library/NEH Fellow (2017–18). He is the recipient of an honorary doctorate (Hon. D. Litt.) from the University of Hull (2014).

== Publications ==
- A Collection of Ranter Writings from the Seventeenth Century (Junction Books, 1983). 278 pp. Ed. with introduction. Substantially revised as A Collection of Ranter Writings: Spiritual Liberty and Sexual Freedom in the English Revolution (Pluto Books, 2014). ISBN 9780745333601.
- Perfection Proclaimed: Language and Literature in English Radical Religion, 1640–1660 (Oxford UP, 1989).
- Literature and Revolution in England 1640-1660 (Yale UP, 1994; pbk. 1997). ISBN 9780300071535.
- George Fox, The Journal (Penguin Books, 1998). 536 pp. Ed. with introduction. ISBN 1405832835.
- A Radical's Books: The Library Catalogue of Samuel Jeake of Rye, ed. with introduction, in collaboration with Michael Hunter, Giles Mandelbrote and Richard Ovenden (Boydell and Brewer, 1999). ISBN 9780859914710.
- British Literary Radicalism, 1650–1830, ed. with Timothy Morton (Cambridge UP, 2002). ISBN 9780521120876
- The Poems of Andrew Marvell, ed., with introduction and notes, Longman Annotated English Poets Series (2003, rev pbk 2007).
- Is Milton better than Shakespeare? (Harvard UP, 2008). ISBN 0674028325
- Oxford Handbook of Milton (Oxford UP, 2009), ed. with Nicholas McDowell. ISBN 9780199697885.
- Andrew Marvell: The Chameleon (Yale University Press, 2010; pbk 2012). ISBN 9780300181968.
- Mysticism and Reform, 1400–1750, ed. with Sara S. Poor (Notre Dame UP, 2015 in 'ReFormations: Medieval and Early Modern' series). ISBN 978-0-268-03898-4.
- Radical voices, Radical ways: Articulating and Disseminating Radicalism in Seventeenth- and Eighteenth-century Britain, ed. with Laurent Curelly (Manchester UP, 2016). ISBN 978-1-5261-3432-5.
- Politics and Aesthetics in European Baroque and Classicist Tragedy, ed. with Jan Bloemendal (E. J. Brill, 2016).
