= Anna Orso =

Italian actress (1938–2012)

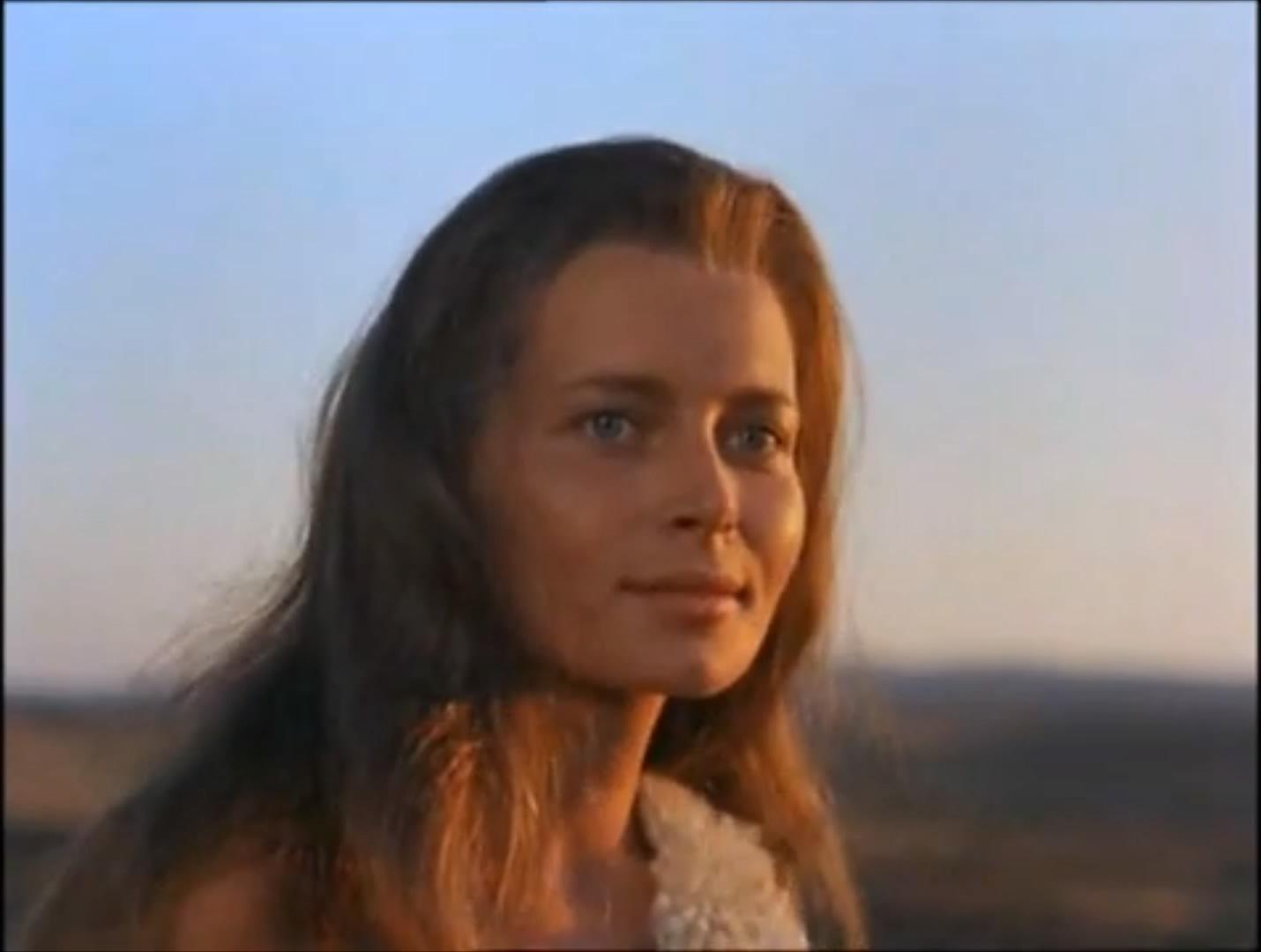
- Orso as Eve in I patriarchi (1964)
- Born: 11 December 1938; Naples, Kingdom of Italy
- Died: 14 August 2012 (aged 73); Rome, Italy
- Occupation: Actress

Anna Maria Orso (December 11, 1938 – August 14, 2012) was an Italian film actress whose career in international and Italian cinema spanned more than fifty years.

== Career ==
Orso made her film debut in The Bible: In the Beginning..., a 1966 religious epic film directed by American film director John Huston. Over the course of her career, Orso appeared in numerous American and Italian films directed by Alberto Bevilacqua, Marco Bellocchio, Jose Dajane, Riccardo Donna, Diego Febbraro, Luciano Odorisio, Pasquale Squitieri, Massimo Troisi, and Wim Wenders.

Orso appeared in the 2003 HBO television series, Angels in America, opposite Al Pacino and Meryl Streep. She was also cast in the 2004 film, The Life Aquatic with Steve Zissou, directed by Wes Anderson. At the time of her death in 2012, Orso was filming The Girl from Nagasaki, a film adaptation of Madame Butterfly, directed by Michel Comte.

Anna Orso died in a Rome hospital of an illness on August 14, 2012, at the age of 74. She was survived by her son, Umberto. Her remains were cremated, and a memorial service was scheduled for the library of cinema in Trastevere in September 2012.

== Partial filmography ==
- Storie sulla sabbia (1963)
- I patriarchi (1964) - Eve
- The Bible: In the Beginning... (1966) - Shem's Wife
- Gentleman Killer (1967) - Ruth Morrison
- Day of Anger (1967) - Eileen Cutcher
- Quarta parete (1968)
- Agguato sul Bosforo (1969) - Roberta (uncredited)
- Lettera aperta a un giornale della sera (1969)
- Io e Dio (1970)
- Questa specie d'amore (1972)
- I Kiss the Hand (1973) - Signora Ardizzone
- The Inheritor (1973) - Giovanella Cordell
- 24 ore... non un minuto di più (1974)
- Young Lucrezia (1974)
- La profanazione (1974) - Giovanna Cattanei - aka Vannozza
- Cagliostro (1975) - The Queen
- A Second Spring (1975) - Marcella
- Ride bene... chi ride ultimo (1977) - Wife of Entrepreneur (segment "Arriva lo Sceicco")
- Il ladrone (1980) - Maria Magdalena
- Salto nel vuoto (1980) - Marilena
- L'ultima volta insieme (1981) - Vittoria
- Exterminators of the Year 3000 (1983) - Linda
- Il pentito (1985)
- Il mostro di Firenze (1986) - Mother of a victim
- Devil in the Flesh (1986) - Mrs. Dozza
- La vita di scorta (1986)
- Le vie del Signore sono finite (1987)
- Al calar della sera (1992)
- Adelaide (1992)
- Blu notte (1992)
- Cominciò tutto per caso (1993) - Madre di Stefania
- Io e il re (1995)
- Un giorno, un giorno, una notte... (1997) - La donna da anziana
- Ponte Milvio (2000) - Emilia
- Incontri di primavera (2000)
- The Life Aquatic with Steve Zissou (2004) - Party Guest #2
- Manuale d'amore (2005) - Margherita's mother
- L'anno mille (2008) - Guaritrice
- Palermo Shooting (2008) - Mother
- Four Single Fathers (2009) - Dom's Mother
- My Way (2012) - La vieille Italienne
- Breve storia di lunghi tradimenti (2012) - Signora con i capelli bianchi
- The Girl from Nagasaki (2013)
- Darkside Witches (2015) - Witch (final film role)
