= Permission to Kill =

1975 film by Cyril Frankel

- Original film poster by Robert Tanenbaum
- Directed by: Cyril Frankel
- Screenplay by: Robin Estridge
- Based on: W.I.L. One to Curtis; 1967 novel by Philip Loraine
- Produced by: Paul Mills
- Starring: Dirk Bogarde; Ava Gardner; Bekim Fehmiu
- Cinematography: Freddie Young
- Edited by: Ernest Walter
- Music by: Richard Rodney Bennett
- Production company: Sascha Film
- Distributed by: AVCO Embassy Pictures (Warner Bros in the United Kingdom through Columbia-Warner Distributors)
- Release date: 20 November 1975 (UK)
- Running time: 93 minutes
- Countries: Austria; United Kingdom; United States
- Language: English
- Budget: $1.2 million

Permission to Kill (also known as The Executioner and Vollmacht Zum Mord) is a 1975 Austrian/American/British spy thriller film directed by Cyril Frankel and starring Dirk Bogarde, Ava Gardner and Bekim Fehmiu with Timothy Dalton, Nicole Calfan and Frederic Forrest. It was produced by Paul Mills from a screenplay by Robin Estridge, made by Sascha-Verleih and distributed by AVCO Embassy Pictures in the USA and in the UK and internationally by Warner Bros. The film had original music by Richard Rodney Bennett and the cinematography was by Freddie Young.

== Plot ==
Alexander Diakim, leader of the socialist "National Freedom Party", wants to return to his fascist controlled country in order to organise resistance to the government. An organisation calling itself "Western Intelligence Liaison" (WIL), has orders to stop him and the operation is led by agent Alan Curtis. Curtis has identified five individuals who would be useful to the operation, and has 'persuaded' them to travel to the town of Gmunden, Austria using a mixture of bribery, blackmail and subterfuge. The five are unaware of each other's presence and have been defined by WIL as 'expendable'.

One of the five is Scott Allison an American journalist who had been a close friend of Diakim when a student. He visits Diakim at his temporary headquarters and they meet despite the reservations of Diakim's aide-de-camp Kostas, but Allison's attempt to persuade him to postpone his return is unsuccessful. The next visitor is Katina Petersen, another of the five, Diakim's ex lover and mother of the son he had previously been unaware of. Curtis has leaked this information, and Petersen is forced to tell the full story, including the fact that the boy had been adopted soon after birth and is also one of the five present in Gmunden. She warns Diakim not to meet or trust Curtis.

But Curtis has tempted Diakim to join a cruise on the Traunsee, so that he can see his son, if only at a distance. He talks to Diakim directly, urging him to put off his return until a time when Western governments can fully support him, and holding out the possibility of a happy domestic life (with Petersen and their son) as an alternative, but Diakim is not impressed. Meanwhile, Allison has confirmed the identity of the two remaining people in Gmunden, the British civil servant Charles Lord and the French assassin Melissa Lascade. Lord had previously worked in securing a government loan for Diakim's party, while Lascade's function is apparently to kill Diakim if all other strategies fail - 'final insurance' as WIL terms it.

Now his attempts at persuasion have failed, Curtis asks Lord to visit Diakim, tell him that his loan has been written off, and offer him 500,000 dollars in cash - on condition he cancels his plan to return. Allison now makes contact with Lord and Lascade, and they decide to work together to frustrate Curtis' plans. Lord will steal the money, pay it to Lascade, who will then deliberately fail in her attempt to kill Daikim. However, the plan fails after Curtis realises the deception, Lord is shot while trying to escape, and Curtis forces Lascade to return the money.

Diakim makes the decision to proceed with his plans and travels to Vienna airport, so Curtis is forced to move to his last resort, the assassination. At the airport Allison and Katina reveal Curtis' plan, and Diakim is protected by his entourage so that Lascade cannot get a clean shot at him. However, as Diakim goes to board his plane, Curtis detonates a bomb concealed in his briefcase, killing him instantly. Curtis' henchmen then kill Lascade, planting the detonator on her body so that she will be blamed for Diakim's murder. As Curtis leaves the building, his mission accomplished, he is shot by Kostas.

== Partial cast ==
- Dirk Bogarde as Alan Curtis
- Ava Gardner as Katina Petersen
- Bekim Fehmiu as Alexander Diakim
- Timothy Dalton as Charles Lord
- Nicole Calfan as Melissa Lascade
- Frederic Forrest as Scott Allison
- John Levene as Adams
- Klaus Wildbolz as Muller
- Anthony Dutton as Jennings
- Peggy Sinclair as Lily
- Dennis Blanch as Brewer
- Alf Joint as MacNeil
- Vladimir Popovic as Kostas
- Ratislav Plamenac as Pavlos
- Oliver Schott as François
- Erna Riedl as Mme Diderot
- Paul Maxwell as American
- John Serret as Frenchman
- Anthony Forwood as Englishman
- François Baudet as Dr. Giraud
- Bob Sessions as Pete
- Peter Garell as Carlo
- Friedrich Mönnig as Cliff
- Fritz von Friedl as 1st security man
- Erwin Fischer as 2nd security man

== Production ==
The film was shot at the Sievering Studios in Vienna and on location in Gmunden, Austria.

== Critical reception ==
The Monthly Film Bulletin wrote: "A suspense thriller entirely devoid of tension since Robin Estridge, from whose novel it is adapted, has failed to provide his protagonist Diakim with an authentic political identity. Lacking the vaguest idea who Diakim is or what he stands for, audiences can hardly be expected to feel strongly about his life or his death. The plot's overall lack of definition is not improved by the tritely ominous secrecy surrounding the character of Curtis, an agent of implausible efficiency and ruthlessness who would have been more at home in a fantasy thriller than in this pretentious political mishmash. ... The film reaches its melodramatic nadir when Lord, his bloody chest uncovered, is laid prominently on a table in the bustling HQ of Western Intelligence Liaison, studiously ignored by the hard-hearted Curtis while a secretary dabs ineffectively at the wound with a minuscule piece of cottonwool. Bogarde, at his best for some time recently in roles requiring understated menace, here shields behind his poker-face and occasionally twitching upper lip. The tousled but still good-looking Ava Gardner, in the thin supporting role of Katina, emotes heavily in a style of acting more suited to the star vehicles of an earlier age."
