= Cagliostro (1975 film) =

1975 film

- Directed by: Daniele Pettinari
- Written by: Pier Carpi; Daniele Pettinari; Enrica Bonaccorti
- Starring: Bekim Fehmiu; Curd Jürgens; Evelyn Stewart; Anna Orso; Adolfo Lastretti; Luigi Pistilli; Rosanna Schiaffino; Robert Alda; Massimo Girotti
- Cinematography: Giuseppe Pinori
- Edited by: Adriano Tagliavia
- Music by: Manuel De Sica
- Release date: 1975
- Language: Italian

Cagliostro is a 1975 Italian biographical drama film directed by Daniele Pettinari. Loosely based on the real life events of Alessandro Cagliostro, the film has many historical inaccuracies, including the claim that Giuseppe Balsamo and Cagliostro were two different persons.

== Cast ==
- Bekim Fehmiu as Cagliostro / Giuseppe Balsamo
- Curd Jürgens as Cardinal Giovanni Angelo Braschi, future Pope Pius VI
- Rosanna Schiaffino as Lorenza Balsamo
- Evelyn Stewart as Serafina Cagliostro
- Massimo Girotti as Giacomo Casanova
- Robert Alda as Pope Clement XIII
- Luigi Pistilli as Cardinal Louis-René-Édouard de Rohan-Guéménée
- Anna Orso as the Queen
- Adolfo Lastretti as the Camerlengo
- Alessandro Haber as the beggar
- Franco Ressel as Morandi
- Antonio Pierfederici as the naturalist monk
- Luigi Montini as Prelate
- Ada Pometti as French noblewoman
- Corrado Annicelli
