= Dans la poussière du soleil =

- Directed by: Richard Balducci
- Screenplay by: Richard Balducci (uncredited); Félix Fernández (uncredited)
- Story by: William Shakespeare (play Hamlet)
- Starring: Maria Schell; Daniel Beretta; Robert Cunningham; Karin Meier; Colin Drake
- Cinematography: Tadasu G. Suzuki
- Edited by: Liliane Fattori
- Music by: Francis Lai
- Production companies: Univers Galaxie; Kerfrance Production
- Distributed by: Univers Galaxie (France, 1972, theatrical); Golden Era Film Distributors (United Kingdom, 1976, theatrical); VideoRama (Sweden, 1982, video)
- Release date: 1972
- Running time: 90 minutes
- Country: Italy; France
- Language: French

Dans la poussière du soleil (lit. 'In the Dust of the Sun', Italian: Il sole nella polvere, lit. 'The Sun in the Dust'), released in English as Dust in the Sun and Lust in the Sun, is a 1972 Italian-French Spaghetti Western directed by Richard Balducci.

The plot is loosely adapted from William Shakespeare's tragedy Hamlet.

== Plot ==
In the dusty small town of San Angelo, on the border between Mexico and Texas, rancher Joe Bradford tortures his brother to death and forces his wife, Gertie, to marry him. Gertie's son, Hawk, a seemingly simple and slightly autistic boy, looks to set things right. As Hawk learns that Joe only wanted his brother's ranch, all the local girls are chasing after him, especially Maria, the sheriff's daughter, to the sheriff's outrage. Maria's brother, a gunfighter, also joins the fray opposing the now-loving couple, whose families clash in a final, merciless battle.

== Cast ==
- Maria Schell as Gertie Bradford
- Daniel Beretta as Hawk Bradford
- Robert Cunningham as Joe Bradford
- Karin Meier as Maria Edwards
- José Calvo as the Great Goldoni
- Colin Drake as Sheriff Edwards
- Perla Cristal as Saloon Owner
- Manuel Otero as Ken
- Lorenzo Robledo as Swann
- Pilar Vela as Madame Goldoni
- Ángel del Pozo as Priest
- Fernando Bilbao as Flops

== Production ==
The film was shot in Almería, after receiving approval from the Spanish censors.

== Release ==
The film was released in English as Dust in the Sun and Lust in the Sun.
