= Tonino Valerii =

Italian film director (1934–2016)

- Born: 20 May 1934; Teramo, Abruzzo, Italy
- Died: 13 October 2016 (aged 82); Rome, Lazio, Italy
- Occupation: Film director

Tonino Valerii (20 May 1934 – 13 October 2016) was an Italian film director, most known for his Spaghetti Westerns. Tonino (Antonio) Valerii started his film career as an assistant director on Sergio Leone's A Fistful of Dollars, before moving on to direct by himself. Among his best-known films are Day of Anger (1967) The Price of Power (1969), My Dear Killer (1972), A Reason to Live, a Reason to Die (1972) and My Name Is Nobody (1973), starring Henry Fonda and Terence Hill.

In 1970, he directed A Girl Called Jules, which was entered into the 20th Berlin International Film Festival.

He died on 13 October 2016 in a clinic in Rome at the age of 82.

== Filmography ==
Title	Year	Credited as				Notes	Ref(s)
Title	Year	Director	Screenwriter	Screen story writer	Other	Notes	Ref(s)
I Love, You Love	1961				Yes	Assistant to Alessandro Blasetti. Uncredited.	
The Best of Enemies	1961				Yes	Assistant to Blasetti. Uncredited.	
I motorizzati	1962				Yes	Second assistant director	
Tutto è musica	1963		Yes	Yes	Yes	Assistant director	
I terribili 7	1964				Yes	Assistant director	
Terror in the Crypt	1964		Yes		Yes	Assistant director	
A Fistful of Dollars	1964				Yes	Dialogue director	
The Long Hair of Death	1964		Yes				
For a Few Dollars More	1965				Yes	Assistant director	
Per il gusto di uccidere	1966	Yes	Yes	Yes			
Day of Anger	1967	Yes	Yes				
The Price of Power	1969	Yes	Yes	Yes			
A Girl Called Jules	1970	Yes	Yes				
My Dear Killer	1972	Yes	Yes				
A Reason to Live, a Reason to Die	1972	Yes	Yes	Yes			
My Name is Nobody	1973	Yes					
Go Gorilla Go	1975	Yes					
Sahara Cross	1977	Yes	Yes				
Unscrupulous	1986	Yes	Yes				
Shatterer	1987	Yes	Yes	Yes			
Brothers in Blood	1987	Yes					
