= Adolfo Lastretti =

Italian actor (1937–2018)

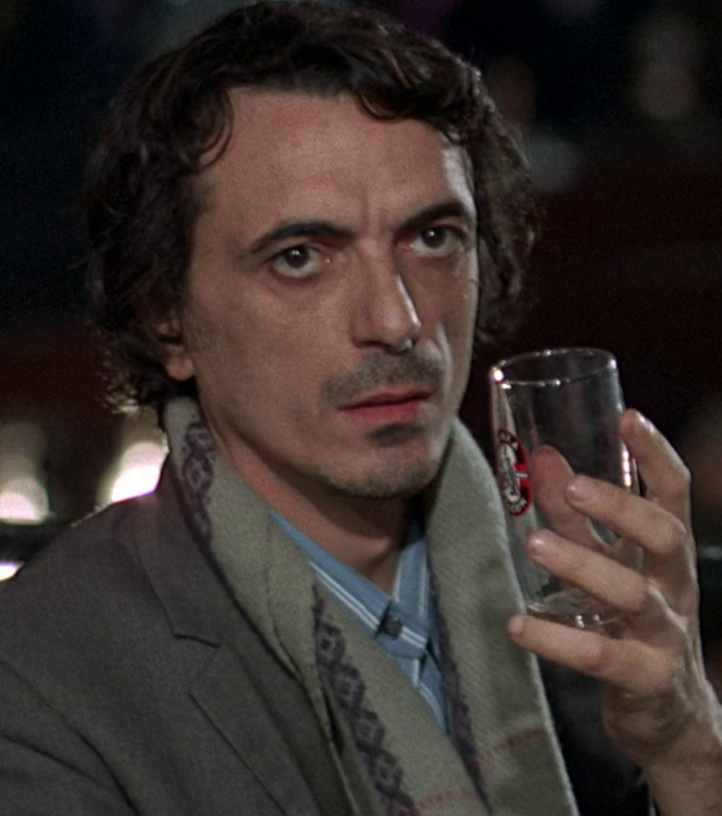
- Lastretti in Confessions of a Police Captain (1971)
- Born: 18 November 1937; Tempio Pausania, Italy
- Died: 5 May 2018 (aged 80); Loiano, Italy

Adolfo Lastretti (18 November 1937 – 5 May 2018) was an Italian film, television and stage actor.

== Life and career ==
Born in Tempio Pausania, Lastretti grew up in Rapallo, where his family had relocated due to his father's work. After appearing in the short film La spiaggia, he moved to Rome to pursue a film career. He soon specialized in character roles, often cast as a villain. Also active as a voice actor, he was the Italian voice of KITT in Knight Rider. After being part of the main cast of the soap opera Vivere, he retired in 2003 following the closure of the series and moved to Albinia, where he spent his last years.

Lastretti died in Loiano on 5 May 2018, at the age of 80.

== Selected filmography ==
- Find a Place to Die (1968)
- Venus in Furs (1969)
- Corbari (1970)
- Confessions of a Police Captain (1971)
- Deaf Smith & Johnny Ears (1972)
- A Reason to Live, a Reason to Die (1972)
- Mean Frank and Crazy Tony (1973)
- Shaft in Africa (1973)
- Scipio the African (1974)
- Borsalino & Co. (1974)
- Spasmo (1974)
- Flic Story (1975)
- Four of the Apocalypse (1975)
- Syndicate Sadists (1975)
- The Gypsy (1975)
- Cagliostro (1975)
- Povero Cristo (1975)
- Dog's Heart (1976)
- Weapons of Death (1977)
- A Man Called Magnum (1977)
- Lion of the Desert (1981)
- Il disertore (1983)
- Dolce far niente (1998)
- Padre Pio: Miracle Man (2000)
