= Sarah Ross =

Renaissance scholar in New Zealand

- Born: 1974 (age 51–52)

Academic background
- Education: University of Oxford
- Thesis: Women and religious verse in English manuscript culture c1600–1688 : Lady Anne Southwell, Lady Hester Pulter and Katherine Austen (2000)
- Doctoral advisor: Nigel Scott Smith

Academic work
- Institutions: Victoria University of Wellington

Sarah Catherine Elizabeth Ross (born 1974) is a New Zealand academic, and is a full professor in the School of English, Film, Theatre, Media and Communication, and Art History at Victoria University of Wellington. Ross is a scholar of Renaissance literature, particularly women's complaint poetry.

== Academic career ==
Ross completed a Bachelor of Arts with Honours at the University of Canterbury, before earning an MSt and completing a DPhil titled Women and religious verse in English manuscript culture c1600–1688: Lady Anne Southwell, Lady Hester Pulter and Katherine Austen at the University of Oxford, under the supervision of Nigel Smith. Ross then joined the faculty of Massey University, moving to Victoria University of Wellington in 2013 and rising to full professor in 2023.

Ross was awarded a Marsden Fast-Start Grant in 2006, and was the principal investigator on a full grant in 2016 for work on the engagement of Renaissance women in the "powerful and ubiquitous" rhetorical model of complaint. As part of this project, and with further funding from the Australian Research Council, she and collaborators Rosalind Smith (Australian National University) and Michelle O'Callaghan (University of Reading) produced an online index to early modern women's complaint poetry. This allowed the researchers to investigate the types of complaints women wrote, for example whether they were amatory, religious, or "complaints against the times", alongside the form of the complaint, for instance, lyric poem, song or sonnet.

== Awards and honours ==
Ross was awarded a University Research Excellence Award in 2019. The Society for the Study of Early Modern Women and Gender awarded Ross the Best Teaching Edition for her 2017 edited book Women Poets of the English Civil War.

== Selected works ==
- Clarke, Danielle; Ross, Sarah C. E.; Elizabeth Scott-Baumann, eds. (2022). The Oxford Handbook of Early Modern Women's Writing in English, 1540-1700. Oxford handbooks. Oxford University Press. doi:10.1093/oxfordhb/9780198860631.001.0001. ISBN 978-0-19-886063-1. Wikidata Q123439980.
- Ross, Sarah C. E.; Smith, Rosalind, eds. (2020), Early Modern Women's Complaint: Gender, Form, and Politics, Early Modern Literature in History, Palgrave Macmillan, Wikidata Q123439984
- Ross, Sarah C. E.; Elizabeth Scott-Baumann, eds. (2017). Women poets of the English Civil War. Manchester University Press. ISBN 978-1-5261-2870-6. OL 30592475M. Wikidata Q123440017.
- Ross, Sarah C. E. (2023). "Lucy Hutchinson (1620–1681)". History from Loss. pp. 94–99. doi:10.4324/9781003127499-13. ISBN 978-1-003-12749-9. Wikidata Q123439976.
- Burke, Victoria; Ross, Sarah C. E. (2001). "Elizabeth Middleton, John Bourchier, and the Compilation of Seventeenth-Century Religious Manuscripts". The Library. 2 (2): 131–160. doi:10.1093/library/2.2.131. Wikidata Q58627471.
- Ross, Sarah C. E. (2021). "A Small Room with Large Windows". Criticism. 63 (1–2): 169. doi:10.13110/criticism.63.1-2.0169. Wikidata Q123439977.
