= Bekim Fehmiu =

Yugoslav Albanian actor (1936–2010)

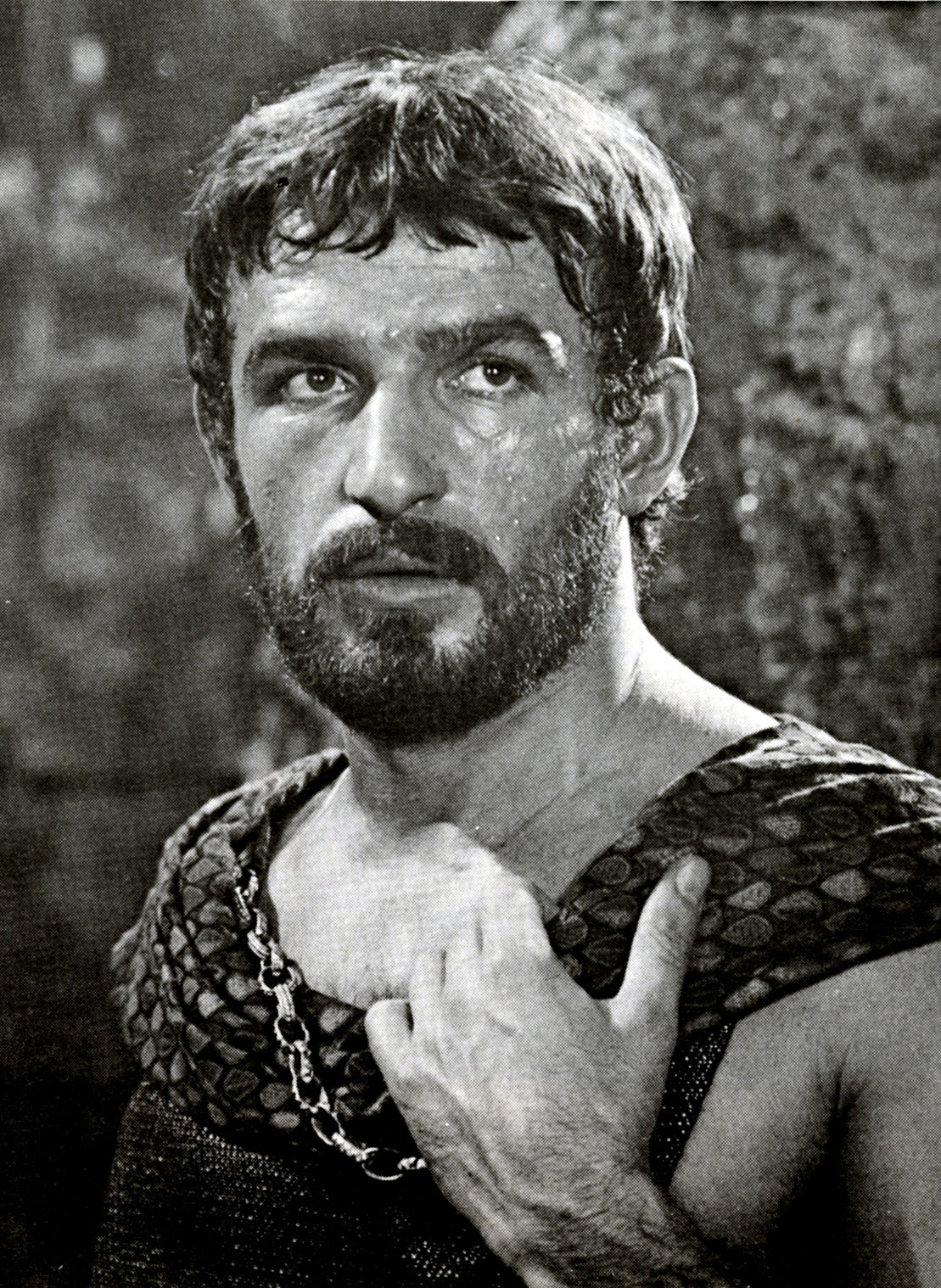
- Fehmiu as Ulysses in 1968 Italian TV miniseries L'Odissea.
- Born: 1 June 1936; Sarajevo, Kingdom of Yugoslavia (now Bosnia and Herzegovina)
- Died: 15 June 2010 (aged 74); Belgrade, Serbia
- Occupation: Actor
- Years active: 1953–1998

Bekim Fehmiu (Albanian: [bɛˈkim fɛhˈmiu]; Serbo-Croatian: Беким Фехмију; 1 June 1936 – 15 June 2010) was a Yugoslav Albanian theater and film actor. He was the first Eastern European actor to star in Hollywood during the Cold War, and one of the internationally best-known ethnic Albanian actors.

== Biography ==
=== Early life ===
Fehmiu was born in Sarajevo, into an ethnic Albanian family originating from Gjakova, Kosovo. His father Ibrahim adopted his high-school nickname Fehmiu as a surname replacing the original Imer Halili. The family moved to Shkodër, Albania, where they spent three years, and in 1941 returned to Prizren where Bekim spent his childhood. He was part of the acting club at his high school in Prizren, and after graduation he became a member of County Popular Theatre in Pristina, the only professional Albanian language theatre in Yugoslavia. He graduated from the Faculty of Dramatic Arts (FDU) in Belgrade in 1960.

=== Acting career ===
In 1960, Fehmiu became a member of the Yugoslav Drama Theatre in Belgrade, which he left in 1967, citing bad treatment, to become a free artist.

Fehmiu's big break was the 1967 film I Even Met Happy Gypsies, a subtle portrayal of Roma life which won two awards in Cannes and was nominated for an Oscar. Known for his macho appearance and mild manner, Fehmiu was then wooed by Western filmmakers and signed a contract with the Academy Award-winning producer Dino De Laurentiis. It was De Laurentiis who, in 1968, cast him as Odysseus in the acclaimed mini-series of The Odyssey. It was the first blockbuster of Italian television and made Fehmiu well-known in parts of Europe.

Fehmiu seemed poised for stardom in Hollywood as well, but his first American film, The Adventurers, was a critical failure. In 1971, Fehmiu starred in the western action drama The Deserter, directed by Burt Kennedy. In 1973 he played the role of the busy father in Raimondo Del Balzo's heartbreaking film The Last Snows of Spring, and then in 1975 played the role of ex-politician Alexander Diakim in the movie Permission to Kill, with Ava Gardner and Dirk Bogarde.

In 1976, Fehmiu starred as fictional murdered Luftwaffe pilot, Hans Reiter in Tinto Brass's film, Salon Kitty alongside Helmut Berger, Ingrid Thulin and Teresa Ann Savoy. He portrayed a Palestinian terrorist in John Frankenheimer's 1977 political thriller, Black Sunday. Despite his Hollywood films achieving little success, he did well in European art house cinema as well as in the theatre, the latter being his preferred medium. He portrayed the father of Mother Teresa, Nikola Boyaxhiu, in the 1982 film La Voce (The Voice). He acted as Joseph in the Italian production A Child Called Jesus (1987). He was to have acted in the movie Genghis Khan (1992) that was ultimately never completed.

In 1987, in protest at the Yugoslavian government's treatment of Kosovar Albanians, he walked off the stage at the Yugoslav Drama Theatre in Belgrade during the play Madame Kollontai by Agneta Pleijel. He left the stage, and soon after, film. His last on-screen role was in the 1998 Italian movie Il cuore e la spada.

=== Personal life ===
Fehmiu was married to Serbian actress Branka Petrić. The couple had two sons, Hedon and Uliks, and resided in the Zvezdara area of Belgrade. Uliks Fehmiu is also an actor.

=== Death ===
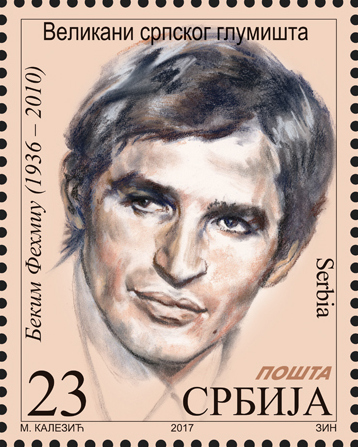
Fehmiu on a 2017 Serbian stamp

Fehmiu was found dead on 15 June 2010 in his apartment in Belgrade. Initial reports stated he committed suicide. Interior Minister Ivica Dačić said Fehmiu was found shot in his apartment and the gun was registered in Fehmiu's name. He was 74 years old. His body was cremated and the ashes were scattered in Prizren Bistrica in Prizren, his childhood home.

== Legacy ==
The New York Times dubbed Fehmiu the "Yugoslav heart-throb" for his youthful conquests and acquaintances with the likes of Brigitte Bardot and Ava Gardner. Decades after his last appearance on the screen, readers of a leading Italian women's magazine voted him one of the ten most attractive men of the 20th century.

Fehmiu appeared in 41 films between 1953 and 1998. He was one of the first Albanian theater and film actors to act in theaters and movies all over Yugoslavia, with Abdurrahman Shala, Faruk Begolli and Enver Petrovci, appearing in a series of roles that changed the history of the Cinema of Yugoslavia and left a mark in the artistic developments elsewhere. By the end of his career he had acted in film productions in nine languages, including Balkan languages, French, Spanish, English and Italian.

In 2001, Samizdat B92 published a book of Bekim Fehmiu's memoirs, entitled Blistavo i strašno (Brilliant and Terrifying), which describes his life until 1955, the year he became an actor.

== Filmography ==
=== Film ===
Year	Title	Role	Notes
1957	Subotom uvece	1960	Dan cetrnaesti
1961	Tu ne tueras point	Čuvar u čekaonici	Uncredited
1962	Saša	Marić, poručnik Kraljevske vojske	
1964	Pod isto nebo	Kerim	
1965	Devojka		
1965	Klakson	Marko	
1965	Neprijatelj		
1965	Ko puca otvoriće mu se		
1966	Morgan: A Suitable Case for Treatment		Uncredited
1966	Roj	Halil Beg	
1966	Vreme ljubavi	Milija, trubač	(segment "Put")
1966	Tople godine	Mirko	
1967	I Even Met Happy Gypsies	Bora	
1967	Protest	Ivo Bajsić	
1968	Uzrok smrti ne pominjati	Mihajlo	
1970	The Adventurers	Dax Xenos	
1970	The Deserter	Capt. Victor Kaleb	
1971	Klopka za generala	Doktor – obaveštajac OZNE	
1973	The Last Snows of Spring	Roberto	
1974	Il gioco della verità		
1974	Deps	Deps	
1974	Il testimone deve tacere	Il dottor Giorgio Sironi	
1974	Košava	Adam Milovanović	
1975	Cagliostro	Count Alexander Cagliostro / Giuseppe Balsamo]	
1975	Libera, amore mio...	Sandro Poggi	
1975	Pavle Pavlović	Pavle Pavlović	
1975	Permission to Kill	Alexander Diakim	
1976	Salon Kitty	Hans Reiter	
1977	Disposta a tutto	Marco	
1977	Black Sunday	Mohammed Fasil	
1977	Special Education	Vaspitač Žarko Munižaba	
1978	Stići pre svitanja	Esad Ljumi	
1979	Partizanska eskadrila	Major Dragan	
1981	Široko je lišće	Baja	
1982	Sarâb	Vlsdar	
1982	La Voce	Nicolay	
1982	Pavilón seliem	Kalmán Furtek	
1985	Crveni i crni	Ivan Pipan	
1992	Genghis Khan		unfinished film

=== Television ===
Year	Title	Role	Notes
1968	L'Odissea	Ulisse	International TV mini-series
1968	Prljave ruke		TV film
1972	Paljenje Rajhstaga	[Georgi Dimitrov]	TV short
1979	I vecchi e i giovani	Aurelio Costa	TV mini-series
1987	Un bambino di nome Gesù	Joseph	TV mini-series
1987	Poslednja priča		TV film
1989	Disperatamente Giulia	Armando Zani #2	TV mini-series
1998	Il cuore e la spada	Gormond	TV film
