= The Adventurers (1970 film) =

1970 film directed by Lewis Gilbert

- Theatrical release poster
- Directed by: Lewis Gilbert
- Screenplay by: Michael Hastings; Lewis Gilbert
- Based on: The Adventurers by Harold Robbins
- Produced by: Lewis Gilbert
- Starring: Charles Aznavour; Alan Badel; Candice Bergen; Thommy Berggren; Delia Boccardo; Ernest Borgnine; Rossano Brazzi; Olivia de Havilland; Bekim Fehmiu; Anna Moffo; Leigh Taylor-Young
- Cinematography: Claude Renoir
- Edited by: Anne V. Coates
- Music by: Antonio Carlos Jobim
- Production company: Avco-Embassy Pictures
- Distributed by: Paramount Pictures
- Release date: March 25, 1970
- Running time: 177 minutes
- Country: United States
- Language: English
- Budget: $12 million
- Box office: $7,750,000 (US/ Canada rentals)

The Adventurers is a 1970 American epic adventure drama film directed, produced, and co-written by Lewis Gilbert. It is based on the 1966 novel of the same name by Harold Robbins.

The film stars Bekim Fehmiu, Candice Bergen, Charles Aznavour, Olivia de Havilland, Fernando Rey, Ernest Borgnine, Alan Badel, and Leigh Taylor-Young. The film was the American film debut of Yugoslavian actor Fehmiu and was shot in Europe and parts of South America. It is loosely based on the life of Dominican diplomat and playboy Porfirio Rubirosa.

Lewis Gilbert did the movie under a lucrative contract he had signed with Paramount following the success of Alfie. He called The Adventurers "the worst thing I ever did" and that the book was "impossible".

== Plot ==
Dax Xenos, a ten-year-old boy in the South American country of Corteguay, witnesses the rape and murder of his mother and teenage sister by government soldiers and runs to his father, Jaime, who is with a band of revolutionaries. Jaime's men capture the government soldiers, give Dax the privilege of personally executing his mother's murderers, and then take the boy to their hideout in the mountains, where he meets Amparo, the daughter of the revolutionary leader Rojo. After the rebels oust the dictator and establish Rojo as president, Dax accompanies his father to Rome, where Jaime is to serve as an ambassador.

Years later, Jaime returns to Corteguay to find that Rojo has established himself as a dictator. He contacts El Condor, the new revolutionary leader, but is killed by Colonel Gutierrez, Rojo's security chief. Dax, now a young man, returns to Corteguay for his father's funeral. Rojo persuades Dax, who does not know the cause of his father's death, to convince El Condor to surrender. However, when El Condor surrenders, he is killed by Gutierrez.

Because his promise to El Condor was betrayed, Dax murders Gutierrez, confronts Rojo with his betrayal, and returns to Rome. He becomes a gigolo and finally marries millionaire Sue Ann Daley, but they soon divorce. Dax again returns to Corteguay, this time for the unveiling of a statue of his father, and finds himself thrust into yet another revolution.

Led this time by El Lobo, the revolution succeeds when Dax murders Rojo. Meanwhile, Dax learns that Amparo has borne him a son. Delighted, he sends her back to Rome intending to establish a democracy in Corteguay and return to his new family. However, he is assassinated by the vengeful son of El Condor.

== Cast ==
- Bekim Fehmiu as Dax Xenos
  - Loris Loddi as young Dax
- Charles Aznavour as Marcel Campion
- Candice Bergen as Sue Ann Daley
- Alan Badel as President Rojo
- Thommy Berggren as Sergei Nikovitch
  - Carl Eklund as young Sergei
- Delia Boccardo as Caroline de Coyne
- Ernest Borgnine as Fat Cat
- Rossano Brazzi as Baron de Coyne
- Olivia de Havilland as Deborah Hadley
- Anna Moffo as Dania Leonardi
- Leigh Taylor-Young as Amparo Rojo
  - Roberta Donatelli as young Amparo
- Christian Roberts as Robert
  - Anthony Hickox as young Robert
- Fernando Rey as Jaime Xenos
- Yorgo Voyagis as El Lobo
- John Ireland as James Hadley
- Jorge Martínez de Hoyos as El Condor
- Sydney Tafler as Col. Gutierrez
- Yolande Donlan as Mrs. Erickson
- Angela Scoular as Denisonde
- Milena Vukotic as April
- Ferdy Mayne as Vladislav Nikovitch
- Jaclyn Smith as Belinda
- Katharine Balfour as Soledad
- Allan Cuthbertson as Hugh
- Zienia Merton as Marisa Xenos
- Roberta Haynes as Irina Xenos
- Michael Balfour as Detective
- Lois Maxwell as Woman at Fashion Show

== Production ==
Embassy Pictures purchased the screen rights to Harold Robbins' next novel in 1963 for $1 million, hiring John Michael Hayes to write a screenplay. When the novel The Adventurers was released in 1966, Paramount Pictures promoted the novel with a sweepstakes asking readers to submit their choices for casting with the winners to be awarded $500.

Gilbert commissioned Robbins to write the screenplay. After getting a draft, Gilbert informed Robbins that the script was “too dirty, too violent and too long.”

Gilbert said Paramount did not want any stars and wanted unknowns, as films with stars were failing. He did say the film "had a very good cast".

Principal photography began on August 12, 1968, at Cinecittà Studios, with other locations filmed in Rome and Venice. This was followed by 12 days of location shooting in New York City, and then three months of filming in Colombia in Bogotá, Cartagena, and the Andes Mountains.

=== Music ===
The score was composed by Bossa nova songwriter Antonio Carlos Jobim. Of the 12 songs featured in this film, three of them, "Children's Games" (Chovendo na Roseira), "A Bed of Flowers For Sue Ann" (Sue Ann) and "Dax & Amparo-Love Theme" (Olha Maria), went on to become some of Jobim's signature songs. These songs were heard for the first time on this soundtrack. The soft and often tender music stands in stark contrast to the darkness of the themes of the story.

A rare track by British band Family called "Young Love" was featured as a backing track to a fashion show in the film. This track does not appear on a CD by Family or on any singles.

== Release and reception ==
The Adventurers had a special "airborne world premiere" on February 23, 1970, as the in-flight movie of Trans World Airlines' first Boeing 747 Superjet flight between New York City and Los Angeles, with the film's stars and members of the press aboard. It marked the first time that a movie and a plane premiered in the same event. Additional test screenings occurred on March 4, 1970, at the DeMille Theatre in New York City and the Fox Village Theatre in Westwood, California. The pre-wide release version ran 205 minutes and was negatively received by the press and test audiences. Paramount re-cut the film at the last minute but several critics, including Pauline Kael and Joe Morgenstern, could not be convinced to watch it a second time. A wide release took place at over 100 U.S. theaters on March 25, 1970.

=== Critical ===
Howard Thompson of The New York Times opened his review by stating, "On the screen, 'The Adventurers' turn out to be an even duller bunch of meatballs than they were in Harold Robbins's best-selling novel." Arthur D. Murphy of Variety called it "a classic monument to bad taste ... marked by profligate and squandered production opulence; inferior, imitative and curiously old-hat direction; banal, ludicrous dialog; sub-standard, lifeless and embarrassing acting; cornball music; indulgent, gratuitous and boring violence; and luridly non-erotic sex." Gene Siskel of the Chicago Tribune gave the film 1 star out of 4 and wrote, "'The Adventurers' has nothing to recommend it. It is not erotic. It is not funny. It is violent to the point of obscenity and is as much the story of why film companies are losing millions as it is the story of Harold Robbins' best-selling novel."

Kevin Thomas of the Los Angeles Times stated that the film "is blatant in its borrowing from the more sensational headlines and naked in its manipulation of emotions to the susceptible," adding that "Gilbert is nothing if not consistent: the acting and the relentlessly risible dialogue are uniformly terrible." Gary Arnold of The Washington Post wrote, "Unfortunately, Lewis Gilbert's film version of the novel is quite faithful to the letter and spirit of the original. It alternates from slaughter to torpor to sex to torpor and back again to slaughter. Whatever the mode, the scenes are usually hideous or clumsy on their own terms and useless as clues to subsequent events or the characters' motives." The Monthly Film Bulletin called it "A three-hour slog through every imaginable cliché of writing and direction" and further remarked, "This might be described as the film with everything; trouble is, it is difficult to imagine anybody wanting any of it."

By the 2000s, reviews have found The Adventurers entertaining as an unintentional comedy. In 2005, it was listed in The Official Razzie Movie Guide as one of the Top Ten Best Bad films of all time, with author John Wilson writing that the movie "ha[s] not even one believable character, performance, or line of dialogue. But it’s all done with such utter sincerity that it’s far more entertaining than this same material would be in the hands of anyone but utter incompetents." Paul Mavis, reviewing the Warner Archive DVD release for Movies & Drinks, enjoyed its outrageousness, stating The Adventurers is, "part faux-David Lean, part lurid comic book with funny accents and naked breasts--and all of it an irresistible, frequently maddening mess." He believes that the mixing of Third World politics and jet-setting was inspired by international playboy Porfirio Rubirosa.

Director Lewis Gilbert said on June 25, 2010, on the BBC radio program Desert Island Discs, that The Adventurers was "a big, sprawling, very expensive film which was a disaster. I should never have made it. It's one I'm not proud of."

== Home media ==
Paramount Home Entertainment first released the film on a widescreen DVD on July 12, 2005. The same company rereleased the film in the Warner Archive Collection on September 24, 2013. The DVD was edited and re-rated PG, with significant cuts to scenes in which women are raped and killed by soldiers.

== See also ==
- List of American films of 1970
