= Daniel Beretta =

French actor (1946–2024)

- Born: Daniel Jean Georges Beretta; 24 December 1946; Audincourt, Doubs, France
- Died: 23 March 2024 (aged 77); Ajaccio, Corse-du-Sud, France
- Occupation: Actor

Daniel Beretta (24 December 1946 – 23 March 2024) was a French actor. He dubbed over Arnold Schwarzenegger in the French versions of all his films from 1987.

== Biography ==
Daniel Beretta was born in Audincourt, Doubs on 24 December 1946. He started learning how to play piano at the age of 3. He later took theatre courses at Montbéliard. He performed in his first play, Copain Clopants, in 1966. Catherine Allégret, who was in the audience, introduced Beretta to Marcel Camus, who put Beretta in his first film role in A Savage Summer. Beretta went on to star in more plays, including Jesus Christ Superstar and The Umbrellas of Cherbourg.

Beretta voiced programme trailers on the French channel 'Sci Fi', and, between 2000 and 2008, was the station voice of the national adult contemporary radio station RFM.

Beretta died on 23 March 2024, at the age of 77.

== Filmography ==
=== Films ===
- Red Heat (Ivan Danko)
- Total Recall (Douglas Quaid)
- The Hunt for Red October (Oliver Wendell "Skip" Tyler)
- Kindergarten Cop (Detective John Kimble)
- Terminator 2: Judgment Day (The Terminator T-800 Model 101)
- Beauty and the Beast (Lumière)
- Last Action Hero (Jack Slater, Arnold Schwarzenegger)
- True Romance (Drexl Spivey)
- The Nightmare Before Christmas (The Mayor of Halloweentown)
- True Lies (Harry Tasker)
- Junior (Doctor Alex Hesse)
- Ghost in the Shell (Batō)
- Eraser (U.S. Marshal John Kruger)
- Jingle All the Way (Howard Langston)
- Batman & Robin (Mr. Freeze)
- End of Days (Jericho Cane)
- Analyze This (Primo Sindone)
- The 6th Day (Adam Gibson)
- Collateral Damage (Gordy Brewer)
- Liberty's Kids (Friedrich Wilhelm von Steuben)
- The Rundown (Bar patron)
- Resident Evil (The grave voice in the opening that reads the text)
- K-19: The Widowmaker (Mikhail Polenin)
- Terminator 3: Rise of the Machines (The Terminator)
- Around the World in 80 Days (Prince Hapi)
- Ghost in the Shell: Stand Alone Complex (Batō)

=== Television series ===
- Weird Science (Papa Magnifico, Cyborg Sam)
- Chris Colorado (William Erwin Krantz)
- Dead Like Me (Rube John Sofer)
- Donkey Kong Country (King K. Rool, Krusha)

=== Video games ===
- XIII (Number XIII)
- Painkiller (Daniel Garner)
- Team Fortress 2 (Heavy Weapons Guy)
- Splinter Cell Conviction (Sam Fisher)
- Duke Nukem Forever (Duke Nukem)
