= Day of Anger =

1967 film by Tonino Valerii

- Italian film poster
- Directed by: Tonino Valerii
- Screenplay by: Ernesto Gastaldi; Tonino Valerii; Renzo Genta
- Based on: Der Tod ritt dienstags by Rolf Becker (as Ron Barker)
- Produced by: Alfonso Sansone; Henryk Chrosicki
- Starring: Lee Van Cleef; Giuliano Gemma; Walter Rilla; Christa Linder
- Cinematography: Enzo Serafin
- Edited by: Franco Fraticelli
- Music by: Riz Ortolani
- Production companies: Sancrosiap; Corona Filmproduktion; Divina-Film
- Distributed by: Consorzio Italiano Distributori Indipendenti Film (CIDIF)
- Release dates: 19 December 1967 (Italy); 12 January 1968 (West Germany)
- Running time: 114 minutes
- Countries: Italy; West Germany
- Box office: ₤1.977 billion

Day of Anger (Italian: I giorni dell'ira [i ˈdʒorni delˈliːra], lit. "The Days of Wrath") is a 1967 Spaghetti Western film directed and co-written by Tonino Valerii and starring Lee Van Cleef and Giuliano Gemma, and features a musical score by Riz Ortolani. The film credits the novel Der Tod ritt dienstags ("Death Rode on Tuesdays") by Ron Barker (Rolf O. Becker) as its basis, although Valerii and screenwriter Ernesto Gastaldi have attested that this credit was primarily included to appease the West German co-producers, and that although some scenes are partially borrowed from it, the film is not an adaptation of Becker's novel.

Day of Anger was Valerii's second film, as well as his second Spaghetti Western, following Taste for Killing. Valerii went on to film his third Spaghetti Western, The Price of Power, also featuring Gemma, in 1969. The 86" version was released on home media as Days of Wrath.

== Plot ==
Scott is a young man working as a street sweeper in the town of Clifton, Arizona. Scott is looked down upon by the town people, as he has never known his father and only knows his mother's first name was Mary. The only two people who show him respect and friendship are Murph Allan Short, a former gunslinger, and Blind Bill, a partially blind old beggar. When Frank Talby rides into town and kills Perkins, one of Scott's bullies, Scott realizes the opportunity to change his life, and decides to prove his worth as a gunfighter to him. Talby soon leaves town to go after Wild Jack, his former associate, who owes him 50,000 dollars of a planned robbery. Scott follows him and Talby reluctantly lets him tag along and agrees to teach him ten essential rules about gunfighting.

Talby and Scott find Wild Jack, but the criminal tells the pair that he does not have the money anymore, as he was double-crossed by a group of Clifton's most seemingly respectable citizens, the same citizens who despised and mistreated Scott. A gunfight ensues and Scott manages to convince Talby of his skills with a revolver. After taking care of Wild Jack's gang, the pair return to Clifton, where Scott changes his name to "Scott Mary", after Talby's suggestion. Scott showcases his shooting skills to those who resented him, and quickly becomes a feared man.

With Scott's help Talby takes over the town, killing first Perkins' gang and later the inner circle who runs Clifton and conspired to kill Talby when he revealed their dirty secret. Talby becomes the de facto town manager and Scott his second-in-command. Nevertheless, Scott's old friend Murph, who taught Scott how to shoot, explains to Scott that his fast draw and accuracy has now become a threat to Talby, who is aging and wants to settle in Clifton. Soon after, Murph takes the Sheriff's badge and forbids the carrying of guns. Scott warns Talby not to mess with his former mentor, but Talby obliquely says that he won't back down.

Murph knows that he can't defeat Talby in a duel, but he still decides to face him, as he also knows that in doing so Scott will finally realize that Talby and his ruthless ways are not Scott's true path. When Murph comes to take Talby's gun with Scott watching, Talby shoots and kills him in cold blood. Accordingly, Scott flees in anger and decides to settle things in a shoot-out. Scott finds that Murph left him famous gunfighter Doc Holliday's gun, adjusted for quick fire, as well as some instructions on how to defeat Talby. Scott defeats Talby's gang by taking advantage of the rules Talby once taught him, and then kills Talby in an open duel. Triumphant but despondent, Scott discards his gun and walks away from the scene of the duel with Blind Bill.

== Cast ==
- Giuliano Gemma as Scott Mary
- Lee Van Cleef as Frank Talby
- Walter Rilla as Murph Allan Short
- Andrea Bosic as Abel Murray
- Al Mulock as Jack "Wild Jack"
- Lukas Ammann as Judge Cutcher
- Anna Orso as Eileen Cutcher
- Ennio Balbo as Turner
- Pepe Calvo as Bill "Blind Bill"
- Christa Linder as Gwen
- Giorgio Gargiullo as Sheriff Nigel
- Yvonne Sanson as Vivien Skill
- Benito Stefanelli as Owen White
- Franco Balducci as "Slim"
- Paolo Magalotti as Deputy Cross
- Ferruccio Viotti as Sam Corbitt
- Romano Puppo as Hart Perkins
- Vladimir Medar as "Old Man" Perkins
- Ricardo Palacios as Bowie Bartender
- Nazzareno Natale as Wild Jack's Henchman
- Román Ariznavarreta as Wild Jack's Henchman
- Virgilio Gazzolo as Mr. Barton
- Eleonora Morana as Mrs. Barton
- Fulvio Mingozzi as Bank Teller
- Giancarlo Bastianoni as Talby's Henchman
- Angelo Susani as Talby's Henchman
- Nino Nini as Dr. Cullen
- Hans Otto Alberty as Blonde Deputy With Harmonica
- Omero Capanna as Perkins' Henchman

== Release ==
Day of Anger was released in Italy on December 19, 1967 and in Germany on January 12, 1968. Westerns were especially popular in Italy in 1967. Among the top 15 films of the year, eight were Westerns. The highest-grossing film of the year was God Forgives... I Don't!; the second was Day of Anger which grossed a total of 1,997,440,000 Italian lire domestically. The Italian board of censors rated Day of Anger as V.M.14, meaning it was forbidden to audiences under 14 years of age. In February 1968, Sansone and Chrosicki submitted another version of the film cutting it down to 111 minutes and 11 seconds opposed to the originals 115 minutes and 18 seconds which toned the violent scenes which passed with a "Per Tutti" rating allowing it to be viewed by all audiences.

Day of Anger opened in the United States in 1969 with two different versions: a longer one rated M and another one cut to 85 minutes which was re-titled The Days of Wrath and Gunlaw.

=== Home video ===
Day of Anger was released on DVD and Blu-ray by Arrow Video on March 31, 2015. Video Watchdog commented that the release was "a substantial improvement over the older "PAL-converted, non-anamorphic release" and that "The 2K scanned 2.35:1 presentation looks spotless and extremely sharp, with nicely saturated colors and excellent detail."

The release includes a shorter (by 28 minutes) cut of the film distributed internationally, and was described by Video Watchdog as "a poor re-edit of the movie that all but ruins it." The Day of Wrath version includes one extra scene not in the longer version of the film. The review concluded that it "may be welcomed by [completists], but we would recommend avoiding it."

== Reception ==
In contemporary reviews, the Monthly Film Bulletin stated that "Until about halfway through this is a quite likable variation on an old Western theme." but that as Talby's involvement in the story becomes less prominent, "plot interest wanes" and "as credibility takes off into wish-fulfilment and interest dwindles to vanishing point". Roger Greenspun (The New York Times) found the film to be "strange and muddled [...] very long and mostly boring, depending for its plot upon notions of class and caste that seem foreign to the genre if not to real history." "Robe." of Variety found the film to give Lee Van Cleef "a bit more character than the Italo-Western usually provides" and that "technical credits are generally excellent with one of those Riz Ortolani scores which he must grind out overnight" eventually concluding that the film was "No better, no worse, than predecessors"

From retrospective reviews, in his investigation of narrative structures in Spaghetti Western films, Fridlund ranges Day of Anger, together with Death Rides a Horse as prime examples of a "tutorship variation" that further develops the play on age/experience between the protagonists in For a Few Dollars More, with Lee Van Cleef playing the older partner in all three films. In the "Tutorship" films a younger protagonist seeks the more or less reluctant partnership of an older one, but differences of motivation eventually bring them into conflict. Kim Newman (Sight & Sound) noted that the film "unusually combines the mythic characterisation frequently found in the genre with a more nuanced, complicated vision of society and violence." and that Gemma's character of Scott is "a rare spaghetti-western hero with a character arc" and that the ending is "deeply ambiguous". Newman commented on the secondary characters as "all thing archetypes" but that Gemma, Van Cleef and Rilla are "impressive."

== Bibliography ==
- Hughes, Howard (2010). Spaghetti Westerns. Harpenden: Kamera Books. ISBN 978-1-84243-303-4.
- Curti, Robert (2016). Tonino Valerii: The Films. McFarland. ISBN 978-1476664682.
