= Robert Iannucci =

Americana computer scientist

- Education: PhD
- Alma mater: MIT
- Occupation: computer scientist

Robert Alan Iannucci is a computer scientist.

After earning his PhD from MIT in 1988, he joined IBM in the development of mainframes. He then founded Exa Corporation, where he oversaw the company's marketing. In November 1995 he joined Digital Equipment Corporation (DEC), and after Compaq's acquisition of DEC, served as VP of corporate research in the new company. Iannucci became head of Nokia's Research Center in May 2007, then chief technology officer of Nokia in 2008, before stepping down that September.In 2012 Robert Iannucci became the Director of the Cylab Mobility Research Center at Carnegie Mellon University Silicon Valley.

== Bibliography ==
- Multithreaded computer architecture: a summary of the state of the art. Kluwer Academic Publishing. 1994. ISBN 0-7923-9477-1.
