= Heavy Music =

"Heavy Music Part 1"
- French release picture sleeve

Single by Bob Seger & the Last Heard
- B-side: "Heavy Music Part 2"
- Released: Summer 1967
- Genre: Rock
- Length: 2:33
- Label: Cameo-Parkway
- Songwriter(s): Bob Seger
- Producer(s): Doug Brown

Bob Seger & the Last Heard singles chronology
"Vagrant Winter" (1967)	"Heavy Music Part 1" (1967)	"2 + 2 = ?" (1968)

"Heavy Music"

Song by Bob Seger & the Silver Bullet Band

from the album Live Bullet
- Released: 1976
- Recorded: September 1975
- Venue: Cobo Hall, Detroit, Michigan
- Genre: Rock
- Length: 8:14
- Label: Capitol
- Songwriter(s): Bob Seger

"Heavy Music" is a song first released as a single by Bob Seger & the Last Heard. Two different vocal takes of the song (using the same instrumental track) were released together on either side of the single, with the names "Heavy Music Part 1" and "Heavy Music Part 2". An eight-minute fourteen-second-long live version of the song is featured on the album Live Bullet with the Silver Bullet Band.

== Writing and production ==
The song is about listening to music and the emotions it evokes, but misunderstandings arose. Seger denied those took a sexual reading of the lyric: "A lot of people really misconstrued it. That was a song about the music, but a lot of people thought it was a song about music and sex, the two together. There was nothing sexual in it, it was simply read in by a lot of program directors. The part about 'goin' deeper.'"

== Success ==
The single proved to be Seger's most successful work to date, climbing to the number one position on the Detroit charts and gaining him some exposure outside of the Detroit area. For a time it looked like it would be Seger's ticket to a national breakthrough, until the label Cameo-Parkway went out of business just as the song was gaining popularity. The track ended up peaking at number 103 nationally in the US on Billboard; it was actually a bigger hit in Canada, peaking at number 82 on the RPM charts. Still, the success of "Heavy Music" aided in landing Seger his first contract with Capitol Records.

== In popular culture ==
Heavy Music was utilized for the American trailers for three Westerns starring Tony Anthony: A Stranger in Town (1967), Blindman (1971) and Get Mean (1975). This creative decision was likely fostered by Allen Klein, the producer of the first two films, who had acquired the single's label Cameo-Parkway Records by the time A Stranger in Town was being prepared for its US release.

== Chart performance ==
Chart (1967)	Peak position
U.S. Billboard Bubbling Under the Hot 100	103
U.S. Cash Box Top 100	70
Canada RPM Top 100	82
