= Pete, Pearl & the Pole =

1974 film

Pete, Pearl and the Pole
- US film poster
- Directed by: Vance Lewis
- Screenplay by: Norman Thaddeus Vane
- Story by: Tony Anthony
- Produced by: Tony Anthony
- Starring: Tony Anthony; Adolfo Celi; Lucretia Love; Richard Conte; Lionel Stander; Irene Papas
- Cinematography: Riccardo Pallottini
- Edited by: Roberto Perpignani
- Music by: Louis Armstrong
- Production company: ABKCO Films
- Distributed by: Produzioni Atlas Consorziate (P.A.C.) (Italy); National General Pictures (US)
- Release date: March 3, 1973
- Running time: 90 minutes
- Countries: United States; Italy
- Language: English

Pete, Pearl & the Pole (Italian: Piazza pulita, lit. "A clean sweep"), also known as 1931: Once Upon a Time in New York, is a 1973 Italian-American gangster film directed by Luigi Vanzi (credited as Vance Lewis) and starring Tony Anthony.

== Cast ==
- Tony Anthony as Pete Di Benedetto
- Adolfo Celi as The Pole
- Lucretia Love as Pearl
- Richard Conte as Bruno
- Corrado Gaipa as Mob Boss
- Irene Papas as Donna Mimma
- Lionel Stander as Sparks
- Raf Baldassarre as Raf, Pole's Henchman

== Production ==
The film was shot mainly on location with predominantly American funding.

The film originated as a story written by actor Tony Anthony, with whom director Luigi Vanzi had previously shot The Stranger series of Spaghetti Westerns (A Stranger in Town, The Stranger Returns, and The Silent Stranger). This was Vanzi's last film.

== Release ==
The film was released on March 3, 1973. It was distributed by P.A.C. in Italy.
