= Jonathan Banks filmography =

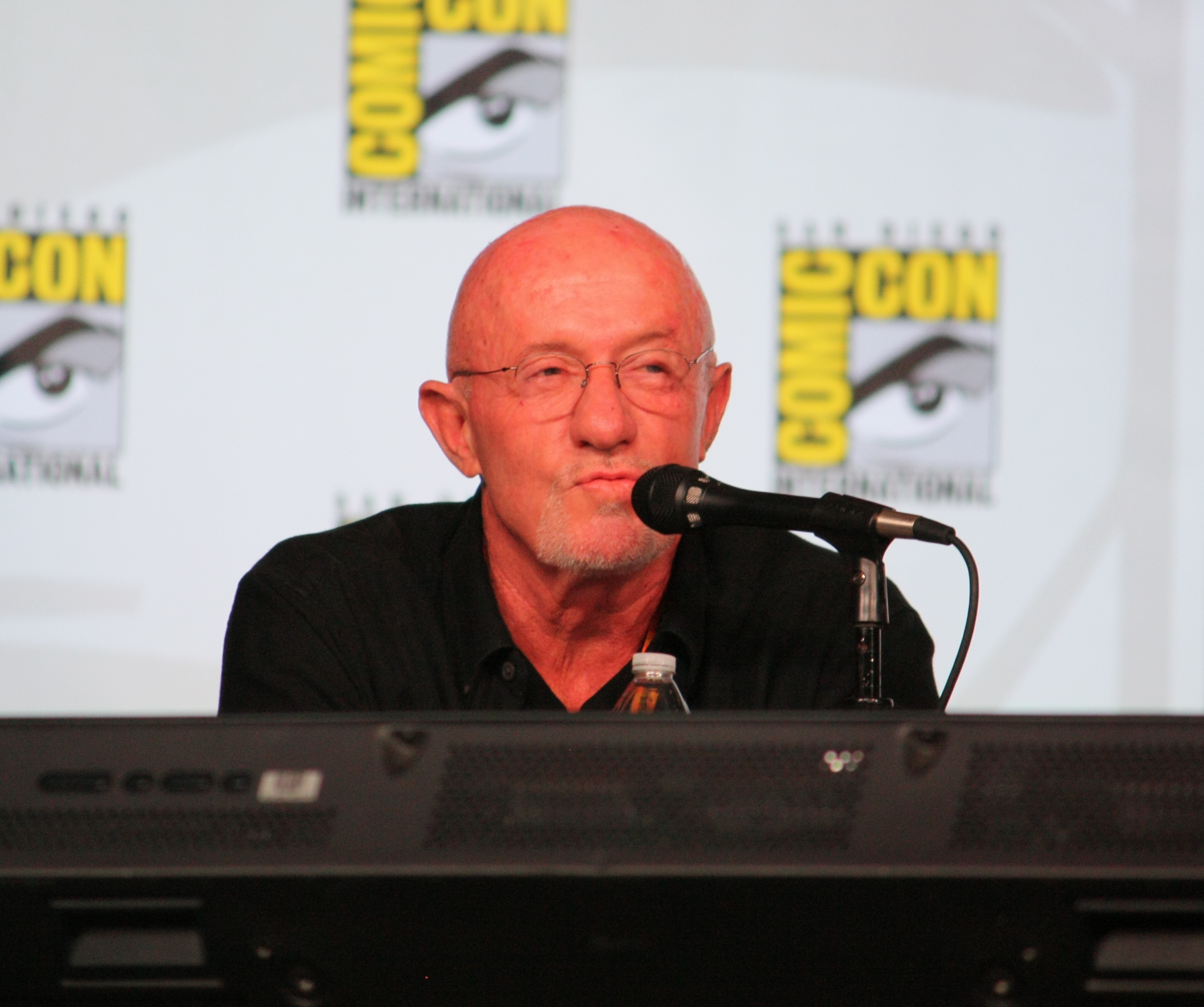
Jonathan Banks in 2012

Jonathan Banks (born January 31, 1947) is an American actor. His first notable film roles were in the films Airplane! (1980), 48 Hrs. (1982), and Beverly Hills Cop (1984). He has received critical acclaim for his role as Mike Ehrmantraut in the television series Breaking Bad (2009–2012), its spin-off series Better Call Saul (2015–2022), and its sequel film, El Camino: A Breaking Bad Movie (2019). He is also known for his breakthrough role as Frank McPike in Wiseguy (1987–1990). Since 2025, he has voiced Brit in the adult animated superhero television series Invincible.

He has received six Primetime Emmy Award nominations for Outstanding Supporting Actor in a Drama Series (1989, 2013, 2015–2017, 2019) for his work on all three series, making him the only actor to be nominated in this category for three different shows, two of which feature him as the same character.

== Filmography ==
=== Film ===
Year	Title	Role	Notes
1978	Coming Home	Marine At Party	
1978	The Cheap Detective	Cabbie	
1978	Who'll Stop the Rain	Marine	
1979	The Rose	Television Promoter	
1980	Airplane!	Gunderson	
1980	Stir Crazy	Jack Graham	
1981	Gangster Wars	Dutch Schultz	
1982	Frances	The Hitchhiker	
1982	48 Hrs.	Detective Algren	
1984	Gremlins	Deputy Brent Frye	
1984	The Adventures of Buckaroo Banzai Across the 8th Dimension	Lizardo Hospital Guard	
1984	Beverly Hills Cop	Zack	
1986	Armed and Dangerous	Clyde Klepper	
1987	Cold Steel	Isaac "Iceman"	
1988	Pin	Pin	Voice
1990	Honeymoon Academy	Pitt	
1992	Freejack	Mark Michelette	
1992	There Goes the Neighborhood	Harry "Handsome Harry"	
1993	Boiling Point	Max Waxman	
1995	Under Siege 2: Dark Territory	Scotty	
1996	Flipper	Dirk Moran	
1996	Dark Breed	Commander Joe Shay	
1999	Let the Devil Wear Black	Satch	
1999	Foolish	"Numbers"	
1999	Trash	Judge Callum	
2001	Crocodile Dundee in Los Angeles	Milos Drubnik	
2001	Proximity	Price	
2002	Dark Blue	Deputy Chief Jimmy Barcomb	
2002	R.S.V.P.	Walter Franklin	
2006	Puff, Puff, Pass	Lance	
2007	Reign Over Me	Dr. Stelter	
2008	Proud American	Mr. Moretti	
2012	Watercolor Postcards	Ledball	
2013	Identity Thief	Paolo Gordon	
2013	Roar	Bernie Warren	Short film
2014	Bullet	Carlito Kane	
2014	Authors Anonymous	David Kelleher	
2014	Horrible Bosses 2	Detective Hatcher	
2016	Term Life	Harper	
2016	Alibi	Billy	Short film
2017	Mudbound	"Pappy" McAllan	
2018	The Commuter	Walt	
2018	Incredibles 2	Rick Dicker	Voice
2018	Redbad	Pepin of Herstal	
2019	El Camino: A Breaking Bad Movie	Mike Ehrmantraut	
2022	Catwoman: Hunted	Black Mask	Voice

=== Television films ===
Year	Title	Role	Notes
1976	The Macahans	Woodward	
1977	Alexander: The Other Side of Dawn	Michael	
1977	The Night They Took Miss Beautiful	Buck	
1979	She's Dressed to Kill	Rudy Striker	
1980	Desperate Voyage	Louis	
1983	The Invisible Woman	Darren	
1983	Murder Me, Murder You	Janos Saracen	
1984	Nadia	Gheorge Comaneci	
1986	The Fifth Missile	Ray Olson	
1986	Assassin	Earl Dickman	
1986	Who Is Julia	Jack Bodine	
1991	Don't Touch My Daughter	Ryter	
1993	Blind Side	Aaron	
1997	Melanie Darrow	Arthur Abbott	
1997	A Thousand Men and a Baby	Father Edward O'Reilly	
1998	Dollar for the Dead	Colonel Skinner	

=== Television series ===
Year	Title	Role	Notes
1976	Barnaby Jones	Vince Gentry	Episode: "Dead Heat"
1977	Family	Attendant	Episode: "Taking Chances: Part I"
1977	Barnaby Jones	Car Salesman	Episode: "Duet for Dying"
1977	Carter Country	Bob Phillips	Episode: "The Fireside Burnside Budget Chat"
1979	Lou Grant	Clay Starkes	Episode: "Kidnap"
1979	The Waltons	Jeb Sanders	Episode: "The Wager"
1979	Lou Grant	Cyrus	Episode: "Sweep"
1980	Little House on the Prairie	Jed	Episode: "Darkness Is My Friend"
1981	Lou Grant	The Intruder	Episode: "Rape"
1981	Sanford	Al	Episode: "Cal the Coward"
1981	The Gangster Chronicles	Dutch Schultz	13 episodes
1981	Best of the West	Hombre	2 episodes
1982	Report to Murphy	Vinny	Episode: "Papillon"
1982–1983	T. J. Hooker	Danny Scott / Freddy Baker	2 episodes
1983	Hill Street Blues	Reggie	2 episodes
1983	Whiz Kids	Unknown	Episode: "Programmed For Murder"
1984	Jessie	Ernie Ross	Episode: "Pilot"
1984	Cagney & Lacey	Keith Edsin	Episode: "Old Debts"
1985	Otherworld	Commander Nuveen Kroll	8 episodes
1985	Hunter	Detective Gary Krewson	Episode: "The Big Fall"
1987	Falcon Crest	Kolinksi	8 episodes
1987	Designing Women	Eldon Ashcroft IV	Episode: "101 Ways to Decorate a Gas Station"
1987–1990	Wiseguy	Frank McPike	74 episodes
1993	Star Trek: Deep Space Nine	Shel-La	Episode: "Battle Lines"
1994	Highlander: The Series	Mako	Episode: "Under Colour of Authority"
1994	Matlock	Jack Starling	Episode: "The P.I."
1994	Walker, Texas Ranger	Shelby Valentine	Episode: "Deadly Reunion"
1994	Tales from the Crypt	William	Episode: "The Assassin"
1995	Due South	Garret	Episode: "Heaven and Earth"
1995	Women of the House	Jim Sugarbaker	2 episodes
1994–1995	SeaQuest 2032	Maximillian Scully	2 episodes
1996	Diagnosis: Murder	Max Jupe	Episode: "Murder by Friendly Fire"
1997–1998	Fired Up	Guy Mann	28 episodes
2000	Diagnosis: Murder	Bruce Locatelli	Episode: "Murder by Remote"
2000–2001	The Trouble With Normal	Dr. Lowell	2 episodes
2001	The District	Monya Pastov	Episode: "Fools Russian: Part I"
2003	Alias	Frederick Brandon	2 episodes
2003	Strong Medicine	Frank Hardwyck	Episode: "Skin"
2004	Joan of Arcadia	Sheriff Mike Rakowski	Episode: "Jump"
2004–2006	CSI: Crime Scene Investigation	Bobby Jensen	2 episodes
2005	E-Ring	Admiral Cooper	4 episodes
2006	Ghost Whisperer	Lyle Chase	Episode: "Friendly Neighborhood Ghost"
2006	Without a Trace	Sal Marcello	Episode: "Check Your Head"
2006–2007	Day Break	Shadow Man	7 episodes
2007	Dexter	FBI Deputy Director Max Adams	2 episodes
2008	ER	Robert Truman	Episode: "Atonement"
2008	Shark	Jason Normandy	2 episodes
2008	Life	Nathan Gray	Episode: "Crushed"
2008	Eli Stone	Agent Johnathan Maine	Episode: "Owner of a Lonely Heart"
2009	Lie to Me	Ex-FBI Agent Bitcher	Episode: "Sacrifice"
2009	Cold Case	John Clark	Episode: "Jackals"
2009	Castle	Bruce Kirby	Episode: "Hell Hath No Fury"
2009–2012	Breaking Bad	Mike Ehrmantraut	25 episodes
2011	Modern Family	Donnie Pritchett	Episode: "The Musical Man"
2011	Two and a Half Men	Pawn Broker	Episode: "A Fishbowl Full of Glass Eyes"
2011	CSI: Miami	Oscar Duarte	Episode: "Long Gone"
2012	Ringer	Remy Osterman	2 episodes
2012	Parks and Recreation	Steve Wyatt	Episode: "Ben's Parents"
2012	Vegas	Angelo LaFlatta	2 episodes
2013	Bloodline	Leo Killpriest	Pilot
2013	Body of Proof	Glenn Fitz	Episode: "Daddy Issue"
2013–2015	Axe Cop	Various Voices	3 episodes
2014	Community	Professor Buzz Hickey	11 episodes
2014	Mike Tyson Mysteries	The Wizard	Voice, episode: "Is Magic Real?"
2015–2022	Better Call Saul	Mike Ehrmantraut	59 episodes
2015	The Lizzie Borden Chronicles	Mr. Flowers	3 episodes
2015	Major Lazer	The Law	Voice, episode: "Escape from Rave Island"
2015	Gravity Falls	Filbrick Pines	Voice, episode: "A Tale of Two Stans"
2015	Robot Chicken	Composite Superman	Voice, episode: "Magical Friendship"
2015	The Expanse	Executive Officer	Episode: "Dulcinea"
2015	MythBusters	Mike Ehrmantraut	Episode: "Supernatural Shooters"
2015	Last Week Tonight	Himself	Episode: "Sex Education"
2016–2018	Skylanders Academy	Eruptor	Voice, 38 episodes
2017	Dr. Ken	Dr. Erwin	Episode: "Ken's Professor"
2017–2020	Tangled: The Series	Quirin	Voice, 8 episodes
2020–2021	F Is for Family	William Murphy	Voice, 12 episodes
2020	The Casagrandes	Coach Crawford	Voice, episode: "Team Effort"
2020	The Comey Rule	James Clapper	2 episodes
2021	A Tale Dark & Grimm	Johannes	Voice, 7 episodes
2024	Kite Man: Hell Yeah!	Sean Noonan	Voice, 10 episodes
2024	Constellation	Henry/Bud Caldera	8 episodes
2025	Invincible	Brit	Voice, episode "What Have I Done?"
2025	Phineas and Ferb	Driving Instructor Brian	Voice, episode "License to Bust"
2025	The Beast in Me	Martin Jarvis	
2026	SpongeBob SquarePants	Don Scarfish	Voice, episode: "Sounds Like Trouble"

=== Video games ===
Year	Title	Role	Notes
2015	Batman: Arkham Knight	Commissioner James Gordon	Grouped under "Voiceover & Mocap Talent"
2018	Lego The Incredibles	Rick Dicker	Grouped under 'Featuring the Voice Talents of:"
