= Comin' at Ya! =

1981 film

- US film poster
- Directed by: Ferdinando Baldi
- Written by: Lloyd Battista; Wolf Lowenthal; Gene Quintano
- Story by: Tony Pettito
- Produced by: Tony Anthony
- Starring: Tony Anthony; Gene Quintano; Victoria Abril; Ricardo Palacios
- Cinematography: Fernando Arribas
- Edited by: Franco Fraticelli
- Music by: Carlo Savina
- Production company: The Lupo-Anthony-Quintano Company
- Distributed by: Filmways Pictures
- Release date: August 28, 1981; (wide)
- Running time: 91 minutes
- Countries: Italy; Spain; United States
- Language: English
- Budget: $2.5 million
- Box office: $12 million or $5 million

Comin' at Ya! is a Spanish-American 3D Western film, featuring Tony Anthony, Victoria Abril and Gene Quintano and directed by Ferdinando Baldi.

It was produced as a co-production between American company Filmways and The Lupo-Anthony-Quintano Company, an independent company. Released in 1981, the film effectively started the 3D film boom of the early 1980s. The same filmmakers returned in 1983 with Treasure of the Four Crowns.

== Plot ==
H.H. Hart, a bank robber, loses his wife to kidnappers on their wedding day. Subsequently, she is traded as a prostitute by villain Pike Thompson. H.H. Hart races against time to find his wife, with the help of a Scottish preacher. The film features many 3D effects, many of which are intended to "fly off the screen" at the audience.

== Cast ==
- Tony Anthony as H.H. Hart
- Gene Quintano as Pike Thompson
- Victoria Abril as Abeline
- Ricardo Palacios as Polk Thompson
- Lewis Gordon as The Preacher

== Development ==
Quintano and Lupo were Xerox salesmen who formed their own office supply firm who were interested in getting into filmmaking. They were partners in a publishing firm with Tony Anthony, a filmmaker who had made a number of spaghetti westerns. Looking for an angle they decided to make a film in 3-D, believing many younger film goers would not be familiar with it.

3-D had been a brief craze in the early 1950s with films such as Bwana Devil but quickly fell out of fashion. It was also a Western when those films were not very common.

Quintano and his partners worked for four years on the film, experimenting and testing the technology.

They decided to make a Western instead of a horror movie as they believed the market was over-saturated with horror. They managed to get a distribution deal but had to raise the funds themselves. It took them three months. (Some said the budget was $2.5 million other sources say $3.5 million.)

== Shooting ==
Filming started in Spain in September 1980 and took three months. Post production was done in Rome.

Anthony admitted the film was not Citizen Kane in terms of quality. "You wouldn't make Citizen Kane' in 3-D", he said. "This is escapism. This is The Perils of Pauline. (Note: When Anthony referred to The Perils of Pauline, it is unclear whether he meant the 1914 film serial, the 1933 film serial, the 1947 film or the 1967 film.) It's a laugh. It's enjoyment. It's putting the audience in the theater in the picture. At one point in the picture, I'm running toward the camera with all kinds of things, tomahawks, arrows, being thrown at me. I go off to the right and you – you in the audience – think the tomahawk is going to hit you. They called it a gimmick 25 years ago. It may still be a gimmick, but today it's a gimmick for a new generation. Let's give it a try."

== Stereoscopic 3-D process ==
Comin' at Ya was filmed in the over-and-under, single-strip 35 mm 3-D format. Two Techniscope-format frames, one for the left-eye image and one for the right-eye image, are stacked one above the other in the same area as one ordinary 'Scope-format frame. The resulting frames, though diminished in size, yielded a nominal aspect ratio of 2.39:1.

The lens system used was Optimax III (Bill Bukowski of Optimax III served as 3D Technical Advisor), notorious for introducing vertical parallax error owing to its flawed design (i.e., the optical axes of its twin lenses are not at the same horizontal level). The film's posters by turns heralded the 3-D process as SuperVision and WonderVision.

Projection required prismatic or "mirror box" converters in front of an ordinary spherical projection lens. These converters were meant to converge the stacked left and right pictures on the screen, at the same time cross-polarizing them to match the filters in the 3-D glasses worn by the audience.

Gene Quintano was a producer. He says he appeared in the film "mostly as a matter of economics. Tony is the star and he's very good but this is not an actor's film. I mean, Robert Redford is not going to be sweating it out. The real star is supposed to be the 3-D."

== Filmways ==
The movie was acquired for US release at the American Film Market in early 1981 by Filmways. Filmways had just bought out American International Pictures and were in a state of flux at the time, having unloaded four major films, The Fan, Blade Runner, Halloween II and Ragtime. President Robert Meyers had once been in business with the film's sales representative and offered to buy the film for the US if it had no other offers. Although the film sold well internationally, getting the producers their money back, no other offers came through and so Meyers honored his promise. "We thought if we were lucky we might show the film in someone's basement every few years", said Quintano.

== Release ==
The film was previewed in July 1981 in only two cities, Phoenix and Kansas City. Anthony and Quintano ordered only 90,000 pairs of the 3-D glasses needed to watch the film. The film did spectacular business, easily out grossing per cinema Filmways' other film at the time, Blow Out. By August the studio decided to expand the film to as many cinemas that could take 3-D.

"They can't make the glasses fast enough", said Anthony. "They've been selling them at an average of 40,000-per-theater. At 1 in the morning the other day I got a call that we'll be opening in 200 theaters between now and the 21st. This isn't a film – it's a military operation!"

The order for glasses was increased to five million pairs. Arthur Silverstein, sales manager of the Hudson Printing Company in Manhattan, said he had to put his employees on overtime to turn out the disposable polarized glasses. "They give a remarkable special effect", he said, "and I don't even have anything to do with the movie. In fact, it's a dynamite effect. It literally puts you in the action, and you do see things coming at you."

The film did not sustain its original business however.

== Legacy ==
The film kicked off a spate of movies in 3D including Jaws 3-D, Amityville 3-D, Spacehunter: Adventures in the Forbidden Zone, Starchaser: The Legend of Orin, Abra Cadabra, Parasite, and Friday the 13th Part III.

== Follow Up ==
Anthony said he wanted to make a sword and sorcery film as follow up Seeing is Believing. "I've got to be very careful about my decisions from here on in", he said. "If I make a mistake, it could take me 10 years to get back to this point." However Quintano wanted to make a Topkapi type film about people stealing an item on an island. This became Treasure of the Four Crowns.

== DVD release ==
This film was released on DVD in the Anaglyph 3D process. The conversion procedure involved separating the over and under images and digitally combining them as red and cyan images layered over each other.

== Reissue & Blu-ray 3D Release ==
In May 2009, a new restoration of the film was announced. In late January 2011 it was announced by Fangoria magazine that they would be sponsoring the film's premiere screening. The premiere screening of this newly restored version was held at the Berlin Film Festival on February 12, 2011.

In January 2016, for the movie's 35th anniversary, a remastered version supervised by the film's producer and star Tony Anthony was released for home video in the Blu-ray 3D format, which includes new 5.1 surround sound.
