= Gene Quintano =

American film director

Gene Quintano (born 1946 as Eugene Francis Quintano Jr.) is an American screenwriter, actor, film producer and director. He is best known for writing sequels to the film Police Academy and directing the western Dollar for the Dead and action parody Loaded Weapon 1, both starring Emilio Estevez.

== Career ==
=== 3-D Films ===
Quintano was a Xerox salesman who had his own office supply company and was interested in getting into filmmaking. He was partners in a publishing firm with Tony Anthony, a filmmaker who had made a number of Spaghetti Westerns. Looking for an angle they decided to make a film in 3-D, believing many younger film goers would not be familiar with it. It resulted in Comin' at Ya!. Quintano and his partners worked for four years on the film, experimenting and testing the technology. They raised money to make the films, shot it in Spain and Rome, and sold it to Filmways.

Quintano was a writer and producer on the film. He also starred in the film "mostly as a matter of economics." The film was a surprise success at the box office, leading to a brief revival of 3-D films.

Quintano wanted to follow it with a Topkapi-type film about people stealing an item on an island. This became Treasure of the Four Crowns (1983). Quintano helped provide the story and produced, as well as appearing in the cast. The film was a box office disappointment.

=== Screenwriter ===
Treasure had been distributed by Cannon Films, and Quintano wrote a series of films for that company, including the comedy Making the Grade (1984) and the adventure films King Solomon's Mines (1985) and Allan Quatermain and the Lost City of Gold (1986).

He wrote Police Academy 3: Back in Training (1986) and Police Academy 4: Citizens on Patrol (1987).

=== Director ===
Quintano turned director with a TV movie For Better or for Worse (1989) a.k.a. Honeymoon Academy.

He followed it with Why Me? (1990) and Loaded Weapon 1 (1993). He did an uncredited rewrite on Cop and a Half (1993).

He was meant to write and direct a western for TNT, Scratch. He sold a script to Cinergi called Beauty for $500,000 as a vehicle for Bruce Willis. He also wrote films for Jean-Claude Van Damme (Quest) and John Candy (Our Father) and worked on a big screen adaptation of the comic Spy vs Spy. None of these films were made.

Quintano was a writer only on Operation Dumbo Drop (1995) and Sudden Death (1995) (originally called Arena).

He wrote and directed Dollar for the Dead (1998) and wrote The Long Kill (1999). Both were westerns.

In 2001, Quintano wrote a kung-fu reimagining of The Three Musketeers for director Peter Hyams. The Musketeer was a critical and commercial failure.

He wrote a TV movie Confessions of an Ugly Stepsister (2002).

His last credit was on the family feature Funky Monkey, which ended up being released straight-to-video, despite its $30 million budget.

== Filmography ==
| Year | Title | Director | Writer | Producer | Notes |
|---|---|---|---|---|---|
| 1981 | Comin' at Ya! | | Yes | Executive | Role: Pike Thompson |
| 1983 | Treasure of the Four Crowns | | Story | Yes | Role: Edmond |
| 1984 | Making the Grade | | Yes | Yes | |
| 1985 | King Solomon's Mines | | Yes | | |
| 1986 | Police Academy 3: Back in Training | | Yes | | |
| 1986 | Allan Quatermain and the Lost City of Gold | | Yes | | |
| 1987 | Police Academy 4: Citizens on Patrol | | Yes | | |
| 1990 | Honeymoon Academy | Yes | Yes | | Direct-to-video |
| 1990 | Why Me? | Yes | | | |
| 1993 | Loaded Weapon 1 | Yes | Yes | | |
| 1995 | Operation Dumbo Drop | | Yes | | |
| 1995 | Sudden Death | | Yes | | |
| 1998 | Dollar for the Dead | Yes | Yes | | TV movie |
| 1999 | Outlaw Justice | | Yes | | TV movie |
| 2001 | The Musketeer | | Yes | | |
| 2004 | Funky Monkey | | Yes | | Second unit director: France |

TV writer

| Year | Title | Notes |
|---|---|---|
| 2002 | The Wonderful World of Disney | Episode "Confessions of an Ugly Stepsister" |
