= The Silent Stranger =

1968 film by Vance Lewis

- Theatrical release poster
- Directed by: Vance Lewis
- Screenplay by: Vincenzo Cerami; Giancarlo Ferrando
- Story by: Tony Anthony
- Produced by: Tony Anthony; Allen Klein
- Starring: Tony Anthony; Lloyd Battista
- Cinematography: Mario Capriotti
- Edited by: Renzo Lucidi
- Music by: Stelvio Cipriani
- Production companies: Metro-Goldwyn-Mayer; ABKCO Industries
- Distributed by: United Artists
- Release date: 20 June 1975
- Running time: 92 minutes
- Countries: Italy; United States; Japan
- Languages: Italian; English; Japanese
- Budget: $1,600,000

The Silent Stranger (Italian: Lo straniero di silenzio), also known as The Horseman and the Samurai and The Stranger in Japan, is a 1968 Spaghetti Western jidaigeki film directed by Luigi Vanzi. It is the second sequel to A Stranger in Town, with twenty minutes excised for its 1975 release. The film is the third in a series of four western films starring Tony Anthony as "The Stranger". Despite being produced in 1968 for MGM, the film was never given an official release until 1975, nearly a decade after the previous film in the series. Tony Anthony stated that he believed the film became the victim of a power struggle at MGM, and the film was re-edited when it was later released by a different studio.

== Plot ==
The protagonist, an American cowboy in Edo-period 19th-Century Japan, becomes trapped in the middle of the strife between two feuding aristocratic Japanese families. The cowboy possesses a priceless scroll, acquired by chance while he was in Alaska, which both warring families want. Violent fighting ensues, involving Samurai swords, a Gatling gun, and a makeshift single-shot blunderbuss. In the end the cowboy returns the scroll (worth "one million dollars") to The Princess, a member of the family who are the rightful owners.

== Cast ==
- Tony Anthony as The Stranger
- Lloyd Battista as The American
- Kin Ōmae as Lord Motori
- Kanji Ohara as Koeta
- Kita Maura as Princess Otaka
- Kyōichi Satō as Koeta's Henchman
- Yoshio Nukano as Motori Samurai
- Raf Baldassarre as White-Eye (uncredited)
- Gaetano Scala as Thief in Klondike (uncredited)
- William Conroy as Thief in Klondike (uncredited)

== Reception ==
Paul Mavis, of DVDTalk, reviewing the 2015 Warner Archive Collection DVD release of The Stranger Collection, wrote, "While they're not in the league of Leone (what is?), Anthony's grimy, sneaky little punk killer is an intriguing addition to the genre. Tony Anthony did some very interesting things with the spaghetti Western genre, including, perhaps, presaging the Trinity movies, while certainly "inventing" the West-meets-East subgenre".
