= Loaded Weapon 1 =

1993 parody comedy film directed by Gene Quintano

- Theatrical release poster
- Directed by: Gene Quintano
- Screenplay by: Don Holley; Gene Quintano
- Story by: Don Holley; Tori Tellem
- Produced by: Suzanne Todd; David Willis
- Starring: Emilio Estevez; Samuel L. Jackson; Jon Lovitz; Tim Curry; Kathy Ireland; William Shatner
- Cinematography: Peter Deming
- Edited by: Christopher Greenbury
- Music by: Robert Folk
- Production companies: 3 Arts Entertainment; Goodman Rosen Productions
- Distributed by: New Line Cinema
- Release date: February 5, 1993
- Running time: 83 minutes
- Country: United States
- Language: English
- Budget: $8.2 million
- Box office: $51 million

National Lampoon's Loaded Weapon 1 (also known simply as Loaded Weapon 1) is a 1993 American parody film directed and co-written by Gene Quintano, and starring Emilio Estevez, Samuel L. Jackson, Kathy Ireland, Frank McRae, Tim Curry and William Shatner. The film mainly spoofs the first three Lethal Weapon films, as well as several others including Basic Instinct, Commando, Die Hard, Dirty Harry, Rambo, The Silence of the Lambs, Wayne's World, 48 Hrs. and TV series such as CHiPs.

Loaded Weapon 1 was released on February 5, 1993 to negative reviews but was a financial success with a gross of $51 million worldwide against a budget of $8 million.

== Plot ==
In Los Angeles, a man known as Mr. Jigsaw murders Billie York because she possesses a microfilm containing a recipe that can turn cocaine into cookies. Her former partner, Wes Luger, who is about to retire, is assigned the case by the reluctant captain Doyle, who dismisses it as a suicide but gives Luger the case. The catch is that Luger will have to be partnered with Jack Colt, a burned out cop who recently lost his dog, Claire. The two visit Harold Leacher, who tells them that Colt's former general in the Vietnam War, Mortars, is heading the operation. Meanwhile, Jigsaw and Mortars visit Mike McCraken, whom Jigsaw murders for losing the microfilm.

After finding the body, Colt and Luger go to Rick Becker, who claims that he laundered money with York (the money actually being in the laundry machine), but Rick is shot multiple times by unknown assailants, forcing Colt and Luger to go to the Wilderness Girls factory. The head, Destiny Demeanor, claims no knowledge of the operation during questioning, but she is revealed to be working for Mortars and his gang. Colt meets Luger's family, but he runs away when they try to seduce him. Destiny and Colt hang out at Colt's house, while Mortars sends a helicopter to destroy Colt's house (a trailer that is actually a mansion inside), but they accidentally destroy John McClane's house.

Due to lack of evidence, Doyle dismisses the case, but Colt still decides to stop the operation, much to the dismay of Luger. Luger is a by-the-book cop, after he took an unscheduled break from his crossing guard duties (as a child), which led to an old lady being run over by a car and killed. Colt breaks in and Destiny, now having fallen in love with Colt, attempts to stop Mortars, but Mortars shows that he was the one who kidnapped Claire, revealing Rick and Claire chained to a wall (Rick actually having survived the incident). Mortars shoots Destiny, who clings to life long enough to confess her feelings for Colt. Colt manages to catch up with Mortars, but then Luger shows up, having considered what Colt said to him earlier. He shoots and kills Mortars, and Colt kills Jigsaw, but starts a fire that destroys the whole factory. Doyle shows up, and asks Luger to stay in the force. Luger agrees, but as long as Colt is his partner. In the end, Destiny, having survived, shows up with Rick and Claire, and the team dances to "Bohemian Rhapsody".

== Cast ==
- Emilio Estevez as Sgt. Jack Colt, a parody of Martin Riggs
- Samuel L. Jackson as Sgt. Wes Luger, a parody of Roger Murtaugh
- Kathy Ireland as Miss Destiny Demeanor, a composite parody of Rika Van Den Haas and Catherine Tramell
  - Allyce Beasley as Miss Destiny Demeanor, before she lets her hair down and takes off her glasses
- Frank McRae as Captain Doyle, a parody mainly of his character from 48 Hrs.
- Tim Curry as Mr. Jigsaw, a parody mainly of Mr. Joshua
- William Shatner as General Curtis Mortars, a parody of General McAllister
- Jon Lovitz as Rick Becker, a parody of Leo Getz
- Lance Kinsey as Irv
- Denis Leary as Mike McCracken
- F. Murray Abraham as Dr. Harold Leacher, a parody of Hannibal Lecter
- Danielle Nicolet as Debbie Luger
- Beverly Johnson as Doris Luger
- Ken Ober as Dooley
- Vito Scotti as Tailor
- Bill Nunn as Police photographer
- Lin Shaye as Witness

=== Cameos ===
- James Doohan as Scotty
- Erik Estrada as Francis Poncherello, parodying his role from CHiPs
- Larry Wilcox as Jon Baker, parodying his role from CHiPs
- Corey Feldman as young cop
- Whoopi Goldberg (uncredited) as Billie York
- Paul Gleason as FBI agent
- Phil Hartman as Officer Davis
- Richard Moll as Prison attendant
- J. T. Walsh as Desk Clerk
- Rick Ducommun as D.A. #1
- Bruce Mahler (uncredited) as D.A. #2
- Robert Shaye (uncredited) as Interrogation Room Person
- Charles Napier and Charles Cyphers as Interrogators
- Bruce Willis (uncredited) as John McClane
- Denise Richards as Cindy
- Joyce Brothers as Medical Examiner
- Christopher Lambert (deleted scene) as Man with car-phone
- Charlie Sheen as Gern, Parking valet

== Release ==
=== Box office ===
Loaded Weapon 1 opened at number 1 at the US box office and grossed almost $28 million in the United States and Canada in total. Internationally, it grossed $23.2 million for a worldwide total of $51.2 million. The movie, along with Excessive Force and Three of Hearts, was cited for its contribution to New Line's record pre-sales in 1992 totaling $91.2 million.

=== Critical reception ===
The film received mostly negative reviews. Owen Gleiberman of Entertainment Weekly gave the film a C, comparing it negatively to the Zucker, Abrahams and Zucker films, while also noting that "the Lethal Weapon films, with their hyperbolic explosiveness, lurid repartee, and quasi-loco Mel Gibson hero, are already winking at the audience. (Last year's spoofy, ragtag Lethal Weapon 3 practically turned its own slovenliness into a running gag.) The only way to make light of them is to exaggerate the cartoon funkiness that's already at the center of their appeal. It's no wonder this Weapon ends up shooting blanks." Lawrence Cohn of Variety opened his review by saying "More an imitation than a parody, this would-be comedy is very short on laughs." Roger Ebert of The Chicago Sun-Times said the film's main failure was that the Lethal Weapon movies already contained sly spoofs of the police film genre: "The send-up doesn't feel much different than the real thing". On At the Movies, Ebert's colleague Gene Siskel said he "had some smiles at this material but no big laughs," saying the film seemed like a "quickie, slapdash production," and compared it negatively to the work of the Zucker, Abrahams and Zucker. Both critics gave the film a "thumbs down."

Clifford Terry had a more mixed review of the film; in the Chicago Tribune he remarked that "the salt-and-pepper protagonists are no-nonsense, rapid-firing cops down to their very names: Colt and Luger. Obviously, National Lampoon's Loaded Weapon I is designed as a sendup of the Lethal Weapon movies, but the benchmarks are really Police Academy and The Naked Gun. Once again, criminal activity is the game but sophomoric silliness and tastelessness call the shots."

Loaded Weapon 1 has a 21% score on the film-critic aggregator Rotten Tomatoes, based on 34 reviews with the consensus: "Loaded Weapon 1 hits all the routine targets with soft squibs, yielding a tired parody that cycles through its laundry list of references with little comedic verve".
