= Come Together (film) =

- Directed by: Saul Swimmer; Uncredited: Tony Anthony
- Screenplay by: Saul Swimmer; Tony Anthony; Dennis Azzarella; Antoinette Light; Bruce Rubin; David Bienstock
- Produced by: Tony Anthony; Saul Swimmer
- Starring: Tony Anthony; Luciana Paluzzi; Rosemary Dexter
- Cinematography: Tonino Delli Colli
- Edited by: Franco Arcalli
- Music by: Stelvio Cipriani
- Production company: ABKCO Films
- Distributed by: Allied Artists
- Release date: 25 September 1971
- Running time: 90 minutes
- Countries: Italy; United States
- Languages: English; Italian

Come Together (stylized as Cometogether) is a 1971 Italian-American romantic drama road film directed by Saul Swimmer and starring Tony Anthony, Luciana Paluzzi, and Rosemary Dexter.

Filming began in June 1970 in New York. There was also filming in Italy.

== Premise ==
A Vietnam veteran works as a film stuntman in Italy and tries to find meaning to his life. He meets two girls.

== Cast ==
- Tony Anthony
- Luciana Paluzzi
- Rosemary Dexter
