= Max Alexander (comedian) =

American comedian (1953–2016)

- Born: Michael Drelich; August 20, 1953; U.S.
- Died: November 2, 2016 (aged 63); New York City, New York, U.S.

Comedy career
- Years active: 1983–2016
- Medium: Stand-up, film, television

Michael Drelich (August 20, 1953 – November 2, 2016), better known by the stage name Max Alexander, was an American stand-up comedian and actor who appeared numerous times on The Tonight Show Starring Johnny Carson.

== Biography ==
=== Career ===
Born on August 20, 1953 on the East Coast, he moved to Los Angeles in his late twenties. In addition to doing stand-up comedy, Alexander also began appearing in supporting appearances on many sitcoms (Full House) and other series (Matlock). Alexander's film credits include supporting roles with stars such as Tom Hanks, Steve Martin, Jim Carrey, and Jason Segel, in such films as Roxanne (1987), Punchline (1988), and Forgetting Sarah Marshall.

He also appeared in Comedy Central's Best of the Improv, Vol. 5 (2003) and Comedy Club Greats with Jerry Seinfeld (2007). In recent years Alexander was frequently in Las Vegas, performing his comedy alongside Tom Jones and others. He appeared in Paul Blart: Mall Cop 2 as the "Big Sticky Mess" trade show vendor. His last film was Trainwreck (2015). He entertained at the 1989 wedding of Ann-Margret's son Lars, in Las Vegas, He appeared on the Jerry Lewis MDA Telethon as well.

His stand-up routine focused primarily on his large size, frequently poking fun at his weight. He was known for pulling his pants up to his chest during routines.

=== Personal life ===
In 2008, Alexander was hospitalized with a kidney ailment and needed a transplant to survive. His brother Rabbi Moshe Drelich was the donor. A few weeks after his transplant, Alexander suffered a stroke.

Alexander died on November 2, 2016, from a form of throat cancer, at age 63.

== Filmography ==
Film
Year	Film	Role	Notes
1983	Treasure of the Haunted House	Melvin	
1984	Garbo Talks	Roger Kellerman	Credited as Maxwell Alexander
1987	Roxanne	Dean	
1988	Punchline	Mister Ball	
1990	Honeymoon Academy	Sack	Alternative title: For Better or For Worse
1992	Brain Donors	L.A. stage manager	Alternative title: Lame Ducks
1998	A Fare to Remember		
1999	Man on the Moon	Harrah's Booker	
2007	Stand Up	Leo Stein	
2008	Forgetting Sarah Marshall	Big Dracula Head	Credited as Maxwell Alexander
2015	Paul Blart: Mall Cop 2	Security Rep ("Big Sticky Mess")	Uncredited in film, credited as Max Drelich in SOTA: Trade Show featurette
2015	Trainwreck	Max the Wheelchair Orderly	
Television
Year	Title	Role	Notes
1989	Full House	Dr. Wynager	1 episode
1990	Out of This World	Older Billy	1 episode
1992	Matlock	Max Sugarman	1 episode
1993	Doogie Howser, M.D.	Louis	1 episode
1994	Hart to Hart: Crimes of the Hart	Waiter	Television movie
1996	Pearl	Professor Millhouse	1 episode
1997	The Practice	Benjamin Holsten	2 episodes
1998	Hang Time		1 episode
2002	My Wife and Kids	Bartender	2 episodes
