= Honeymoon Academy =

- VHS cover
- Directed by: Gene Quintano
- Screenplay by: Gene Quintano; Jerry Lazarus
- Story by: Gene Quintano
- Produced by: Tony Anthony; Paul Maslansky
- Starring: Kim Cattrall; Robert Hays
- Cinematography: Peter Cabrera
- Edited by: Hubert de la Bouillerie
- Music by: Robert Folk
- Production company: Trans World Entertainment
- Distributed by: Triumph Releasing Corporation
- Release date: May 11, 1990 (U.S.)
- Country: United States
- Language: English
- Budget: $5 million

Honeymoon Academy (also titled For Better or for Worse) is a 1989 American adventure comedy film directed by Gene Quintano, starring Robert Hays and Kim Cattrall. During their honeymoon, a secret agent (Cattrall) and her new husband (Hays) become entangled in a plot to recover plates for counterfeiting U.S. currency. The film, described as a "would-be Romancing the Stone clone", has also been noted for its Hitchcock references. It released on May 11, 1990, to poor reviews.

== Plot ==
Chris and Sean meet by chance when the latter thwarts a strange attack on the former at a public library. This leads to a whirlwind romance between the two and soon, a marriage. But Sean does not suspect that his new bride, whom he believes to be a simple travel agent, is in fact a spy working for the U.S. government. Chris' superior Tina gifts a pair of plane tickets to Madrid to her for her honeymoon. But when the couple arrives at their destination airport, Chris is separated from Sean and summoned to her colleague Alex Desbains.

Desbains asks to help dismantle a money counterfeiting ring located in the country. The operation is headed by a notorious criminal named Lazos, who is looking to sell flawless $100 bill plates that could destroy the U.S economy. Chris is believed to be the only agent with a solid enough reputation to secure an in-person meeting with the kingpin. After some coaxing, she accepts to go through with the operation, all the while hiding the true nature of her activities to her husband. But as they commute to their hotel, the couple is already under surveillance from some suspicious men.

== Cast ==
- Kim Cattrall as Chris
- Robert Hays as Sean
- Max Alexander as Sack
- Jonathan Banks as Pitt
- Gordon Jump as Mr. Nelson
- Lance Kinsey as Lance
- Jerry Lazarus as Marls
- Christopher Lee as Lazos
- Doris Roberts as Mrs. Nelson
- Charles Rocket as Alex Desbains
- Leigh Taylor-Young as Mrs. Kent
- Judy Toll as Tina

== Production ==
=== Development ===
The film was announced and filmed under the title For Better or for Worse, with Paul Reiser and Kim Cattrall in the leading roles. Many of the people involved had previously worked on Police Academy series for producer Paul Maslansky, while others returned from Gene Quintano's pre-Police Academy works, such as the Spanish-filmed adventure Treasure of the Four Crowns. It was Quintano's directorial debut. Argentina was considered as the main shooting location, before the production relocated to Spain. Quintano would maintain a long running association with Trans World Entertainment boss Moshe Diamant after this film.

=== Filming ===
The shoot was a troubled one, as two of the principal actors suffered serious injuries that impacted its schedule. After three weeks of filming, leading man Paul Reiser suffered a ruptured Achilles tendon. He was repatriated to New York for surgery on June 5, 1990, but rehabilitation required him to wear a cast for six weeks. As a result, he was told that he would have to be replaced, which he understood. Filming was suspended for two weeks and Robert Hays was flown in to take over the role. Co-star Jonathan Banks estimated that about 70 percent of the material shot until that point had to be remade. Banks suffered an injury of his own when he tore a calf muscle during filming of the action scene outside the cathedral. He had to wear a cast for several weeks as well. All in all, filming required $1 million in insurance payouts. As a result, the shoot dragged significantly, and photography extended from May to August 1988. The budget was $5 million. Christopher Lee mentioned that he and Cattrall worked on this film and The Return of the Musketeers—which was also lensed in Spain—at the same time.

While a few shots were captured in Washington, DC, the majority of scenes set there, such as those featuring Judy Toll at the fake travel agency, were actually filmed in Spain. In addition to the Spanish capital of Madrid, the town of Pedraza, located was 80 miles to the north, was also used. The bulk of the shoot, however, took place in the southeastern Province of Alicante. The city of Alicante itself is represented by Santa Bárbara Castle, a popular filming location. The neighboring coastal towns of Xàbia (including the surrounding plateau) and Dénia also appear. Dénia's Marinetta Cassiana beach was the backdrop for the film's finale, which required a bus to jump above the port, and into a fishing boat. According to an El País article, the film's British stunt team was reluctant to execute the stunt, which fell to French military veteran turned stuntman Alain Petit. Although the film's editing makes those numbers difficult to verify, Petit listed the jump as 110 meter in length and 35 meter in maximum height, claiming it was a record for a stunt of this type.

== Release ==
=== Pre-release ===
The film's domestic release was delayed multiple times. A profile of Cattral in The Toronto Star indicated that the film would be released in the spring of 1989. A Tribune News Service item then mentioned a late October 1989 date. A February 1990 UPI profile of Robert Hays indicated that the film—still referred to as For Better or for Worse—was due in March.

=== Theatrical ===
The film's U.S. theatrical release finally arrived on May 11, 1990, via Triumph Releasing. In an effort to tie it to the lucrative Police Academy franchise, the film was retitled Honeymoon Academy before release. As with many independent genre films at the time, the film was a touring regional release, debuting in Ohio before moving across different markets.

=== Home video ===
The film received its domestic VHS release through distributor HBO Video on December 12, 1990. In the U.K., the film premiered on VHS via Entertainment in Video on August 22, 1990. The film was also seen before its domestic bow in some foreign markets, such as Australia, where it premiered in the third week of December 1989 via First Release Home Entertainment. In those territories, it retained the title of For Better of for Worse.

== Reception ==
Honeymoon Academy was panned by most critics. Kevin Thomas of the Los Angeles Times dismissed it as "a stale, repetitive comedy-adventure" with "plenty of action but none of it [...] inspired or funny", and remarked that "even the splendid Spanish locales look glum." Malcolm Johnson of The Hartford Courant called it a "wearying, laughless comedy" and "a ludicrously inept directing debut" for Quintano. Joe Baltake of the Sacramento Bee lambasted the film as a "Honeymoon that never should have been", saddled with a "dated plot that plays like a Love, American Style reject". Chris Schaub of the Baltimore Sun was not amused either, writing that "as with [Police Academy], there's great emphasis on plot and little regard for logic, making for a lot of silliness most of it unfunny." He also speculated that the title change may have been because "worse is the term that comes to mind when watching this lame film." Joe Kane, resident genre reviewer for the New York Daily News, panned the film as "amazingly lame" and a "lackluster loser" reserved for "the most masochistic of hardcore [Christopher Lee] completists". He later chose it as his worst film of the year. Max McQueen of Cox News Service also wrote that "[t]his bargain-basement effort by Gene Quintano is in the running for the top spot on my worst-films-of-1990 list.

Barbara Vancheri of the Pittsburgh Post-Gazette was kinder than most, opining that "[i]n the grand scheme of movies, Honeymoon Academy is not really a bad film. It's just not very good. [...] It trips along harmlessly, providing a meager couple of laughs". She further noted that "[t]he romance never sizzles" and it "fails to build any tension". Perhaps due to the lower expectations associated with non-theatrical releases, the film picked up a few positive mentions during its straight-to-tape U.K. release. Kirby Weston of the Coventry Evening Telegraph called Hays and Cattrall "hilarious" and "an irresistible couple", while Bob Eborall of The Ealing Leader praised "an amusingly different little movie to enjoy."

=== Year-end lists ===
- Worst film of the year – Joe Kane (The Phantom of the Movies), New York Daily News
