= Raf Baldassarre =

Italian actor (1932–1995)

- Born: Raffaele Baldassarre; 17 January 1932; Giurdignano Lecce, Apulia, Italy
- Died: 11 January 1995 (aged 62); Rome, Italy
- Other names: Ralph Baldwin; Ralph Baldwyn
- Years active: 1958-1985

Raffaele "Raf" Baldassarre (17 January 1932 - 11 January 1995) was an Italian film actor.

== Life and career ==
Born Raffaele Baldassarre in Giurdignano, Lecce, Apulia, he started his career in the late 1950s, being cast in many peplum and adventure films, alternating between stereotypical roles of the young villain and the loyal friend of the protagonist. Following a fashion of the time for American-sounding stage names, in the second half of the 1960s he was credited "Ralph Baldwyn" or "Ralph Baldwin" in several Spaghetti Westerns. Baldassarre was active until mid-eighties, usually cast in supporting roles, and he occasionally also worked as a producer.

== Selected filmography ==
- Pirate of the Half Moon (1957) - Un corsaro
- The Pirate of the Black Hawk (1958) - Pirata Rosso
- Pia de' Tolomei (1958)
- The Nights of Lucretia Borgia (1959) - Ruggero
- The Night of the Great Attack (1959) - Young Pickpocket
- The Loves of Salammbo (1960) - Capo Mercenario
- Queen of the Pirates (1960)
- La regina dei tartari (1960) - Prigioniero di Tartari
- The Giants of Thessaly (1960) - Antinoo
- Slave of Rome (1961) - Lucio
- Spade senza bandiera (1961) - Man at Court (uncredited)
- Capitani di ventura (1961)
- Hercules and the Conquest of Atlantis (1961) - Capo delle guardie
- Sword of the Conqueror (1961) - Silvestro
- Queen of the Nile (1961) - Mareb
- Hercules in the Haunted World (1961) - Un mercenario
- Suleiman the Conqueror (1961) - Boris, Luogotenente
- Erik the Conqueror (1961) - Floki
- Ulysses Against the Son of Hercules (1962) - Prince Adrasto
- The Son of Captain Blood (1962) - Bruno
- The Secret Mark of D'Artagnan (1962) - Montfort
- Gladiator of Rome (1962) - Gladiator
- Attack of the Normans (1962) - Dag
- Shades of Zorro (1962) - Chinto
- The Sign of the Coyote (1963) - Lenny Henchman
- Implacable Three (1963) - Comisario Molero
- The Executioner of Venice (1963) - Messere Grimani
- José María (1963)
- Sandokan to the Rescue (1964) - Teotrokis the Greek
- A Fistful of Dollars (1964) - Juan De Dios (uncredited)
- The Seven from Texas (1964) - Jess
- Seven from Thebes (1964) - Leonidas
- Seven Hours of Gunfire (1965) - Guillermo
- Jesse James' Kid (1965) - Bruce
- Legacy of the Incas (1965) - Geronimo
- Our Man in Jamaica (1965) - Gil
- Hands of a Gunfighter (1965) - Mack
- Canadian Wilderness (1965) - Victor's Friend
- The Relentless Four (1965) - Moss
- Our Men in Bagdad (1966) - Dimitri
- El Rojo (1966) - Ramon
- A Stranger in Town (1967) - Corgo
- The Stranger Returns (1967) - Chrysler
- Dakota Joe (1967)
- Tutto per tutto (1968) - Miguel Comaco
- Luana la figlia della foresta vergine (1968)
- The Silent Stranger (1968) - White-Eye (uncredited)
- Man Who Cried for Revenge (1968) - Bandito
- OSS 117 – Double Agent (1968)
- Persecución hasta Valencia (1968)
- Pistol for a Hundred Coffins (1968) - Verdugo
- Giugno '44 - Sbarcheremo in Normandia (1968) - Parker
- Between God, the Devil and a Winchester (1968) - Batch
- The Great Silence (1968) - Sanchez
- Dead Men Don't Count (1968) - Gregory Lassiter
- The Mercenary (1968) - Mateo
- Tarzan in the Golden Grotto (1969)
- Quinto: non ammazzare (1969) - Stagecoach guard
- Tarzana, the Wild Girl (1969) - Fred
- Garringo (1969) - Damon
- I diavoli della guerra (1969) - The Sheik
- Arizona Colt Returns (1970) - Biggle
- Sartana Kills Them All (1970) - Fred Burton
- Hey Amigo! A Toast to Your Death (1970) - Manolo
- Dig Your Grave Friend... Sabata's Coming (1971) - Sabata
- Four Gunmen of the Holy Trinity (1971) - Dingus
- And the Crows Will Dig Your Grave (1971) - Sheriff of Silver Town
- Il ritorno del gladiatore più forte del mondo (1971) - The Fox
- Web of the Spider (1971) - Herbert
- Drummer of Vengeance (1971) - Jason
- Blindman (1971) - Mexican General
- Prey of Vultures (1972) - Joe Porter, Blacksmith
- They Believed He Was No Saint (1972) - Director de la prisión
- Zambo, il dominatore della foresta (1972) - Juanez
- 1931: Once Upon a Time in New York (1973) - Raf - Pole's Henchman (uncredited)
- The Killer with a Thousand Eyes (1973) - Olalia
- Zinksärge für die Goldjungen (1973) - Sergio
- Dagli archivi della polizia criminale (1973) - Hastruan's henchman (uncredited)
- Cugini carnali (1974)
- The Killer Wore Gloves (1974) - Man at Subway Station (uncredited)
- Eyeball (1975) - Martinez - the tour guide
- Get Mean (1975) - Diego
- Geometra Prinetti selvaggiamente Osvaldo (1976)
- Le seminariste (1976) - Il prefetto
- Safari Express (1976)
- Piccole labbra (1978)
- Improvviso (1979) - L'infermiere Antonio
- Pensieri Morbosi (1980) - History Professor
- La moglie in bianco... l'amante al pepe (1981) - Cosmo
- Fantasma d'amore (1981) - Luciano
- La dottoressa preferisce i marinai (1981) - The tanning Man
- Thor the Conqueror (1983) - Gnut
- Hercules (1983) - Sostratos
- The Adventures of Hercules (1985) - Atreus (final film role)
