= Il prezzo dell'onore =

1953 film

Il Prezzo dell'onore
- Directed by: Ferdinando Baldi
- Cinematography: Corrado Pintaldi
- Release date: 8 January 1953
- Country: Italy
- Language: Italian

Il Prezzo dell'onore is a 1953 Italian melodrama film directed by Ferdinando Baldi.

== Cast ==
- Maria Frau as Maria
- Mario Vitale as Antonio
- Vincenzo Musolino as Francesco
- Mino Doro as Don Nicola
- Armando Guarnieri as Michele
- Amedeo Trilli as Minutolo
- Giovanna Ralli
