= Get Mean =

1975 film

- US film poster
- Directed by: Ferdinando Baldi
- Screenplay by: Wolfe Lowenthal; Lloyd Battista
- Story by: Tony Anthony
- Produced by: Tony Anthony
- Starring: Tony Anthony; Lloyd Battista
- Cinematography: Mario Perino
- Edited by: Toni Manfredi
- Music by: Franco Bixio; Fabio Frizzi; Vince Tempera
- Production company: Strange Films
- Distributed by: Cee Note
- Release date: 21 December 1975
- Running time: 90 minutes
- Countries: Italy; United States
- Languages: English; Italian

Get Mean, also known as Beat a Dead Horse, Vengeance of the Barbarians and The Stranger Gets Mean, is a 1975 Italian-American Spaghetti Western film directed by Ferdinando Baldi and starring Tony Anthony, Lloyd Battista, Raf Baldassarre, Diana Lorys and Mirta Miller. It is the final sequel to A Stranger in Town, with Anthony reprising the role of "The Stranger."

The film was released to little acclaim and never received a physical release on the home video market until 2015, when it was released by Blue Underground on remastered Blu-ray and DVD.

== Plot ==
The film begins as The Stranger is dragged into a ghost town by his horse, who dies upon entering the town. In the town is a family of gypsies and a fortune teller, who offers the Stranger $50,000 to return Princess Elizabeth Maria de Burgos to Spain, where her nation is being attacked by Barbarians. The Stranger turns down their request, before their home is ransacked by a troop of Barbarians. The Stranger beats them to save his money, and agrees to take Princess Elizabeth to Spain.

Upon arriving in Spain, The Princess and The Stranger wind up in the middle of a battle between the allied Moors, and the invading Barbarians. The Barbarians defeat the Moors, and capture The Stranger and The Princess. The Stranger defuses the situation by convincing the Barbarian leader, Diego that the woman he is traveling with is not actually a princess, but a woman who's gone mad after falling off a horse and hitting her head. The Barbarians do not believe his story, and tie up The Stranger by his feet, with the Princess being taken away on horseback. The Stranger, left swinging from his feet, loudly proclaims that he won't leave the country until he gets his money, before being fired on from a Barbarian cannon.

The Barbarians travel back to the conquered castle, where they give thanks to Rodrigo's stallion, while The Stranger is rescued by Morelia, a member of the Spanish resistance. Morelia takes The Stranger back to see the Princess's general, a dying old man. The Stranger demands his $50,000 he was promised, but Morelia insists that there's no way to pay him until they are able to retake their family's treasure from the castle. The General states that The Princess is the only one who can claim the treasure, before saying the name of a temple in the mountains, and dying. The Barbarians raid the town where The Stranger and the rebels are hiding, before The Stranger scares them away, shooting them on horseback and hanging the survivors by their feet over the side of the village walls.

The Stranger then rides to the castle to meet with the leader of The Barbarians to negotiate for the treasure. The Stranger offers him worthless baubles such as beads and mirrors, claiming they're treasures from America. The Barbarian leader is insulted by this, and rampages, smashing his throne room and attempting to kill The Stranger. The Stranger attempts to trade The Princess for the location of the treasure, and begins negotiations with a hunchbacked royal by the name of Sombra, but who The Stranger calls 'Richard' after Shakespeare's Richard III. Sombra attempts to negotiate with The Stranger by offering him women, but The Stranger states he needs The Princess in order to claim the treasure. He frees The Princess from the Rack, and the three ride to the mountain temple.

A priest claims that The Princess will not be able to claim Rodrigo's treasure until she passes 'The Trials of Death.' The Stranger insists upon going in her stead, and upon riding to the temple where the trials take place, he is accosted by a magical force, and greeted with the decaying skeletons of the men who have failed the trial before him. The trial's magic turns The Stranger into a black man, and faces him off against a bull, before transporting him to the temple with his treasure. The Barbarians discover The Stranger harbors a cursed amulet called 'The Scorpion's Sting,' which spells death to whoever wears it. The Barbarians force The Stranger to wear it, before discovering that none of them have the treasure.

The Barbarians prepare The Stranger for a human sacrifice in memory of Rodrigo, as Morelia engages in a duel with Sombra after she refuses to tell him the location of the treasure. Sombra impales Morelia with his sword, and the Barbarians prepare to roast The Stranger on a spit over an open fire, torturing him until The Stranger tells them where the treasure is. The councilor, Alfonso, attempts to rescue The Stranger in exchange for the treasure, going behind the back of the Barbarian guard to do so. The Stranger leads Alfonso away, as he claims he's the biggest liar anyone's ever met. The Stranger threatens Alfonso with the Scorpion's Sting, and gets him to swallow a message within a ball of wax in order to deliver it back to The Barbarians. Meanwhile, The Stranger prepares for battle, loading himself with dynamite and a quadruple-barreled shotgun.

The Barbarians find The Scorpion's Sting encased in the ball of wax, and are prepared for his arrival by capturing The Stranger. The Barbarian women attempt to couple with The Stranger, as he slips away, only to be challenged by Alfonso to a duel. The Stranger traps Alfonso with the sex-crazed Barbarian women, before reconvening with The Princess, and launching dynamite-tipped arrows onto the Barbarian horde. The Barbarians prepare for battle, only to discover lit fuses trailing the castle leading to The Stranger.

The Barbarian chief is held at gunpoint by The Stranger, as he pours live scorpions into his armor. The Barbarian leader writhes in agony, as The Stranger disembowels him with his quadruple-barreled shotgun. Sombra hears The Stranger call for 'Richard' and begins firing his cannon into the darkness. The Stranger give Sombra until sunrise to leave the country, as Sombra accidentally shoots the wall hiding Rodrigo's Treasure. Sombra sends Alfonso to look for The Stranger in a thatch roofed building, before setting it on fire to kill him. The Stranger reveals himself behind Sombra as the castle explodes behind him.

The Stranger rescues The Princess as she embraces him, leaving to wait for The Stranger inside, as he faces Sombra. Sombra breaks his leg and pleads for The Stranger to let him go, begging him to give him a chance. The Stranger challenges Sombra to a duel, his cannon against his shotgun. Sombra fires his cannons, but misses every shot, as he quotes Richard III's famous line, lamenting his kingdom for a horse. The Stranger kills Sombra, after riding into the Spanish mountains, and traveling back to America.

== Production ==
Producer and Actor Tony Anthony had made the decision to shake up his character after not being sure where else to go with them by putting them in a strange land, noting that it had to be "off the wall" to not only surprise people, but to fit with his character. Putting The Stranger out of his element, having him only be driven by money would fit his motivations and interests well. Anthony was also concerned with Spaghetti Westerns becoming stale and audiences no longer taking interest in them. Anthony stated that he wasn't at all interested in historical accuracy, and just wanted to put The Stranger in a strange land, choosing old Spain.

Co-writer and Actor Lloyd Battista convinced Anthony to let him play a hunchback in the style of King Richard, due to Battista's love of the character, and the writings of Shakespeare.

Director Ferdinando Baldi used his previous experience as a college professor with an expertise in famous battles to shoot the battle between the Barbarians and the Moors. Previously, Baldi had worked on Ben Hur, directing action sequences within the film. Due to budget restraints, the battle scenes were shot using the same horses and the same actors, changing costumes in between takes.

Anthony was able to start filming with $50,000 of his own money, eventually taking a loan of another $50,000 from Baldi to finance the film.

Get Mean was filmed on location in Spain in the spring of 1975, with the western ghost town being shot at Mini Hollywood. The castle used for the film was Alcazaba of Almería, in southern Spain, and the site of the Trials of Death was shot in the Royal Site of San Lorenzo de El Escorial.

Despite being shot in, and heavily featuring the country of Spain, the film was never theatrically released there. The film was released in 1975 in the United States by Cee Note, and released in the United Kingdom in 1978 by Ember Films, under the title Vengeance of the Barbarians. The film's theatrical cut was several minutes shorter, and cut against Tony Anthony's wishes. The Blu-ray release from Blue Underground restores the cut footage, and offers the film as a restored director's cut.

The film's theatrical run grossed $10 million, and Anthony, as the producer of the film, had plans to take his "Stranger" character to other locales around the world, with the hopes of filming in places China and Africa, creating a successful franchise. Get Mean became the final film featuring The Stranger.

== Cast ==
- Tony Anthony – The Stranger
- Lloyd Battista – Sombra
- Raf Baldassarre – Diego
- David Dreyer – Alfonso
- Diana Loris – Princess Elizabeth Maria de Burgos
- Mirta Miller – Morelia
- Sherman "Big Train" Bergman – Barbarian (uncredited)
- Raul Castro – Gypsy in Tavern (uncredited)
- Remo De Angelis – Barbarian in Tavern (uncredited)
- George Rigaud – Emir, Moorish General (uncredited)
