= Ferdinando Baldi =

Italian film director and screenwriter (1917–2007)

- Born: Ferdinando Baldi; 19 May 1927; Cava de' Tirreni, Salerno, Italy
- Died: 12 November 2007 (aged 80); Rome, Italy
- Occupations: Director, screenwriter

Ferdinando Baldi (19 May 1927 – 12 November 2007) was an Italian film director and screenwriter. Throughout his career he used a number of pseudonyms, including Ted Kaplan, Ferdy Baldwin and Sam Livingstone.

== Biography ==
Baldi was born in Cava de' Tirreni, Salerno, on 19 May 1927. He was employed as a teacher after getting a degree in literature, but he got involved in cinema thanks to his acquaintance with Italian producer Tiziano Longo and he produced his first movie, Il Prezzo dell'onore in 1952.

== Selected filmography ==
Year	Title	Director	Writer	Notes	Ref.
1952	Il prezzo dell'onore	Yes	Yes	Written with G. Folchi and T. Piacenti	
1954	Assi alla ribalta	Yes	Yes	Directed with Giorgio Cristallini	
1960	David and Goliath	Yes	Yes	Starring Orson Welles, Co-directors Richard Pottier and Orson Welles; Co-writers, Umberto Scarpelli and Ambrogio Molteni	
1961	Duel of Champions	Yes	No	Co-directing with Terence Young	
1961	The Tartars	Yes	No	un-credited in English version, Co-directing with Orson Welles and Richard Thorpe	
1962	The Sword of El Cid	No	Yes	Co-writing with Alfredo Giannetti and Antonio Navarro Linares	
1962	Taras Bulba, the Cossack	Yes	No	Co-directing with Henry Zaphiratos	
1963	Kingdom of Violence	Yes	Yes	Co-writing with Adriano Bolzoni and Andres Dolera	
1964	Il figlio di Cleopatra	Yes	Yes	Co-writing with Anacleto Fontini and Franco Airaldi	
1966	Suicide Mission to Singapore	Yes	Yes	Co-writing with Maria del Carmen Martinez Roman	
1966	In the Shadow of the Eagles	Yes	Yes	Credited as Ferdy Baldwin, Co-writing with Nino Milano,	
1966	Texas, Adios	Yes	Yes	Co-writing with Franco Rossetti, Starring Franco Nero	
1967	Massacre in the Black Forest	Yes	Yes	Co-directing with Rudolf Nussgruber, Co-writing with Adriano Bolzoni and Alessandro Ferraù	
1967	Io non protesto, io amo	Yes	Yes	Co-writing with Franco Rossetti	
1967	Rita of the West	Yes	Yes	Co-writing with Franco Rossetti, Starring Rita Pavone, Terence Hill and Lucio Dalla	
1968	Hate Thy Neighbor	Yes	Yes	Co-writing with Luigi Angelo and Roberto Natale	
1968	Django, Prepare a Coffin	Yes	Yes	Co-writing with Franco Rossetti, starring Terence Hill	
1969	The Forgotten Pistolero	Yes	No		
1969	Bootleggers	No	Yes	Co-writing with Alfio Caltabiano, Jose Gutierrez Maesso and Leonardo Martin	
1971	Blindman	Yes	No	Starring Ringo Starr	
1971	Los corsarios	Yes	No		
1972	The Sicilian Connection	Yes	Yes	Co-writing with Duilio Coletti	
1973	Long Lasting Days	Yes	Yes	Credited as Sam Livingstone	
1974	Carambola!	Yes	Yes	Co-writing with Nino Ducci and Horst Frank	
1975	Carambola's Philosophy: In the Right Pocket	Yes	Yes	Co-writing with Nino Ducci and Mino Roli	
1976	Smooth Velvet, Raw Silk	Yes	Yes	Co-writing with Brunello Rondi	
1976	Get Mean	Yes	No		
1976	Geometra Primetti selvaggiamente Osvaldo	Yes	Yes	Co-writing with Luigi Bernardi and Romano Bernardi	
1977	Nine Guests for a Crime	Yes	No		
1980	Terror Express	Yes	No		
1980	La compagna di viaggio	Yes	Yes		
1981	Comin' at Ya!	Yes	No		
1983	Treasure of the Four Crowns	Yes	No		
1985	Warbus	Yes	Yes	Credited as Ted Kaplan, Co-writing with John Fitzsimmons	
1988	Un maledetto soldato	Yes	Yes	Credited as Ted Kaplan	
1988	Ten Zan: The Ultimate Mission	Yes	Yes	Credited as Ted Kaplan, filmed in North Korea	
2005	The Spaghetti Western	No	No	Documentary Interview	
2005	The Western World of Ferdinando Baldi	No	No	Documentary Interview	
