= Peter Bennett (music promoter) =

- Born: Pietro Benedetto; May 10, 1935 the Bronx, New York
- Died: November 22, 2012 (aged 77)
- Occupation: music promoter

Peter Bennett (May 10, 1935 – November 22, 2012) was a popular music promoter who worked with several prominent artists including the Beatles, the Rolling Stones, Elvis Presley, Bob Dylan, Frank Sinatra and the Jackson 5.

Peter Bennett was born as Pietro Benedetto in the Bronx, New York. As a distant cousin to singer Tony Bennett, Peter changed his last name in the early 1950s as his famous relation had. Peter and Tony both knew they had family from a similar Italian locale and remained close through the music business. Pete Bennett first entered the entertainment world as a drummer. In 1956 he sat in with trombonist and big bandleader Tommy Dorsey at New York's Paramount Theater. This was an historic engagement, as a reunion of Dorsey and his former boy singer of the early 1940s, Frank Sinatra. Bennett made his television debut in 1961 performing on drums his first single, "Fever", with his group Pete Bennett and the Embers on ABC-TV's Dick Clark's American Bandstand. His behind-the-scenes work helping singer Bobby Vinton plug his early 1962 recordings for Epic Records first introduced Bennett to the world of music promotion. During the summer of 1962, Bennett's efforts successfully pushed Nat King Cole's Capitol Records single "Ramblin' Rose" into the top 10, a return for Nat after four years.

In 1963 Bennett began a long-standing business relationship with accountant, turned personal manager Allen Klein. Klein at the time held exclusive representation of soul and R&B legend Sam Cooke. Bennett assisted in Cooke's return to the top 10 by promoting classics such as "Another Saturday Night" and "Shake". In 1964 Klein and Bennett found themselves at the center of the British Invasion. Following the American release of the Beatles' second LP, With the Beatles, and its unprecedented success, Klein arranged business deals to handle the stateside affairs of other leading UK groups, including the Rolling Stones, the Animals and Herman's Hermits. It fell on Bennett to persuade disc jockeys coast to coast to break songs such as "(I Can't Get No) Satisfaction", "The House of the Rising Sun" and "I'm Henry VIII, I Am" into nationwide number one hits. Bennett believed that the B-side of the Stones' "Satisfaction" single, "The Under Assistant West Coast Promotion Man", was an ode to himself.

Sinatra sought Bennett's assistance in making his 1966 Reprise Records release "Strangers in the Night" his first chart topper in eleven years. Bennett also found his services requested by Elvis Presley. In 1969, at the end of a long career slump, Bennett helped push the single "Suspicious Minds" to number one – Presley's first in seven years. Bennett was a backstage guest at Presley's opening night comeback to the concert stage at the International Hotel in Las Vegas in July 1969. In 1970 singer and television personality Perry Como recorded "It's Impossible", a ballad he believed could break through the rock and soul wave that had kept him at the bottom for over a decade. Phone calls and a few back favors owed to Bennett helped give Como his first top 10 hit since 1958 with the song.

Following the death of Beatles manager Brian Epstein in August 1967, Bennett was hired as promotional manager for the Beatles and their organization Apple Corps. His first promotion work for the band was the 1968 debut single for Apple Records, "Hey Jude". It reached number one on the Billboard Hot 100 for nine weeks – the longest run at the top of the US charts for the entire 1960s. Bennett promoted all future Apple single and album releases in the US, including The Beatles (also known as the White Album), Yellow Submarine, Abbey Road and Let It Be. During that time, Klein became the Beatles' business manager and ran Apple under the aegis of his company ABKCO, for which Bennett served as promotions manager.

After the band's break-up in April 1970, Bennett continued to manage promotion for each of the four Beatles – John Lennon, Paul McCartney, George Harrison and Ringo Starr – within his role at ABKCO. He also handled promotion for the Beatles' original drummer, Pete Best, and numerous other stars. He was the promoter for the Concert for Bangladesh at New York's Madison Square Garden on August 1, 1971. The two-show charity event was organized by Harrison and featured Starr, Bob Dylan, Eric Clapton, Leon Russell, Ravi Shankar and Badfinger.

In 1975, with his EMI Records contract due to expire, Lennon asked Bennett to reach out to CBS head Walter Yetnikoff to see if the label was interested in the former Beatle coming on board. Before serious negotiations began, Lennon chose to take a career break. Michael Jackson heard of these discussions and asked Bennett if he could open a door to CBS for himself and his brothers. At that time, the Jacksons were becoming unhappy with their deal at Motown Records and needed a change. In 1976, through Bennett's help, the Jacksons signed with Epic, a subsidiary of CBS. Six years later, Bennett's experience was called upon again by Michael to promote his 1982 album Thriller, which became the biggest seller in music history.

In 1976, Klein and Bennett were each charged with three felony counts of attempted income tax evasion for 1970, 1971 and 1972, as well as related misdemeanor counts of making false statements on their income tax returns for those years. The IRS claimed that Klein and Bennett had sold promotional copies of Beatles and post-Beatles albums, including The Concert for Bangladesh, without declaring the sales on their tax returns. Having resigned from ABKCO in late 1975, Bennett, through his attorney Martin W. Schwartz of Yonkers and Mineola, negotiated a plea to a single misdemeanor charge and then became a key witness for the IRS in its case against Klein. He was sentenced to unsupervised probation for 1 year by U.S. District Judge Vincent Broderick. In 1977, Klein testified that he had not instructed Bennett to sell promotional copies of albums and that although he'd received cash payments from Bennett, the payments were a return of cash advances that Bennett had been given. In 1979, a jury found Klein innocent of the felony charges and convicted him of a single misdemeanor charge of making false statements on his 1972 tax return, for which he served two months in jail.

Bennett was referred to in Billboard magazine as the man who "made unknowns into stars and stars into superstars". He has the distinction of being the only promotions manager to work simultaneously with the Beatles, the Rolling Stones, Elvis Presley, Bob Dylan, Frank Sinatra and Tony Bennett. In the eighties he promoted concerts for comedy legends Bob Hope and George Burns. Burns once paid Bennett for his services by autographing hundreds of copies of his book "Gracie" following a performance in Orlando, Florida. Bennett later spoke of that experience: "It cost me more to ship those damn books back home to Connecticut than what he owed me!"

Bennett spoke at many music conventions and nostalgia shows, sharing his stories and fond memories with fans. In 2006 he began work on his autobiography, which remains unpublished. He hosted forums billed as "An Evening With Pete Bennett". Old friends such as former Moody Blues and Wings guitarist Denny Laine would appear as a featured speaker. In September 2007 he appeared at the first annual Orillia Beatles Festival to discuss his involvement with the Fab Four. In later years New Jersey songwriter and radio personality Jim Davison was represented by Bennett.

Bennett died of heart failure on November 22, 2012 at age 77.
