= Lloyd Battista =

American actor and screenwriter

Lloyd McAteer Battista (born May 14, 1937, in Cleveland, Ohio) is a retired American actor and screenwriter.

== Biography ==
Battista studied acting at the Carnegie Institute of Technology. He was active on Broadway and off-Broadway stages, appearing in productions of plays such as Sexual Perversity in Chicago and The Homecoming. His television roles ranged from the CBS soap opera Love of Life in the 1950s and the mini-series James A. Michener's Texas in 1994. He appeared in movies such as Chisum (1970), Love and Death (1975), and In Hell (2003).

He appeared in several Spaghetti Westerns including some with Tony Anthony that he wrote the screenplays for. Battista wrote the screenplay for Anthony's Treasure of the Four Crowns but did not appear in the film.

On the radio, Battista was heard between 1974 and 1982 on the CBS Radio Mystery Theater. He also wrote The Nose Knows, a guide to Los Angeles area restaurants.

== Filmography ==
Year	Title	Role	Notes
1964	Flipper's New Adventure	Gil	
1967	God Forgives... I Don't!	Cat Stevens	English version, Voice, uncredited
1968	Ace High	Cat Stevens	English version, Voice, uncredited
1968	The Silent Stranger	The American	
1969	Boot Hill	Cat Stevens	English version, Voice, uncredited
1969	Mission: Impossible	King Selim/Prince Samandal	Episode: "The Brothers"
1970	Mission: Impossible	Chief of Police Francisco Diaz	Episode: "Flight"
1970	Chisum	Neemo	
1970	The Virginian	Embry	season 9 episode 07 (Crooked corner)
1971	The Love Machine	Andy Parino	Uncredited
1971	Blindman	Domingo	
1972	Here's Lucy	Ronnie Cumberland	season 4 episode 24 (Kim Finally Cuts You-Know-Whose Apron String)
1975	Love and Death	Don Francisco	
1975	Get Mean	Sombra	
1983	Last Plane Out	Anastasio Somoza Debayle	
1991	Driving Me Crazy	Fiat Boss	
1992	Round Trip to Heaven	Mike	
1999	Bellyfruit	Mr. Vasquez	
2003	In Hell	General Hruschov	
2006	Mothers and Daughters	Art Gallery Guy	(final film role)
