= Treasure of the Four Crowns =

- US Theatrical release poser
- Directed by: Ferdinando Baldi
- Written by: Lloyd Battista; Jim Bryce; Jerry Lazarus
- Story by: Tony Pettito; Gene Quintano
- Produced by: Tony Anthony; Gene Quintano
- Starring: Tony Anthony; Ana Obregón; Gene Quintano; Francisco Rabal
- Cinematography: Marcello Masciocchi; Giuseppe Ruzzolini
- Edited by: Franco Fraticelli
- Music by: Ennio Morricone
- Production companies: The Lupo-Anthony-Quintano Company; M.T.G. Productions; Lotus Films
- Distributed by: Cannon Film Distributors (North America); Columbia Pictures (International)
- Release date: January 21, 1983
- Running time: 97 minutes
- Countries: Italy; Spain; United States
- Language: English
- Box office: $4.45 million

Treasure of the Four Crowns is a 1983 action adventure film directed by Ferdinando Baldi and starring Tony Anthony, Ana Obregón, Gene Quintano, and Francisco Rabal. Anthony and Quintano also served as producers and screenwriters. The musical score was composed by Ennio Morricone.

It was an Italian-Spanish-American international co-production between American company Filmways and Lupo-Anthony-Quintano Productions, an independent production and financing company co-founded by stars Anthony and Quintano. It is a spiritual successor to the 1981 film Comin' at Ya!, also directed by Baldi and starring Anthony and Quintano. Like its predecessor, the film was shot in 3-D and was part of the brief 3-D revival in the early 1980s.

Treasure of the Four Crowns was released on January 21, 1983, in the North America by Cannon Films, Inc. and by Columbia Pictures internationally, and was criticized as being overly derivative of Raiders of the Lost Ark, most particularly the scene in which the main character runs away from a flaming boulder.

== Plot ==
The film follows J.T. Striker, a Soldier of Fortune (Tony Anthony), who has been hired to assemble a group of professional thieves to retrieve the gems which are hidden inside two of the remaining four Mystical Crowns. Striker braves a mysterious magical cave in which skeletons and spears appear and jump out at him. He discovers a scroll in one of the crowns in the cave, which tells him that the fourth crown had disappeared long ago. He denies that the gems are magical or even valuable. He succumbs to the belief eventually and sets off to find the last two crowns, which are being held inside a heavily guarded compound, that is the home of a cult led by the evil Brother Jonas.

Striker's team suffers casualties from booby traps as it performs a dangerous acrobatic commando raid on the room where the crowns are kept. Striker retrieves the gems from the two magical crowns, and the magic makes his head literally spin. His face becomes half deformed, like that of Two-Face. Striker shoots fire from his fingers, melting the henchmen, their weapons, and Jonas. After, the film cuts to a shot of a boggy swamp, where a large pile of slimy brown sludge rises from the swampy water. A head like that of a moray eel with crystal blue eyes shoots towards the screen for a 3-D effect, setting up for a sequel that never happened.

== Cast ==
- Tony Anthony as J.T. Striker
- Ana Obregón as Liz
- Gene Quintano as Edmond
- Jerry Lazarus as Rick
- Francisco Rabal as Sócrates
- Emiliano Redondo as Brother Jonas
- Francisco Villena as Professor Montgomery
- Lewis Gordon as Popo

== Production ==
"Most of the other 3-D films have been R-rated," says Quintano. "Ours is PG because we wanted the whole family to come and enjoy the 3-D experience."

Although promotional materials for Treasure of the Four Crowns heralded "SuperVision" and "WonderVision," the film was actually shot using the Marks 3-Depix Converter, which had previously been used for Friday the 13th Part III. Like other 3-D systems in use in the early 1980s, 3-Depix "stacked" its Techniscope-sized left and right images one above the other on a single band of 35mm film. The resulting stereoscopic image had an aspect ratio of about 2.4:1.

In many theaters, projection was accomplished using the Polarator projection attachment offered by the Marks Polarized Corporation, makers of the 3-Depix unit. Audiences watched the film through color-neutral linear polarizers. The claim has been made that actor Tony Anthony himself invented a low-cost projection unit that found use in some venues.

== Reception ==
The film was a box office disappointment.

== Home media ==
MGM released Treasure of the Four Crowns on VHS in the 1980s. Treasure of the Four Crowns was also available on CED video discs. Shout Factory released Treasure of the Four Crowns on DVD on July 15, 2014, as part of a four film set on two discs with a SRP of $9.99. Both releases are 4:3 aspect ratio, not the original 2.35:1 anamorphic format. On February 6, 2021, the 3D Film Archive announced that it was restoring the film from its original negatives for release on Blu-ray 3D. The finished 3D restoration was released on Blu-ray by Kino Lorber on May 10, 2022.

== Soundtrack ==
The film's score was composed by Ennio Morricone.

1. "Crowning Glory" — 3:54
2. "Everything Happens To Morgan" — 3:47
3. "Brotherhood Of The Crowns" — 2:14
4. "Exploration" — 3:24
5. "Bistro" — 1:33
6. "Birds Of Frey" —3:43
7. "City of Love and Unity" — 2:04
8. "Castle of Evil" — 2:56
9. "Bobsled Run" — 1:40
10. "The Golden Crowns" — 3:14
11. "Danger Point" — 3:08
12. "Circus-Socrates The Strongman" — 1:44
13. "Sound of the Alarm" — 2:58
14. "The Final Act" — 3:38
