= Blindman =

1971 film by Ferdinando Baldi

- American theatrical release poster
- Directed by: Ferdinando Baldi
- Screenplay by: Vincenzo Cerami; Pier Giovanni Anchisi; Tony Anthony
- Story by: Tony Anthony
- Produced by: Allen Klein; Tony Anthony; Saul Swimmer
- Starring: Tony Anthony; Ringo Starr; Lloyd Battista
- Cinematography: Riccardo Pallottini
- Edited by: Roberto Perpignani
- Music by: Stelvio Cipriani
- Production company: ABKCO Films
- Distributed by: Produzioni Atlas Consorziate (P.A.C.) (Italy); 20th Century Fox (International)
- Release dates: 15 November 1971 (Italy); 12 January 1972 (US)
- Running time: 105 minutes
- Countries: Italy; United States
- Languages: English; Italian
- Budget: $1.3 million
- Box office: $15 million

Blindman (also known in Italian as Il Pistolero Cieco, lit. "The Blind Gunfighter") is a 1971 Spaghetti Western film directed by Ferdinando Baldi and co-written and co-produced by Tony Anthony. The film's protagonist, played by Anthony, is an homage to Kan Shimozawa's Zatoichi character: a blind transient who does odd jobs and is actually a high-skilled warrior.

The film has achieved cult status over the years, mainly due to the involvement of Ringo Starr, a former member of the Beatles, in one of the roles.

== Plot ==
A blind but deadly gunman is hired to escort 50 mail order brides to their miner husbands. When he is double-crossed by his friends and a Mexican bandit, he heads for Mexico to settle scores and save the women.

== Cast ==
- Tony Anthony as Blindman/Ciego
- Ringo Starr as Candy
- Lloyd Battista as Domingo
- Magda Konopka as Sweet Mama
- Raf Baldassarre as El General
- Agneta Eckemyr as Pilar
- David Dreyer as Dude
- Marisa Solinas as Margherita
- Gaetano Scala as Domingo Henchman
- Franz von Treuberg as Pilar's Father
- Carla Brait as Maid
- John Frederick as Sheriff
- Guido Mannari as Mexican Officer
- Fortunato Arena as Mexican Officer
- Salvatore Billa as Domingo Henchman
- Renato Romano as Skunk (uncredited)
- Tito García as Train Engineer (uncredited)
- Allen Klein as Fat Rifleman (uncredited)
- Mal Evans as Bearded Rifleman (uncredited)

Brides

- Mary Badin
- Dominque Badou
- Shirley Corrigan
- Giuliana Giuliani
- Katerina Lindfelt
- Malisa Longo
- Alice Mannell
- Krista Nell
- Helen Parker
- Elena Pedemonte
- Janine Reynaud
- Karin Skarreso
- Solvi Stubing
- Melù Valente
