= Dollar for the Dead =

1998 American television film by Gene Quintano

- DVD cover art
- Genre: Western
- Written by: Gene Quintano
- Directed by: Gene Quintano
- Starring: Emilio Estevez; William Forsythe; Howie Long
- Theme music composer: George S. Clinton
- Countries of origin: United States; Spain
- Original language: English

Production
- Producers: Enrique Cerezo; Tony Anthony
- Cinematography: Giovanni Fiore Coltellacci
- Editors: Neil Kirk; Michael Marisi Ornstein
- Running time: 94 minutes
- Production companies: Endemol Entertainment; Once Upon a Time Films; Enrique Cerezo Producciones Cinematográficas S.A.

Original release
- Network: TNT
- Release: October 11, 1998

Dollar for the Dead is a 1998 American Western television film. The film was directed and written by Gene Quintano and stars Emilio Estevez. It is the third Western film in which Estevez stars. The film premiered on TNT on October 11, 1998. The film also stars William Forsythe, Joaquim de Almeida, Jonathan Banks, Ed Lauter and Howie Long. Actor Jordi Mollà was nominated for Fotogramas de Plata award.

Dollar for the Dead is often perceived as a tribute to the 1960s Spaghetti Westerns, with a liberal dose of modern Hong Kong film-making thrown in. Emilio Estevez portrays a "Man with No Name" role, stylistically akin to Clint Eastwood's 1960s westerns. The film also portrays an atmosphere similar to those of the 1960s, with numerous visual and character references to Sergio Leone's Dollars Trilogy films A Fistful of Dollars, The Good, the Bad and the Ugly, as well as non-Eastwood films such as Once Upon a Time in the West, The Wild Bunch and Butch Cassidy and the Sundance Kid.

== Plot ==
Lone super-quick gunslinger "nameless" Cowboy (Estevez) is on the run from a rancher (Long) and his men, who are out to kill him for killing the rancher's son. A former Confederate soldier (Forsythe) sees how can Cowboy defend himself, even dropping a drink, pulling and shooting a guy, and catching his drink before it hits the floor. Cowboy gets mixed up with this soldier who has knowledge of hidden gold. So, Cowboy and Dooley, the Soldier tries to complete their map and find the gold because Dooley has only one part of the map. And also Col. Skinner (Redleg commander) on the tale of Dooley.

When Cowboy and Dooley free a man (Lauter) with part of the map to the gold, they then are also pursued by Spanish soldiers. It all leads to a small Mexican town terrorized by soldiers and led a by a good priest (De Almeida) who is another one which has knowledge of the hidden gold.

== Cast ==
- Emilio Estevez as Cowboy
- William Forsythe as Dooley
- Joaquim de Almeida as Friar Ramon
- Jonathan Banks as Colonel Skinner
- Howie Long as Reager
- Ed Lauter as Jacob Colby
- Lance Kinsey as Tracker
- Jordi Mollà as Federale Captain

== Production ==
Dollar for the Dead was filmed in Almeria, Spain, using some of the same sets and crew Leone used for his western films in the 1960s.
