= The Stranger Returns =

1967 film

- US film poster
- Directed by: Luigi Vanzi
- Screenplay by: Roberto Infascelli (as Bob Enescelle Jr.); Jone Mang
- Story by: Tony Anthony
- Produced by: Allen Klein; Roberto Infascelli; Massimo Gualdi
- Starring: Tony Anthony; Dan Vadis
- Cinematography: Marcello Masciocchi
- Edited by: Renzo Lucidi
- Music by: Stelvio Cipriani
- Production companies: Compagnia Generale Cinematografica; Primex Italiana; Juventus Film; Reverse Producers Corp.
- Distributed by: Generalcine (Italy); Metro-Goldwyn-Mayer (US)
- Release dates: 17 August 1967 (Italy); August 1968 (US)
- Running time: 90 minutes
- Countries: Italy; West Germany; United States
- Languages: Italian; English

The Stranger Returns (Italian: Un uomo, un cavallo, una pistola, lit. A Man, a Horse, a Gun) also known as Shoot First... Laugh Last!, is a 1967 Italian-West German-American Spaghetti Western film directed by Luigi Vanzi. It is a sequel to A Stranger in Town.

The film is the second in a series of four western films starring Tony Anthony as "The Stranger".

== Cast ==
- Tony Anthony - The Stranger
- Dan Vadis - En Plein
- Daniele Vargas - Good Jim
- Marco Guglielmi - The Preacher
- Jill Banner - Caroline
- Marina Berti - Ethel
- Raf Baldassarre - Chrysler
- Mario Novelli (as Anthony Freeman): Austin
- Renato Mambor: Alvarez
- Ettore Manni: Lieutenant George Stafford
- Mario Dionisi: El Plein Henchman
- Fred Coplan: El Plein Henchman

== Reception ==
Paul Mavis, of DVDTalk, reviewing the Warner Archive Collection 2015 DVD release of The Stranger Collection, wrote, "While they're not in the league of Leone (what is?), Anthony's grimy, sneaky little punk killer is an intriguing addition to the genre. Tony Anthony did some very interesting things with the spaghetti Western genre, including, perhaps, presaging the Trinity movies, while certainly "inventing" the West-meets-East subgenre."
