= Allen Klein =

American businessman and talent manager (1931–2009)

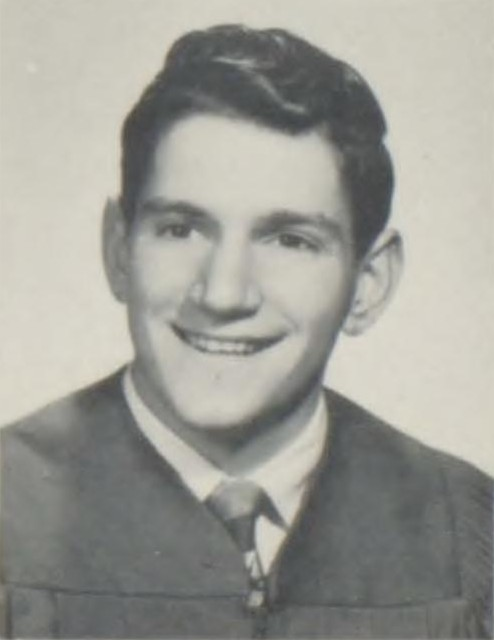
- Klein in 1950
- Born: December 18, 1931; Newark, New Jersey, U.S.
- Died: July 4, 2009 (aged 77); New York City, New York, U.S.
- Education: Upsala College
- Occupations: Accountant; record label executive; business manager
- Organization: ABKCO Records
- Spouse: Betty Rosenblum (m. 1958)
- Children: 3

Allen Klein (December 18, 1931 – July 4, 2009) was an American businessman who was the manager of the Rolling Stones and later the Beatles, along with many other artists. This made him one of the most powerful individuals in the music industry during his era.

Klein acquired a reputation as a tough negotiator who could bring money to his clients. Klein set up what he called "buy/sell agreements" through which a company that Klein owned became an intermediary between his client and the record label, owning the rights to the music, financing the recording and production of the music, and selling them to record labels to manufacture and distribute the music. Klein would subsequently pay royalties and cash advances to his client. Although Klein greatly increased his clients' incomes, he also enriched himself, sometimes without his clients' knowledge. The Rolling Stones' $1.25 million advance from the Decca Records label in 1965, for example, was deposited into a company that Klein had established, and the fine print of the contract did not require Klein to release it for 20 years (it was paid in 1971 after the Stones sued Klein). Klein's involvement with both the Beatles and the Rolling Stones would lead to years of litigation. The Rolling Stones in particular accused Klein of withholding royalty payments, stealing the publishing rights to their songs, and neglecting to pay their taxes for five years, thereby necessitating their French "exile" in 1971.

== Early life and career ==
Klein was born in Newark, New Jersey, the fourth child and only son of Jewish immigrants. His mother died of cancer soon afterward, and Klein lived for a time with his grandparents, then in a Jewish orphanage, until his father remarried shortly before Klein's 10th birthday. An indifferent student, he graduated from Weequahic High School in 1950; fellow graduate Philip Roth was the only classmate to sign his yearbook.

In early work experience with a magazine and newspaper distribution company, Klein showed skill with numbers, and learned about how profits were often concealed from those who had been crucial in generating them. Eventually he realized that much the same situation existed in popular music, where labels routinely took much profit from the transitory careers of the artists who created the profit-generating music, paying them less than Klein thought they should.

Klein enlisted in the U.S. Army in 1951, and served as a clerk typist on Governors Island, New York. After military service, and with the assistance of the G.I. Bill, Klein majored in accounting at Upsala College, graduating in 1957, and was hired by a Manhattan accounting firm, Joseph Fenton and Company. He was assigned to assist Joe Fenton in an audit of a music publishers' organization, the Harry Fox Agency, and several record companies, including Dot Records, Liberty Records, and Monarch Records. In an early setback to Klein's career, Joseph Fenton and Company fired him after four months because of chronic lateness. The company wrote to the State of New Jersey urging officials not to approve him as a Certified Public Accountant, and Klein chose not to take the examination. He briefly attended law school but soon dropped out.

Aided by his friendship with music publisher Don Kirshner, a fellow Upsala College alumnus, Klein worked as an accountant for the next several years, assisted by Henry Newfeld, a CPA who was a friend from school and the Army, and Marty Weinberg, another CPA, under the name Allen Klein and Company. Klein's clients included Ersel Hickey, Dimitri Tiomkin, Steve Lawrence, Eydie Gormé, Sam Cooke, Buddy Knox, Jimmy Bowen, Lloyd Price, Neil Sedaka, Bobby Darin, Bobby Vinton, Scepter Records, and the estate of Mike Todd. A key early contact was attorney Marty Machat, who frequently did legal work for Klein.

== Personal life ==
In June 1958, Klein married Betty Rosenblum, a Hunter College student seven years his junior. The couple had three children.

== Sam Cooke ==
Two of Klein's early clients, rockabilly singers Knox and Bowen, were owed royalties by Roulette Records. Morris Levy, co-owner of Roulette, was feared because of his organized crime connections, and was known to pay artists as little as possible. Klein persuaded him to pay Knox and Bowen the royalties they were owed over a four-year period. Klein's success with the Knox and Bowen negotiation brought him new clients, and he and Levy became lifelong friends.

In 1963, Klein began a business partnership with Jocko Henderson, an urbane black disc jockey who had daily radio shows in both Philadelphia and New York City. Henderson hosted lavish, profitable live rhythm-and-blues shows at the Apollo Theater in Harlem, and formed a partnership with Klein to begin doing the same in Philadelphia. As Henderson's partner, Klein was introduced to Sam Cooke, a preeminent talent equally adept at writing, producing, and performing his numerous hit records. Cooke had four top-ten hits between 1957 and 1963, including his number one hit, "You Send Me," among 33 records in the top 100 in that period. Although Cooke was clearly making his label, RCA Records, a great deal of money, label executives nonetheless repeatedly refused to honor his many requests for a review of his accounts. Klein forced the label to open its books for a thorough audit. Shortly afterward, RCA agreed to renegotiate Cooke's contract.

Klein secured Cooke a genuinely groundbreaking deal. Cooke created a holding company, Tracey Ltd., named after Cooke's middle daughter. Klein, Cooke's manager, sneakily changed paperwork and listed himself as owner instead (and Cooke as his employee). Cooke trusted him to protect him against crooked music executives but Klein used that trust to his own advantage.

Tracey manufactured Cooke's recordings and gave exclusive rights to RCA to sell them for 30 years, after which the rights would revert to Tracey. Cooke received a cash advance of $100,000 per year for three years, followed by $75,000 for each of two option years. Instead of being paid the first $100,000 in cash, Cooke was paid in Tracey preferred stock, which would be taxed only when he sold it. The deal benefited Cooke, but also greatly benefited Klein, who ended up owning the rights to all of Cooke's recordings made since the contract renegotiation when Cooke was killed in 1964 and his widow sold Cooke's remaining rights to Klein.

Klein's successful negotiations on Cooke's behalf brought him new clients, including Bobby Vinton and the Dave Clark Five. As with Cooke, Klein arranged for his clients to be paid over a period of time to reduce their tax liability. This also benefited Klein, who took advantage of the earning potential of money over time to "make money from the money."

According to the 2019 documentary Lady You Shot Me: The Life and Death of Sam Cooke, Klein had a predatory relationship with Cooke. As of 2019, Cooke's family received no royalties or benefits from his music. All royalties and publishing profits go to Klein's corporation.

== Mickie Most and the British Invasion ==
In 1964, Klein became the American business manager of Mickie Most, a former singer who was the producer of hits for the Animals and Herman's Hermits. Klein extended to Most a million-dollar promise, adding that if he failed to deliver in only one month, Most owed him nothing. Klein did deliver, through strategic renegotiations of existing contracts and new producing opportunities for RCA, including offers for Most to produce for both Cooke and Elvis Presley. Though the latter two prospects did not materialize, Most was suddenly one of the most talked-about and financially gratified figures in the English recording industry, and Klein was a step closer to eventual agreements with both the Beatles and the Rolling Stones.

His victories for Most won Klein access to several key English musicians. He eventually negotiated vastly improved deals for The Animals, Herman's Hermits, the Kinks, Lulu, Donovan, and Pete Townshend of the Who. But Klein's help came at a price. To shelter his clients' money from Britain's high taxation rate on income earned abroad, Klein held it for them at the Chemical Bank in New York City and paid it to them over periods of time of up to 20 years. Klein invested that money, which earned far more than Klein was obligated to pay his clients, and kept the difference, thereby maintaining control over the money.

== The Rolling Stones ==
In the spring of 1965 Andrew Loog Oldham, co-manager of the Rolling Stones, saw in Klein a terrific business adviser and ally, one who could help him win an incipient power struggle with Eric Easton, a music business veteran who was then the other half of the band's management team. Barely 21, Oldham was profoundly important in the development of the Stones' image, and in initiating the songwriting partnership of Keith Richards and Mick Jagger. After some management mishaps, blame for which fell at Easton's feet, and Jagger's ascension in the band's hierarchy following "(I Can't Get No) Satisfaction", the Stones' first number one record in the U.S., Oldham received Jagger's blessing to bring Klein aboard to renegotiate the band's contract with Decca Records. The label offered the band the opportunity to make $300,000 if their records continued to sell. Klein countered with, and quickly secured, an arrangement paying the Stones twice as much, in the form of an advance. He also forced London Records, Decca's American subsidiary, to sign a separate contract. It too was for $600,000. By the time Klein renegotiated the deal a year later, Easton having been removed as co-manager, the Stones were guaranteed $2.6 million—more than the Beatles were making.

When Klein examined the Stones' management contract with Easton and Oldham, he found that the two were receiving a disproportionate share of the group's income: not only did Easton and Oldham receive an 8% royalty on sales of the Stones' singles—the Stones themselves received only 6%—but they also received a 25% commission on the Stones' income. At Klein's insistence, Oldham increased the Stones' royalties to 7% and relinquished his commission. Klein offered the Stones a million-dollar minimum guarantee, paid over a 20-year period to reduce the Stones' tax liability, to let him become their music publisher, based on his faith in the Jagger–Richards songwriting team. He also arranged for a level of tour support and publicity far above anything the band had previously experienced for the Stones' 1965 American tour in support of the album December's Children.

Jagger, who had studied at the London School of Economics, gradually became distrustful of Klein, particularly because of Klein's ability to insert himself as a profit participant in the group's ever-growing financial affairs. For example, in 1968 Klein very profitably bought out Oldham's share in the band for $750,000. By 1968 the Stones were so concerned with how Klein was handling their finances that they hired a London law firm, Berger Oliver & Co, to look into it, and Jagger hired the merchant banker Prince Rupert Löwenstein as his personal financial adviser. Another possible factor in the Stones' dissatisfaction with Klein was that when he began to manage the Beatles he focused more of his attention on that band's affairs than on the concerns of the Stones. In 1970, on the occasion of needing to negotiate a new contract with Decca, Jagger announced that Löwenstein would replace Klein as manager.

The split between Klein and the Stones led to years of litigation. In 1971 the Stones sued Klein over U.S. publishing rights. The suit was settled the following year, with the Stones receiving $1.2 million as a settlement of all U.S. royalties earned up to that point (essentially the $1.25 million advance that Decca had paid the Stones in 1965 that Klein had been withholding since August 1965). But the Stones were unable to break their contract with Klein, who held an additional $2 million of their money to be paid over a 15-year period, ostensibly for tax purposes. Klein's company, ABKCO, continued to control the rights to publish the Stones' music and Klein made a fortune off the band's all-time best-selling album, Hot Rocks 1964–1971.

In 1972, Klein alleged that some of the songs on Exile on Main Street had been composed while the Stones were still under contract with ABKCO. As a result, ABKCO acquired ownership of the disputed songs and was able to publish another Rolling Stones album, More Hot Rocks (Big Hits and Fazed Cookies). In 1974 negotiations over royalties led to a payment of $375,000 to the Stones and ABKCO's release of an additional Rolling Stones album, Metamorphosis. In 1975 more lawsuits and negotiations resulted in a $1 million payment to the Stones for non-payment by Klein of songwriting royalties, and the release of four Rolling Stones albums, including Rock and Roll Circus and Rolled Gold: The Very Best of the Rolling Stones. In 1984 Jagger and Richards sued to break their publishing agreement with ABKCO because of non-payment of royalties. The judge encouraged the two sides to reach a settlement.

Starting in 1986, when the introduction of compact discs brought great profits to the music industry, relations began to improve between Klein and the Stones. In 2002, the Stones' album Forty Licks and the Licks Tour, celebrating the band's 40th anniversary, incorporated songs owned by ABKCO. The Stones agreed to a five-year payment plan suggested by Klein's son, Jody. In 2003, Klein negotiated with Steve Jobs to make ABKCO's Rolling Stones songs available on iTunes.

== Cameo-Parkway and ABKCO ==
In February 1967, with an eye toward producing films and finding a way to invest his clients' money, Klein attempted to acquire Metro-Goldwyn-Mayer. His hopes were blunted when Edgar Bronfman, Sr., heir to the Seagram fortune, instead took control of the firm. Klein then turned his attention to Cameo-Parkway Records, a Philadelphia-born, Los Angeles-based label that had enjoyed hits in the late 1950s and early 1960s, thanks to Chubby Checker, Bobby Rydell, Dee Dee Sharp, and others, but that by 1967 was no longer prospering. It was one of the first publicly traded record companies, making it ideal for a financial maneuver Klein had in mind, known as a reverse acquisition. It was meant to take Allen Klein and Company public via its being acquired on paper by Cameo-Parkway. By July 1967, Klein and his associate Abbey Butler had acquired a controlling interest and filed to rename Cameo-Parkway ABKCO, an acronym for "The Allen and Betty Klein Company." Fueled by speculation, the stock price increased from $1.75 a share in July 1967 to a peak of 76 3/8 in February 1968 before the SEC halted trading. The American Stock Exchange declined to reinstate the stock; instead, ABKCO continued to trade over the counter, and the stock price dropped to more realistic levels. In 1987, Klein made ABKCO a privately held company.

== The Beatles ==
In 1964, Klein approached the Beatles' manager, Brian Epstein, with an offer for the Beatles to sign with RCA for $2 million. Epstein was not interested, saying he was loyal to EMI. After Epstein died in August 1967, the group formed Apple Corps in the following January. They hoped it would provide the means for correcting Epstein's unfortunate business decisions, which had both limited their incomes and ensured high tax burdens. Although "Hey Jude", the Beatles' first Apple release, was an enormous success, the label was a financial mess, with little accountability for how money was spent.

Klein contacted John Lennon after reading his press comment that the Beatles would be "broke in six months" if things continued as they were. On January 26, 1969, he met with Lennon, who retained Klein as his financial representative, and the next day met with the other Beatles. Paul McCartney preferred to be represented by Lee and John Eastman, the father and brother respectively of McCartney's girlfriend Linda, whom he married on March 12. Given a choice between Klein and the Eastmans, George Harrison and Ringo Starr preferred Klein. Following rancorous London meetings with both Eastmans in April, Klein was appointed as the Beatles' manager on an interim basis, with the Eastmans appointed as their attorneys. Continued conflict between Klein and the Eastmans made this arrangement unworkable. The Eastmans were dismissed as the Beatles' attorneys, and on May 8 Klein was given a three-year contract as the Beatles' business manager. McCartney refused to sign the contract but was outvoted by the other Beatles.

Once in charge of Apple, Klein fired many of its employees, including president Ron Kass, and replaced them with his own people. He closed Apple Electronics, which was headed by Alexis Mardas. Mardas resigned his directorship in May 1971. Klein's attempt to fire Neil Aspinall, a longtime confidant of the Beatles, was immediately thwarted by the band.

Klein was hit with his first crisis in managing the Beatles when Clive Epstein, brother of Brian and chief heir to NEMS, the management company Brian had founded, sold NEMS to Triumph, a British investment group managed by Leonard Richenberg. NEMS held a 25% stake in the Beatles' earnings, which Klein and the Beatles desperately wanted to buy out. This led to tough negotiations with Triumph. Klein ultimately secured the Beatles' rights in their previous work for just four annual payments amounting to 5% of their earnings. But in the lead-up to those negotiations Richenberg commissioned a hostile investigative report on Klein, which The Sunday Times ran under the headline "The Toughest Wheeler-Dealer in the Pop Jungle".

An even more important battle to secure the Beatles a financial situation commensurate with their acclaim was with Northern Songs Ltd., the publishing company. Northern Songs was managed by Dick James, whom Brian Epstein had rewarded with the Beatles' publishing rights in return for helping them get placed on a TV show, Thank Your Lucky Stars, early in their career. But James had constructed a contract that gave him an outsize share and Epstein had not understood its implications. James knew that Klein would soon eliminate his perks, so he quickly offered to sell Northern Songs to ATV, run by entertainment mogul Lew Grade, rather than allow Lennon and McCartney an opportunity to buy back publishing rights to their songs. Klein worked feverishly to pull together a consortium that would beat Grade's offer, but infighting between McCartney and Lennon derailed his efforts.

In September 1969, while Klein was renegotiating the Beatles' unsatisfactory recording agreements with EMI, Lennon told him of his plans to quit the group. It was agreed that this was the wrong time to either make or announce such a move. EMI was loath to renegotiate, but its American subsidiary, Capitol Records, was so impressed by Abbey Road that it agreed to vastly improved royalty terms. McCartney joined his bandmates in endorsing the deal Klein had secured.

Abbey Road proved to be the Beatles' last true collaboration, but Klein recognised an opportunity in the band's shelved January 1969 album and related documentary project, both titled Get Back, to get another album release out of the splintered band while also fulfilling its obligation to provide one more film to United Artists, the studio that had released A Hard Day's Night and Help!. Phil Spector, the producer famous for his "wall of sound" recordings with artists such as the Ronettes and the Righteous Brothers, was eager to sign on as producer for the album, which was eventually titled Let It Be. McCartney did not approve of Spector, but the other Beatles did. This proved to be McCartney and Klein's last face-to-face meeting. Apple made $6 million in the month following the May 1970 release of the record and the film.

Unhappy with production decisions on the Let It Be album and the other Beatles' decision to hire Klein as their manager, McCartney went public with his plans to leave the Beatles in April 1970. He wanted to be released from his partnership with Lennon, Starr, and Harrison, who had in recent months been a steady three-to-one majority against McCartney's proposals. The Eastmans convinced McCartney to sue his former bandmates for dissolution of the Beatles' partnership, which he did on December 31, 1970.

The judge ruled in McCartney's favor in March 1971. He decided that the combined financial affairs of the former Beatles should be placed in the care of a receiver until mutually acceptable terms for their breakup could be found. Klein thereby retained a position in the post-breakup solo careers of Harrison, Starr, and Lennon, but was no longer in charge of their affairs as a partnership.

== Solo Beatles ==
For the first few years after the Beatles' contentious break-up, George Harrison was widely seen as the most accomplished and artistically successful former Beatle. His November 1970 three-disc set, All Things Must Pass, was a sales triumph, and produced hit singles in "My Sweet Lord" and "What Is Life". In the spring of 1971, Harrison learned from his friend and mentor, Ravi Shankar, about the desperate people of Bangladesh, who had been devastated both by military violence and a vicious cyclone. Harrison immediately set about organizing an event at Madison Square Garden within just five weeks—the Concert for Bangladesh—from which a live album could raise further funds for Bangladeshi refugees. Klein hustled to get the invited artists, including Bob Dylan and Eric Clapton, to play for free while donating their shares of royalties to charity, and convinced Capitol Records to grant an unprecedented 50% royalty rate. The Concert for Bangladesh live album and film raised over $15 million. But Klein failed to register the shows as a UNICEF charity event; as a result, the proceeds were denied tax-exempt status in Britain and the U.S. The IRS attempted to tax the income, and $10 million of that amount was held back for years.

Starr, Harrison, and Lennon soon became disenchanted with Klein. By mid-1972, Harrison was incensed at the outcome of Klein's handling of the Bangladesh relief effort. Aside from the question of its charity status, unwelcome attention had been drawn to the project after an article in New York magazine accused Klein of pocketing $1.14 on each copy of the live album (priced at $10)—allegations that raised suspicions among the three former Beatles with regard to his conduct in their business affairs. Lennon also felt betrayed by Klein's lack of support for his and Yoko Ono's increasingly politically focused work, typified by their 1972 album Some Time in New York City. (Note: Klein's opposition to Some Time in New York City was based on the likelihood that its US sales would fall short of 500,000 units, which would disqualify the former Beatles from receiving their second royalty increase, under the terms of their agreement with Capitol. Before its release, Klein negotiated with the record company to have the album discounted from this contractual stipulation, so demonstrating a degree of foresight that, author Peter Doggett writes, "Lennon never gave him credit for" when discussing Klein's contribution.) In early 1973 Lennon, Harrison, and Starr served notice that they would not renew Klein's management contract when it expired in March. Early the next month, Lennon told an interviewer: "Let's say possibly Paul's suspicions were right … and the timing was right."

Klein responded by suing the Beatles and Apple in New York to recoup the loans he had made to his three former clients and other costs owing to ABKCO. They then sued him in the London courts, citing excessive commission fees, the mishandling of the Concert for Bangladesh, his misrepresentation of their individual financial standings, and his failure to ensure that Apple Records' artists prospered under his control. (Note: Klein immediately countersued in London, in November 1973, for $19 million in unpaid fees. He also sued McCartney separately, for $34 million, but the suit was thrown out of court.) While the suits were ongoing, Klein made a play for the U.S. portion of Harrison's publishing company, Harrisongs, in late 1974, without success. He also attempted to influence the outcome of Lennon's arrangement with music publisher Morris Levy regarding an alleged copyright infringement (of the Chuck Berry song "You Can't Catch Me") in Lennon's 1969 Beatles composition "Come Together". Lennon's song "Steel and Glass" from the 1974 album Walls and Bridges was his thinly veiled dig at Klein. (Note: In 1970, Harrison had included the line "Beware of ABKCO" in an early demo version of the song "Beware of Darkness". During his 1974 North American tour—the end of which he spent avoiding Klein's process server in New York—Harrison introduced a gag in the lyrics to "Sue Me, Sue You Blues": "Bring your lawyer and I'll bring Klein / Get together and we could have a bad time.")

Klein's 1973 lawsuit against the Beatles was settled out of court in January 1977, with Ono representing the former bandmates. Klein received a lump sum payment of approximately $5 million in lieu of future royalties and as repayment of the loans that ABKCO had made to the Beatles.

Harrison had been sued for copyright infringement in 1971 because of the alleged similarity of his song "My Sweet Lord" to "He's So Fine", which had been recorded by the Chiffons in 1963 and was owned by Bright Tunes Music. The case was still pending in 1976; as an alternate strategy to access Harrison's US publishing, Klein purchased Bright Tunes and thus became the plaintiff in the lawsuit against Harrison. The judge ruled that Harrison had infringed on Bright Tunes' copyright, and the ruling was upheld on appeal. The judge initially assessed damages of $2,133,316, which Harrison would have to pay to Klein, then reduced the figure to $1,599,987, but finally ruled in 1981 that Klein still had a fiduciary responsibility to Harrison and should not be allowed to profit from his acquisition of Bright Tunes. Klein was ordered to hold "He's So Fine" in trust for Harrison provided that Harrison reimburse him the $587,000 it had cost Klein to purchase the company.

== Films and theater ==
The multi-Academy Award-winning 1955 film Marty, an independently produced movie that undercut the Hollywood studio system, provided a business template Klein closely studied and later adapted to the recording industry. In the late 1950s Klein shared an office with press agent Bernie Kamber, who represented Burt Lancaster, one of Marty's producers. Klein absorbed much from Kamber about how the producers had structured their business model, a paradigm whose strength derived from the fact that artists, not film studios or record labels, drove marketplace success and that intense preparation and canny negotiation could lavishly reward artists and their representatives. In 1961 Klein did accountancy work for an independent film, Force of Impulse, and formed lasting relationships that he turned to for many film projects of his own. In 1962 he produced a film, Without Each Other. He took it to the Cannes Film Festival and later claimed that it had won the "Best American Picture Award" there, though no such award existed. A distributor never materialized, but Klein's enthusiasm for film persisted.

Starting in 1967 Klein produced four films in the Spaghetti Western genre, a lean-and-mean style of cowboy movie with taciturn heroes and explosive violence. Klein used actor Tony Anthony, whom he'd met on Force of Impulse, in all four. Their films included a trilogy comprising A Stranger In Town, The Stranger Returns (1967), and The Silent Stranger (shot in 1968 but not released until 1975 by United Artists). Blindman (1970) featured Ringo Starr as a Mexican bandit, Anthony as its lead, and Klein as an extra. The first two "Stranger" films were released by MGM, the studio where Klein produced Mrs. Brown, You've Got a Lovely Daughter starring the popular Herman's Hermits. Klein, who had tried to purchase MGM in the mid '60s, became involved with a lawsuit against MGM, with each accusing the other of not fulfilling their contracts with each other.

In 1971, John Lennon directed Klein's attention to El Topo, a surrealist western by Chilean director Alejandro Jodorowsky. Inspired by Lennon's enthusiasm, Klein bought the film and put it in American release. He then produced and financed Jodorowsky's next film, The Holy Mountain, an allegorical journey with psychedelic overtones. Later the producer and the director's planned collaboration on a proposed film version of Story of O was halted when Jodorowsky refused to make the film or return substantial advance monies. Klein retaliated by withdrawing both El Topo and The Holy Mountain from distribution. In 2008 Jodorowsky released the films in Europe and was sued by Klein. After a face-to-face reconciliation between the two, Klein dropped his lawsuit and ABKCO released the films on video, paying Jodorowsky to remaster them.

Klein's legs appeared in Lennon and Yoko Ono's 1971 film Up Your Legs Forever. With George Harrison, Klein co-produced the 1972 concert film The Concert for Bangladesh. Klein also produced the 1978 film The Greek Tycoon, in which Anthony Quinn and Jacqueline Bisset played characters based on Aristotle Onassis and Jacqueline Kennedy. In the early 1980s Klein produced two Broadway plays. It Had to be You, a romantic comedy starring Renée Taylor and Joseph Bologna, ran for barely a month. Next Klein produced The Man Who Had Three Arms, written by Edward Albee. Although Albee had had big successes with The Zoo Story and Who's Afraid of Virginia Woolf?, the play Klein produced had an even shorter run than his previous attempt.

== Criminal conviction and jail time ==
In 1977, Klein and ABKCO's former head of promotion, Pete Bennett, were each charged with three felony counts of income tax evasion for 1970, 1971, and 1972, and related misdemeanor counts of making false statements on their income tax returns for those years. The IRS, which had been investigating Klein for several years, claimed that Klein and Bennett had sold promotional copies of Beatles and post-Beatles albums—common practice in the music industry at the time—without declaring the sales on their tax returns. Klein was alleged to have received over $200,000. Bennett pleaded guilty to a single misdemeanor charge and became a witness against Klein. Klein testified that he had not instructed Bennett to sell promotional copies of albums and that although he'd received cash payments from Bennett, they were a return of cash advances Bennett had been given. Klein's first trial ended in a mistrial because the jury was deadlocked. At his second trial in 1979, the jury found Klein not guilty of the felony charges but guilty of a single misdemeanor charge for false statements on his 1972 tax return. Klein was fined $5,000 and sentenced to two months in jail, which he served in July–September 1980.

== Phil Spector ==
In 1988 Klein began managing Phil Spector's business affairs, including his publishing and recording assets. Spector had not been active as a producer for several years, but his early work was still frequently broadcast and licensed for film soundtracks. Spector's publishing company, Mother Bertha Music, Inc, was controlled by Trio, a Jerry Leiber and Mike Stoller company, which was in turn administered by Warner/Chappell Music. Warner/Chappell was making appropriate payments, but significant amounts were not being passed on to Spector. Klein's goal was to get Spector all the money owed him, and also to wrest a concession allowing Spector to co-administer the future licensing of his music. Klein and Spector sued in federal court, where a win would secure the first goal but not the second. Klein accordingly then advised a settlement strategy that proved successful.

== The Verve ==
On their 1997 single "Bitter Sweet Symphony", the English band The Verve sampled a 1965 orchestral version of the Rolling Stones song "The Last Time" by the Andrew Oldham Orchestra. Klein, who owned the copyrights to the Rolling Stones' early work, refused clearance for the sample; after a lawsuit, The Verve ceded the songwriting credits and royalties. The song became a hit, popular for use at sporting events, and it was a big money-maker for ABKCO, which licensed its use for commercials advertising Nike shoes and Opel automobiles. In 2019, Klein's son and the Rolling Stones returned the credits and royalties to Richard Ashcroft of The Verve.

== Death ==
Klein was diagnosed with diabetes at age 40. He suffered several heart attacks over the years, of varying severity. In 2004, the same year ABKCO received a Grammy Award for a Sam Cooke documentary, Legend, Klein fell and broke bones in his foot, requiring surgery. He was subsequently diagnosed with Alzheimer's disease. He died on July 4, 2009, in New York.

In June 2015, American journalist Fred Goodman published a biography of Klein, Allen Klein: The Man Who Bailed Out the Beatles, Made the Stones, and Transformed Rock & Roll.

== Legacy ==
In the 1978 television mockumentary The Rutles: All You Need is Cash, which parodies the career of the Beatles, Klein is portrayed as "Ron Decline", played by John Belushi. Introduced as "the most feared promoter in the world", Decline is so intimidating to his colleagues that they choose to throw themselves out of skyscraper windows rather than face him.

In his book You Never Give Me Your Money: The Battle for the Soul of the Beatles, Peter Doggett writes that Klein has come to be seen as one of the controversial "intruders" in the Beatles' story. Doggett writes:

Suspected for their motives, hated for their disruptive power, they all arrived from America and were all regarded as suspects for the crime of breaking up the Beatles, on the assumption that without them the group would have continued happily in each other's company until their dying days. The first of these intruders was Yoko Ono; the second was Linda Eastman; and the third was Allen Klein.

With the possible exception of Alexis Mardas, who occupied a far less central role, nobody in the Beatles' milieu has received a more damning verdict from historians than Allen Klein. He was, one said, "a tough little scorpion"; for another, "fast-talking, dirty-mouthed … sloppily dressed and grossly overweight"; again, "short and fat, beady-eyed and greasily pompadoured". Beatles aide Alistair Taylor said, "He had all the charm of a broken lavatory seat" ... So consistent was the vilification that when biographer Philip Norman merely described Klein as "a tubby little man", it sounded like a compliment.

… No such rehabilitation [as was later afforded Ono and Eastman] was available for Allen Klein, who entered the Beatles' story as a villain from central casting, and never escaped that role. Yet we are asked to believe that three of the four Beatles found this "beady-eyed" "grossly overweight" "scorpion" such an attractive figure that they were prepared to trust him with their futures. Clearly the Demon King didn't always exude the stench of sulphur.

== Sources ==
- Badman, Keith (2001). The Beatles Diary Volume 2: After the Break-Up 1970–2001. London: Omnibus Press. ISBN 978-0-7119-8307-6.
- Beatles, The (2000). The Beatles Anthology. San Francisco, CA: Chronicle Books. ISBN 0-8118-2684-8.
- Clayson, Alan (2003). George Harrison. London: Sanctuary. ISBN 1-86074-489-3.
- Coleman, Ray (1984). Lennon. McGraw-Hill. ISBN 0-07-011786-1.
- Doggett, Peter (2011). You Never Give Me Your Money: The Beatles After the Breakup. New York, NY: It Books. ISBN 978-0-06-177418-8.
- Goodman, Fred (2015). Allen Klein: The Man Who Bailed Out the Beatles, Made the Stones, and Transformed Rock & Roll. New York, NY: Houghton Mifflin Harcourt. ISBN 978-0-547-89686-1.
- Inglis, Ian (2010). The Words and Music of George Harrison. Santa Barbara, CA: Praeger. ISBN 978-0-313-37532-3.
- McMillian, John (2013). Beatles vs. Stones. New York, NY: Simon & Schuster. ISBN 978-14391-5969-9.
- Rej, Bent (2006). The Rolling Stones: In the Beginning. New York, NY: Firefly Books. ISBN 978-1-55407-230-9.
- Rodriguez, Robert (2010). Fab Four FAQ 2.0: The Beatles' Solo Years, 1970–1980. Milwaukee, WI: Backbeat Books. ISBN 978-1-4165-9093-4.
- Soocher, Stan (2015). Baby You're a Rich Man: Suing the Beatles for Fun and Profit. Lebanon, NH: University Press of New England. ISBN 978-1-61168-380-6.
