= Tony Anthony (actor) =

American actor (born 1937)

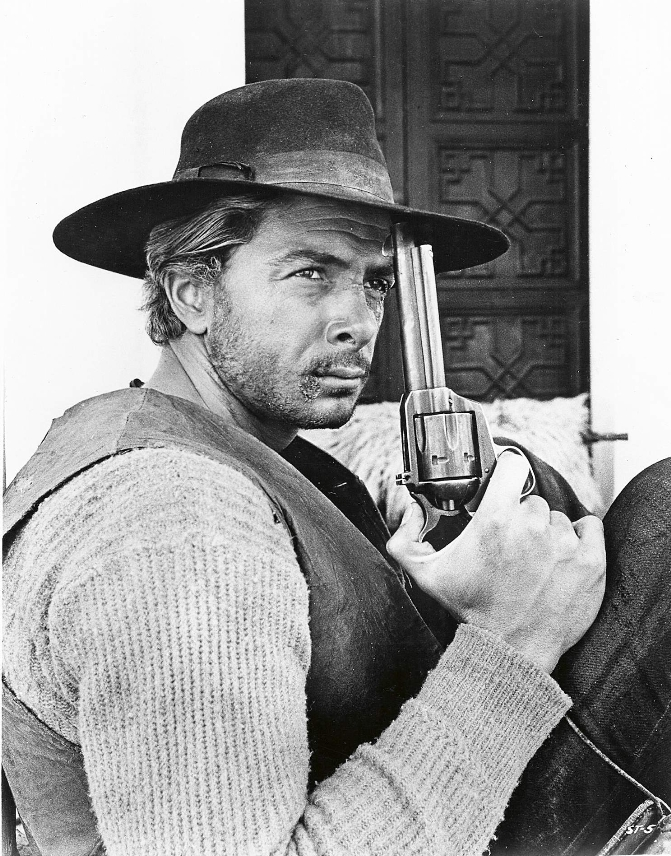
- Anthony as "The Stranger" during the production of A Stranger in Town (1967)
- Born: Tony Roger Petitto; October 16, 1937 (age 89); Clarksburg, West Virginia, U.S.
- Other name: Tony Petitto
- Education: Carnegie Mellon School of Drama
- Occupations: Film actor, producer, screenwriter, director
- Years active: 1959–1998
- Partner: Luciana Paluzzi (1960s–1970s)

Tony Anthony (born Tony Roger Petitto; October 16, 1937) is an American actor, producer, screenwriter and director best known for his starring roles in Spaghetti Westerns, most of which were produced with the aid of his friends and associates Allen Klein and Saul Swimmer. These films consist of The Stranger series – A Stranger in Town (1967), The Stranger Returns (1967), The Silent Stranger (1968) and Get Mean (1975) – and the Zatoichi-inspired Blindman (1971). Anthony also wrote, produced and starred in Comin' at Ya! (1981) and Treasure of the Four Crowns (1983), the first film being largely credited with beginning the 1980s revival of 3D films in Hollywood.

== Early career ==
Anthony was born Tony Roger Petitto in Clarksburg, West Virginia. With his friend Saul Swimmer directing, Anthony and Peter Gayle produced the half-hour children's short The Boy Who Owned a Melephant (1959), narrated by actress Tallulah Bankhead. The three men would become frequent collaborators. The film won a Gold Leaf award at the Venice International Children's Film Festival. Following that short, Anthony and Swimmer co-wrote the Swimmer-directed independent features Force of Impulse (1961), a Romeo and Juliet story about a high school football player who turns to robbery, filmed in Miami Beach, Florida, and Without Each Other (1962). Anthony then moved to Italy to film Wounds of Hunger and La ragazza in prestito. Swimmer had moved to England, where he befriended Allen Klein.

== Spaghetti westerns ==
Anthony was in Europe when Sergio Leone's westerns were setting box office records, but had not yet been released in America. Anthony contacted Klein, then a major stockholder at Metro-Goldwyn-Mayer, about releasing a spaghetti western, for which he had played the lead role, in the United States. Anthony had also served as an uncredited executive producer on the film, having raised $40,000 with another American, James Hagar. The film Klein released was called A Stranger in Town, starring Anthony as the Stranger, a shotgun-wielding antihero who helps a group of Mexican bandits steal gold from the US Army and Federales, and then steals it right back from them. Released by MGM to compete with United Artists' Dollars Trilogy starring Clint Eastwood, it became a surprise success, and spawned three sequels in which Anthony reprised his role.

With these films, some felt Anthony's persona was not the typical tough spaghetti western hero; the Stranger was vulnerable and sneaky, with a sardonic sense of humor. Anthony recalled that director Luigi Vanzi constantly described the character to him as "a bad guy but you do good in spite of yourself. You're not Gary Cooper. You're not John Wayne. You're not the 'tall in the saddle' cowboy. You're the street guy. The audience can identify with you because you look like the guy that goes into movie theaters and says 'Well, I could be like him'." Anthony himself described the Stranger as "a dirty coal-mining cowboy". The second Stranger film, The Stranger Returns has a golden stagecoach as its MacGuffin and a Stelvio Cipriani score that had several cover versions by various orchestras. Anthony's willingness to experiment with the genre resulted in the third series entry, The Silent Stranger with another Cipriani score. Considered by some the first "East-meets-West Western", predating Red Sun by three years, its release was delayed for seven years in the US due to a dispute between Klein and MGM, and never received a European release. Anthony later declared the film his best and lamented the cuts that MGM made to it.

His next film was Blindman, a spaghetti western variation on the Zatoichi series. Anthony plays a blind gunslinger hired to escort 50 mail-order brides to their husbands. By that time, Klein had been the manager of the Beatles, and Swimmer had directed many of their music videos and concert films. Both were producers on Blindman, and their presence led to Ringo Starr accepting a supporting role as one of the bandits. Starr would produce Anthony's next film, which Swimmer would direct: a road movie called Come Together. In this film, Anthony plays an American stuntman working on spaghetti westerns in Rome. The film contains behind the scenes-footage of a Spaghetti Western being shot.

In 1975, long after the heyday of the genre, Anthony starred as the Stranger for a fourth time in Get Mean produced by Ron Schneider. A unique film often compared to Sam Raimi's Army of Darkness, the film takes place in Spain, where the Stranger has to battle invading Vikings and Moors after escorting a princess there. It failed to find a wide audience.

== 3D years ==
In 1981, Anthony returned to the spaghetti well for Comin' at Ya!, a 3D western he wrote, produced, and starred in. In order for the film to receive a wide release, Anthony designed a low-cost projection lens which was cheaper than conventional 3-D lenses.

Anthony would star in one more 3D film, Treasure of the Four Crowns. Anthony next announced a 3D science-fiction movie called Seeing is Believing, but with the 3D craze over, it could not find a financier and was never made.

== Later career ==
Anthony's last acting role was in Treasure of the Four Crowns. He went on to occasionally produce films, such as Wild Orchid and the spaghetti-western throwback Dollar for the Dead, and ran an optical equipment company that he said sold an estimated $1 million worth of lenses up to the release of Jaws 3-D in 1983.

In late August 2009, Anthony announced he had taken the "over and under 3-D" format of Comin' At Ya! and converted it to "digital 3-D" as a part of the film's reissue. Following an exhibition at Fantastic Fest in Austin, Texas on September 25, 2011, the film was restored and digitalized for a 30th anniversary theatrical re-release and played in theaters throughout Texas starting on February 24, 2012.

== Filmography ==
| Year | Title | Role | Notes |
|---|---|---|---|
| 1959 | The Boy Who Owned a Melephant | —N/a | Producer and co-screenwriter |
| 1961 | Force of Impulse | Toby Marino | Also producer and story |
| 1962 | Without Each Other (also known as Pity Me Not) (never distributed) | Sam Lux | Also executive producer (uncredited) and co-story, co-screenwriter |
| 1964 | Engagement Italiano | Franco | Also executive producer (uncredited) |
| 1964 | Beautiful Families | Luigi | Segment: "La cernia" Also executive producer (uncredited) |
| 1965 | Let's Talk About Men | —N/a | Executive producer (uncredited) |
| 1965 | The Wounds of Hunger (theatrical release: 1967) | Luis Ortega | Also executive producer (uncredited) |
| 1967 | A Stranger in Town (also known as For a Dollar in the Teeth) | The Stranger | Also executive producer (uncredited) |
| 1967 | The Stranger Returns (also known as A Man, a Horse, a Gun, Shoot First... Laugh Last!) | The Stranger | Also executive producer (uncredited) and story |
| 1968 | The Silent Stranger (also known as The Horseman and the Samurai, The Stranger in Japan) (theatrical release: 1975) | The Stranger | Also producer and story |
| 1971 | Come Together | Tony | Also co-director (uncredited), producer, and screenwriter |
| 1971 | Blindman | Blindman | Also producer, screenwriter and story |
| 1973 | Pete, Pearl & the Pole (also known as 1931: Once Upon a Time in New York) | Pete Di Benedetto | Also producer and story |
| 1975 | Get Mean (also known as Beat a Dead Horse, Vengeance of the Barbarians, The Stranger Gets Mean) | The Stranger | Also producer and story |
| 1981 | Comin' at Ya! | H.H. Hart | Also producer and story (as Tony Pettito) |
| 1983 | Treasure of the Four Crowns | J.T. Striker | Also producer and story (as Tony Pettito) |
| 1989 | Wild Orchid | —N/a | Producer |
| 1989 | Honeymoon Academy | —N/a | Producer |
| 1998 | Dollar for the Dead | —N/a | Producer |
