= A Stranger in Town (1967 film) =

1967 film by Luigi Vanzi

- US film poster
- Directed by: Luigi Vanzi
- Screenplay by: Warren Garfield; John Mangione
- Produced by: Allen Klein; Roberto Infascelli; Massimo Gualdi
- Starring: Tony Anthony; Jolanda Modio; Gia Sandri; Frank Wolff
- Cinematography: Marcello Masciocchi
- Edited by: Mario Lucidi
- Music by: Benedetto Ghiglia
- Production companies: Primex Italiana; Taka Production Inc.
- Distributed by: Titanus (Italy); Metro-Goldwyn-Mayer (US)
- Release dates: 13 January 1967 (Italy); 24 April 1968 (US)
- Running time: 86 minutes
- Countries: Italy; United States
- Languages: Italian; English
- Budget: $190,000
- Box office: $1.5 million (US/Canada)

A Stranger in Town (Italian: Un dollaro tra i denti, lit. "A dollar between the teeth"), released in the UK as For a Dollar in the Teeth, is a 1967 Italian-American Spaghetti Western film directed by Luigi Vanzi.

The film is the first in a series of four western films starring Tony Anthony as "The Stranger". Released by MGM, it was a surprise box office hit in international markets.

== Plot ==
A blanket-clad gunfighter, the Stranger, rides into a largely deserted Mexican village, where he encounters Chica, a young widow with a baby son, and Paco, a bartender who orders him at knifepoint to leave. After killing Paco with a bottle, he witnesses a massacre of Captain Cordoba's Mexican Army troops by the bandit chief Aguilar and his gang, who steal the soldiers' uniforms and a machine gun. Dressed in a Union Army uniform, the Stranger greets Aguilar and his dominatrix right-hand woman, Maria "Maruka" Pilar, and informs them that an attachment of Union soldiers, led by Captain George Stafford, will soon be arriving to deliver two bags of gold coins to Captain Cordoba's troops. In return for identifying Aguilar as Cordoba to Stafford, the Stranger requests a share of the gold. The plan succeeds, despite Stafford's scepticism.

Preparing to leave, the Stranger demands a half-share of the gold from Aguilar, who refuses, giving him only a single coin for his troubles. The Stranger creates a diversion by shooting the candles of the saloon and steals the gold. Despite holding off Aguilar's men and escaping, he is forced to surrender the gold when they take Chica hostage. The Stranger later returns to recapture the gold, but he is ambushed and beaten by Aguilar's men, before being left to the attentions of Maruka, who becomes increasingly aroused by him. Eventually killing her by bashing her head against a stone floor, the Stranger distracts Aguilar and the gang by setting off an explosion, allowing him to steal the gold and save Chica, who has been abused by Aguilar.

After tending to his wounds, Chica gives the Stranger a shotgun and a sack of shells; he gives her several gold coins - hiding the remainder in a fountain - and advises her to leave town with her baby. Before she can do so, Aguilar and his men track her down and threaten to kill her baby so that she can reveal the location of the gold. The Stranger saves them by shooting one of the bandits, Marinero; in a prolonged battle, he eliminates the gang members one by one as they search for him throughout the town. Confronting and beating Aguilar, the Stranger kills him in a shotgun-versus-machine gun duel and places a gold coin between his teeth. Stafford's troops, aware of who the Stranger is, arrive to recover their gold; Stafford, whose real name is Ted Harrison, agrees to allow him to keep half of the gold as bounty for killing Aguilar's gang. Bidding "George" farewell, the Stranger is watched by Chica as he rides out of town.

== Cast ==
- Tony Anthony as The Stranger
- Frank Wolff (Frank Wolf) as Aguilar, the "Fair Man"
- Jolanda Modio (as Yolanda Modio) as Chica
- Gia Sandri as Maria "Maruka" Pilar
- Raf Baldassarre as Corvo
- Aldo Berti as Marinero
- Lars Bloch as Captain Ted Harrison/"George Stafford"
- Salvatore Puntillo as Priest
- Fortunato Arena as Captain Cordoba
- Giovanni Ivan Scratuglia (Ivan Scratt) as Aguilar Henchman

== Reception ==
In his one-star review of the film, Roger Ebert parodied westerns of the film's type with his description of a critic who did not want to think of the film after he saw it but had a hard time forgetting about it. His then-rival at the Chicago Tribune, Clifford Terry, said the film was "not exactly a prime candidate for the Welcome Wagon" and adding that Anthony "looks like Audie Murphy might look if he were old enough to not shave [...] perspires more than Louis Armstrong on an August night, apparently believes that cheroot smoking is hazardous to his health, and has the distracting characteristic of walking more like a hairdresser than a gunslinger."

Paul Mavis, of DVDTalk, reviewing the 2015 Warner Archive Collection DVD release of The Stranger Collection, wrote, "While they're not in the league of Leone (what is?), Anthony's grimy, sneaky little punk killer is an intriguing addition to the genre. Tony Anthony did some very interesting things with the spaghetti Western genre, including, perhaps, presaging the Trinity movies, while certainly "inventing" the West-meets-East subgenre."

In his analysis of the Spaghetti Western genre, Alex Cox was highly critical of the Stranger films, which he felt were "brain-dead" and had "nothing at all to recommend them", and of Anthony, who he described as an "unappealing" actor who was "talented at nothing beyond sticking around for sequels". Writing specifically about A Stranger in Town, Cox described the film as "entirely routine and derivative" of Sergio Leone's films and bemoaned the film's "tedious" pacing and "dull" violence. He felt that Frank Wolff, "a good actor of good guys", was miscast as Aguilar, finding Aldo Berti to be more convincingly villainous as Marinero. Cox also criticised the "inglorious" revelation of the Stranger as an army spy, the "endlessly repeated" score and the mostly "unimpressive" camerawork. However, he praised the contrasting use of light and dark in two scenes: a shootout lit only by gunshots, and Aguilar's gang revealing themselves to the Stranger by lighting matches.
