= List of Western films of the 1960s =

A list of Western films released in the 1960s.

Title	Director	Cast	Country	Subgenre/notes
1960
13 Fighting Men	Harry W. Gerstad	Grant Williams, Brad Dexter, Carole Mathews	United States	B Western
The Alamo	John Wayne	John Wayne, Richard Widmark, Laurence Harvey, Frankie Avalon, Patrick Wayne, Linda Cristal, Joan O'Brien, Chill Wills, Ken Curtis, Denver Pyle, Chuck Roberson, Guinn Williams, Richard Boone, "Big" John Hamilton	United States	Texas independence Western
Calibre 44	Julián Soler	Eulalio González, Rosita Quintana, Pedro Armendáriz	Mexico	charro Western
Cimarron	Anthony Mann	Glenn Ford, Maria Schell, Anne Baxter, Arthur O'Connell, Russ Tamblyn, Mercedes McCambridge, Charles McGraw, Harry Morgan, Edgar Buchanan	United States	traditional Western
Comanche Station	Budd Boetticher	Randolph Scott, Claude Akins, Nancy Gates, Skip Homeier, Richard Rust, Rand Brooks, Dyke Johnson	United States	traditional Western
Un dollaro di fifa	Giorgio Simonelli	Ugo Tognazzi, Walter Chiari, Mario Carotenuto, Hélène Chanel, Leonora Ruffo, Dominique Boschero	Italy	comedy
Five Guns to Tombstone	Edward L. Cahn	James Brown, John Wilder	United States	B Western
Flaming Star	Don Siegel	Elvis Presley, Barbara Eden, Steve Forrest, Dolores del Río, John McIntire, L.Q. Jones, Douglas Dick, Richard Jaeckel, Rodolfo Acosta, Karl Swenson	United States	traditional Western
For the Love of Mike	George Sherman	Richard Basehart	United States	family Western
Four Fast Guns	William J. Hole Jr.	James Craig, Martha Vickers, Edgar Buchanan	United States	B Western
Freckles	Andrew V. McLaglen	Martin West, Carol Christensen	United States	traditional Western
Gun Street	Edward L. Cahn	James Brown, Jean Willes	United States	B Western
Gunfighters of Abilene	Edward L. Cahn	Buster Crabbe, Barton MacLane	United States	B Western
Guns of the Timberland	Robert D. Webb	Alan Ladd, Jeanne Crain, Gilbert Roland, Frankie Avalon, Lyle Bettger, Noah Beery Jr., Verna Felton, Alana Ladd, Regis Toomey	United States	lumberjack Western
Hell Bent for Leather	George Sherman	Audie Murphy, Felicia Farr, Stephen McNally, Robert Middleton, Rad Fulton, John Qualen, Bob Steele	United States	B Western
Heller in Pink Tights	George Cukor	Sophia Loren, Anthony Quinn, Margaret O'Brien, Steve Forrest, Eileen Heckart	United States	traditional Western
Home from the Hill	Vincente Minnelli	Robert Mitchum, Eleanor Parker, George Peppard, George Hamilton, Everett Sloane, Luana Patten	United States	traditional Western
Juanito (a.k.a. Viva Juanito)	Fernando Palacios	Pablito Calvo, Georg Thomalla, Sabine Bethmann	Argentina	Euro-Western set in Mexico
The Magnificent Seven	John Sturges	Yul Brynner, Eli Wallach, Steve McQueen, Charles Bronson, Robert Vaughn, Brad Dexter, James Coburn, Horst Buchholz, Robert J. Wilke	United States	Western remake of The Seven Samurai
Markado (a.k.a. Branded)	Mario Barri	Fernando Poe Jr., Lyn D'Amour, Patricia Mijares, Mario Barri	Philippines	FilAm Western set in the Phil
Noose for a Gunman	Edward L. Cahn	Jim Davis, Lyn Thomas, Ted de Corsia	United States	B Western
North to Alaska	Henry Hathaway	John Wayne, Stewart Granger, Ernie Kovacs, Fabian, Capucine, Mickey Shaughnessy, Karl Swenson, Kathleen Freeman, John Qualen, Stanley Adams, Stephen Courtleigh, Lilyan Chauvin	United States	traditional Western set in Alaska
Oklahoma Territory	Edward L. Cahn	Bill Williams, Gloria Talbott	United States	B Western
One Foot in Hell	James B. Clark	Alan Ladd, Don Murray, Dan O'Herlihy, Dolores Michaels	United States	B Western
Sergeant Rutledge	John Ford	Woody Strode, Jeffrey Hunter, Constance Towers, Billie Burke	United States	cavalry Western
Seven Ways from Sundown	Harry Keller	Audie Murphy, Barry Sullivan, Venetia Stevenson, John McIntire, Kenneth Tobey, Mary Field, Don Collier, Jack Kruschen, Fred Graham	United States	tradational Western
The Slowest Gun in the West	Herschel Daugherty	Phil Silvers, Jack Benny	United States	Made for television movie
The Sundowners	Fred Zinnemann	Deborah Kerr, Robert Mitchum, Peter Ustinov	Australia; United States; United Kingdom	tradational Western
Ten Who Dared	William Beaudine	Brian Keith, John Beal, James Drury, R.G. Armstrong, Ben Johnson, L.Q. Jones, Dan Sheridan	United States	tradational Western
The Unforgiven	John Huston	Burt Lancaster, Audrey Hepburn, Audie Murphy, John Saxon, Charles Bickford, Lillian Gish, Albert Salmi, Doug McClure	United States	tradational Western
Valley of the Redwoods	William Witney	John Hudson, Lynette Bernay, Ed Nelson	United States	B Western
Walk Like a Dragon	James Clavell	Jack Lord, Nobu McCarthy, James Shigeta, Mel Tormé	United States	traditional Western
Walk Tall	Maury Dexter	Willard Parker, Joyce Meadows, Kent Taylor	United States	B Western
Young Jesse James	William F. Claxton	Willard Parker, Ray Stricklyn, Merry Anders	United States	B Western
1961
The Canadians	Burt Kennedy	Robert Ryan, John Dehner, Torin Thatcher	United Kingdom; Canada	Canadian Mountie Northern
The Comancheros	Michael Curtiz	John Wayne, Stuart Whitman, Ina Balin, Nehemiah Persoff, Lee Marvin, Michael Ansara, Bruce Cabot, Joan O'Brien, Jack Elam, Edgar Buchanan, Guinn "Big Boy" Williams, Patrick Wayne	United States	traditional Western
The Deadly Companions	Sam Peckinpah	Maureen O'Hara, Brian Keith, Steve Cochran, Chill Wills, Strother Martin, "Big" John Hamilton	United States	traditional Western
Dynamite Jack	Jean Bastia	Fernandel, Eleonora Vargas	France	French comedy Western
Escuela de Valientes	Julián Soler	Eulalio González, Rosita Quintana, Arturo Martínez	Mexico	Mexico Western
Frontier Uprising	Edward L. Cahn	Jim Davis, Nancy Hadley	United States	B Western remake of Kit Carson
The Gambler Wore a Gun	Edward L. Cahn	Jim Davis, Merry Anders	United States	B Western
Gold of the Seven Saints	Gordon Douglas	Clint Walker, Roger Moore, Robert Middleton, Chill Wills, Letícia Román	United States	traditional Western
Gun Fight	Edward L. Cahn	James Brown, Joan Staley	United States	B Western
Gunfight at Black Horse Canyon	R.G. Springsteen	Dale Robertson, Jack Ging, William Demarest, George Kennedy, Rod Cameron, Patricia Owens	United States	Made for television movie
The Hellions	Ken Annakin	Richard Todd, Jamie Uys, Anne Aubrey	United Kingdom; South Africa	traditional Western
The Hired Gun/The Last Gunfighter	Lindsay Shonteff	Don Borisenko, Tass Tory	Canada	Canadian Northern
The Horsemasters	William Fairchild	Tommy Kirk, Annette Funicello, Janet Munro, Donald Pleasence	United States	made for TV movie
The Last Sunset	Robert Aldrich	Rock Hudson, Kirk Douglas, Dorothy Malone, Joseph Cotten, Carol Lynley, Neville Brand, Regis Toomey, Rad Fulton, Adam Williams, Jack Elam, John Shay, José Chávez	United States	traditional Western
The Little Shepherd of Kingdom Come	Andrew V. McLaglen	Jimmie Rodgers, Luana Patten, Chill Wills	United States	traditional Western
The Long Rope	William Witney	Hugh Marlowe, Alan Hale Jr.	United States	B Western
I magnifici tre	Giorgio Simonelli	Walter Chiari, Ugo Tognazzi, Raimondo Vianello	Italy	comedy Western
The Man with the Hollow-Tip Bullets	Seijun Suzuki	Hideaki Nitani, Yôko Minamida	Japan	Japanese Western
Man with a Shotgun	Seijun Suzuki	Hideaki Nitani, Izumi Ashikawa	Japan	Japanese Western
The Misfits	John Huston	Clark Gable, Marilyn Monroe, Montgomery Clift	United States	traditional Western
Ole Rex	Robert Hinkle	Billy Hughes, Bill Coontz	United States	traditional Western
One-Eyed Jacks	Marlon Brando	Marlon Brando, Karl Malden, Ben Johnson, Katy Jurado, Slim Pickens, Elisha Cook Jr., Ray Teal, Hank Worden	United States	traditional Western
El Padre Pistolas	Julián Soler	Eulalio González, Christiane Martel, Carlos López Moctezuma	Mexico	comedy Western
The Plunderers	Joseph Pevney	Jeff Chandler, John Saxon	United States	traditional Western
Posse from Hell	Herbert Coleman	Audie Murphy, John Saxon, Zohra Lampert, Vic Morrow, Robert Keith, Rodolfo Acosta, Royal Dano, James Bell, Lee Van Cleef, Ray Teal	United States	B Western
The Purple Hills	Maury Dexter	Kent Taylor, Gene Nelson, Joanna Barnes, Russ Bender	United States	B Western
The Savage Guns	Michael Carreras	Richard Basehart, Don Taylor	United Kingdom; Spain	credited as the first spaghetti Western
The Second Time Around	Vincent Sherman	Debbie Reynolds, Steve Forrest, Andy Griffith, Juliet Prowse, Thelma Ritter, Ken Scott, Isobel Elsom, Rudolph Acosta, Timothy Carey, Tom Greenway, Eleanor Audley, Blossom Rock	United States	comedy Western
The Singer Not the Song	Roy Ward Baker	Dirk Bogarde, John Mills, Mylène Demongeot	United Kingdom	Euro-Western
The Taste of Violence	Robert Hossein	Robert Hossein, Giovanna Ralli	France; Italy; West Germany	French Western set in Mexico
A Thunder of Drums	Joseph M. Newman	Richard Boone, George Hamilton, Luana Patten, Arthur O'Connell, Charles Bronson, Richard Chamberlain, Duane Eddy, Slim Pickens	United States	cavalry Western
Two Rode Together	John Ford	James Stewart, Richard Widmark, Shirley Jones, Linda Cristal, Andy Devine, John McIntire, Harry Carey Jr., Ken Curtis, Jeanette Nolan, John Qualen, Woody Strode, "Big" John Hamilton	United States	traditional Western
Zorro the Avenger/La venganza del Zorro	Joaquín Luis Romero Marchent	Frank Latimore, María Luz Galicia, Rafael Romero Marchent	Spain	Mexico Western
1962
The Broken Land	John A. Bushelman	Kent Taylor, Diana Darrin, Jody McCrea	United States	B Western
Due contro tutti	Alberto De Martino, Antonio Momplet	Walter Chiari, Raimondo Vianello, Licia Calderón	Spain; Italy	paella Western comedy
The Firebrand	Maury Dexter	Kent Taylor, Valentin de Vargas, Lisa Montell	United States	historical Western
How the West Was Won	John Ford, Henry Hathaway, George Marshall, Richard Thorpe	Carroll Baker, Lee J. Cobb, Henry Fonda, Carolyn Jones, Karl Malden, Gregory Peck, George Peppard, Robert Preston, Debbie Reynolds, James Stewart, Eli Wallach, John Wayne, Richard Widmark, Walter Brennan, David Brian, Andy Devine, Russ Tamblyn, Raymond Massey, Agnes Moorehead, Harry Morgan, Thelma Ritter, Lee Van Cleef, Mickey Shaughnessy, Spencer Tracy	United States	epic Western in Cinerama
Lonely Are the Brave	David Miller	Kirk Douglas, Gena Rowlands, Walter Matthau, Michael Kane, George Kennedy, Carroll O'Connor, William Schallert	United States	contemporary Western
The Man Who Shot Liberty Valance	John Ford	John Wayne, James Stewart, Lee Marvin, Vera Miles, Edmond O'Brien, Andy Devine, Ken Murray, John Carradine, Jeanette Nolan, John Qualen, Woody Strode, Denver Pyle, Strother Martin, Lee Van Cleef, Shug Fisher	United States	traditional Western
Mekishiko mushuku	Koreyoshi Kurahara	Jô Shishido, Reiko Sasamori	Japan	Japanese Western shot in Mexico
Mooncussers	James Neilson	Lee Aaaker, Paul E. Burns, Robert Burton	United States	made for TV movie
An Occurrence at Owl Creek Bridge (a.k.a. La Rivière du hibou)	Robert Enrico	Roger Jacquet, Anne Cornaly, Anker Larsen	France	surreal Civil War Western short subject
Ride the High Country	Sam Peckinpah	Randolph Scott, Joel McCrea, Mariette Hartley, Ron Starr, Edgar Buchanan, R.G. Armstrong, Jenie Jackson, James Drury, L.Q. Jones, John Anderson, Warren Oates, John Davis Chandler	United States	traditional Western; final Randolph Scott Western
Rider on a Dead Horse	Herbert L. Strock	John Vivyan, Bruce Gordon, Lisa Lu	United States	B Western
Sergeants 3	John Sturges	Frank Sinatra, Dean Martin, Sammy Davis Jr., Peter Lawford, Joey Bishop	United States	Rat Pack Western remake of Gunga Din
Shades of Zorro (a.k.a. Cabalgando hacia la muerte)	Joaquín Luis Romero Marchent	Frank Latimore, María Luz Galicia, Paul Piaget	Spain; Italy; France	Mexico Western
Shoot Out at Big Sag	Roger Kay	Walter Brennan, Leif Erickson	United States	B Western
Six Black Horses	Harry Keller	Audie Murphy, Dan Duryea, Joan O'Brien, Roy Barcroft, Bob Steele	United States	B Western
Stagecoach to Dancers' Rock	Earl Bellamy	Warren Stevens, Martin Landau	United States	B Western
Terror at Black Falls	Richard C. Sarafian	Peter Mamakos House Peters Jr. Gary Gray	United States	B Western
Treasure of Silver Lake	Harald Reinl	Lex Barker, Herbert Lom	West Germany	Euro-Western
Wild Gals of the Naked West	Russ Meyer	Sammy Gilbert, Jackie Moran	United States	pornographic Western
The Wild Westerners	Oscar Rudolph	James Philbrook, Nancy Kovack, Duane Eddy, Guy Mitchell, Hugh Sanders, Elizabeth MacRae, Marshall Reed, Nestor Paiva, Harry Lauter, Bob Steele, Terry Frost, Don Harvey, Elizabeth Harrower	United States	traditional Western
Young Guns of Texas	Maury Dexter	James Mitchum, Alana Ladd, Jody McCrea, Gary Conway, Chill Wills, Robert Lowery	United States	traditional Western
1963
4 for Texas	Robert Aldrich	Frank Sinatra, Dean Martin, Anita Ekberg, Ursula Andress, Charles Bronson, Victor Buono, Richard Jaeckel, Jack Elam, the Three Stooges, Jack Lambert	United States	comedy Western
Apache Gold	Harald Reinl	Lex Barker, Pierre Brice	West Germany; Yugoslavia; Italy	Euro-Western
California	Hamil Petroff	Jock Mahoney, Faith Domergue	United States	traditional Western
Cattle King	Tay Garnett	Robert Taylor, Robert Loggia, Joan Caulfield, Robert Middleton, Larry Gates, Malcolm Atterbury, William Windom, Virginia Christine, Richard Devon, Ray Teal, Bob Ivers, Maggie Pierce, Woodrow Parfrey, John Mitchum	United States	ranchers vs settlers Western
Drylanders	Don Haldane	Frances Hyland, James B. Douglas	Canada	Canadian Northern
The Gun Hawk	Herbert L. Strock	Rory Calhoun, Edward Ludwig, Rod Cameron, Ruta Lee	United States	traditional Western
Gunfight at Comanche Creek	Frank McDonald	Audie Murphy, Ben Cooper, Colleen Miller, DeForest Kelley, John Hubbard, Adam Williams	United States	traditional Western
Gunfight at Red Sands	Ricardo Blasco	Richard Harrison	Spain; Italy	spaghetti Western
Hud	Martin Ritt	Paul Newman, Melvyn Douglas, Brandon deWilde, Patricia Neal	United States	contemporary Western
The Man from Galveston	William Conrad	Jeffrey Hunter, James Coburn, Preston Foster	United States	television pilot for Temple Houston
McLintock!	Andrew V. McLaglen	John Wayne, Maureen O'Hara, Patrick Wayne, Stefanie Powers, Jack Kruschen, Chill Wills, Yvonne De Carlo, Jerry Van Dyke, Edgar Buchanan, Perry Lopez, Strother Martin, Gordon Jones, Robert Lowery, Hank Worden, Michael Pate, Bruce Cabot, Edward Faulkner, Mari Blanchard, Leo Gordon, Chuck Roberson, "Big" John Hamilton	United States	comedy Western
The Pirates of the Mississippi	Jürgen Roland	Hansjörg Felmy, Brad Harris, Horst Frank	West Germany	Euro-Western
The Raiders	Herschel Daugherty	Brian Keith, Robert Culp, Judi Meredith, Jim McMullan, Alfred Ryder, Simon Oakland, Harry Carey Jr., Richard Deacon	United States	traditional Western
El sabor de la venganza/Gunfight at High Noon	Joaquín Luis Romero Marchent	Richard Harrison, Claudio Undari	Spain; Italy	traditional Western set in Mexico
Savage Sam	Norman Tokar	Brian Keith, Tommy Kirk, Kevin Corcoran	United States	traditional Western
Showdown	R.G. Springsteen	Audie Murphy, Kathleen Crowley, Charles Drake, Skip Homeier, L. Q. Jones, Strother Martin	United States	B Western
Tres hombres buenos	Joaquín Luis Romero Marchent	Geoffrey Horne	Spain	spaghetti Western
1964
Antes llega la muerte/The Seven from Texas	Joaquín Luis Romero Marchent	Paul Piaget, Robert Hundar, Gloria Milland, Fernando Sancho	Spain	
Apache Fury	José María Elorrieta	Frank Latimore, Jesús Puente	Spain; Italy	spaghetti Western
Apache Rifles	William Witney	Audie Murphy, L.Q. Jones	United States	cavalry Western
Aventuras del Oeste/Seven Hours of Gunfire	Joaquín Luis Romero Marchent	Rik Van Nutter, Gloria Milland	Spain; Italy	traditional Western
Ballad of a Gunfighter	Bill Ward	Marty Robbins, Joyce Redd	United States	
Blood on the Arrow	Sidney Salkow	Dale Robertson, Martha Hyer	United States	
Buffalo Bill, Hero of the Far West	Mario Costa as John W. Fordson	Gordon Scott, Mario Brega, Mirko Ellis	Italy	spaghetti Western
Bullet for a Badman	R.G. Springsteen	Audie Murphy, Darren McGavin, Ruta Lee, Beverley Owen, Skip Homeier, George Tobias, Alan Hale Jr., Ray Teal, Bob Steele	United States	B Western
Bullet in the Flesh	Marino Girolami	Rod Cameron, Patricia Viterbo, Ennio Girolami	Italy	spaghetti Western
Bullets Don't Argue	Mario Caiano	Rod Cameron, Ángel Aranda, Horst Frank	West Germany; Spain; Italy	spaghetti Western
Cheyenne Autumn	John Ford	Richard Widmark, Carroll Baker, James Stewart, Edward G. Robinson, Karl Malden, Sal Mineo, Dolores del Río, Ricardo Montalbán, Gilbert Roland, Arthur Kennedy, Patrick Wayne, Elizabeth Allen, John Carradine, Victor Jory, Ken Curtis, Jerry Gatlin	United States	revisionist Western
Circus World	Henry Hathaway	John Wayne, Claudia Cardinale, Rita Hayworth	United States	dramatic Western
Die for a Dollar in Tucson/Per un dollaro a Tucson si muore	Cesare Canevari	Ronny de Marc, Gisèle Sandré, Danilo Turk	Italy; Yugoslavia	Euro-Western
A Distant Trumpet	Raoul Walsh	Troy Donahue, Suzanne Pleshette, William Reynolds, James Gregory, Diane McBain, Claude Akins, Kent Smith	United States	cavalry Western
A Fistful of Dollars	Bob Robertson	Clint Eastwood, Marianne Koch, John Wells, W. Lukschy, S. Rupp, Joe Edgar, Antonio Prieto, José Calvo, Margherita Lozano, Daniel Martín, Benny Reeves, Richard Stuyvesant, Carol Brown, Aldo Sambreli, Raf Baldassarre, José Canalejas, Nino del Arco, Antonio Molino Rojo, Lorenzo Robledo, William R. Thompkins	Italy; West Germany; Spain	spaghetti Western
Freddy in the Wild West	Sobey Martin	Freddy Quinn, Beba Lončar, Rik Battaglia, Mamie Van Doren	West Germany; Yugoslavia	sauerkraut Western musical
Frontier Hellcat (a.k.a. Among Vultures)	Alfred Vohrer	Stewart Granger, Pierre Brice, Elke Sommer, Walter Barnes, Sieghardt Rupp, Terence Hill	West Germany; France	Euro-Western
Grand Canyon Massacre	Albert Band, Sergio Corbucci	James Mitchum, Milla Sannoner, George Ardisson	Italy	Euro-Western
Gunfighters of Casa Grande	Roy Rowland	Alex Nicol, Jorge Mistral, Steve Rowland, Dick Bentley, Phil Posner, Mercedes Alonso, Diana Lorys, Maria Granada, Roberto Rey, Aldo Sambrell	Spain; United States	Euro-Western
Gunmen of Rio Grande	Tulio Demicheli	Guy Madison, Madeleine Lebeau, Fernando Sancho	Italy	spaghetti Western
He Rides Tall	R.G. Springsteen	Tony Young, Dan Duryea, Jo Morrow, Madlyn Rhue, R.G. Armstrong, Mickey Simpson	United States	B Western
Invitation to a Gunfighter	Richard Wilson	Yul Brynner, Janice Rule, George Segal, Alfred Ryder, Clifford David, Brad Dexter, Pat Hingle, Bert Freed, Strother Martin, Clifton James	United States	
Last of the Renegades	Harald Reinl	Lex Barker, Pierre Brice, Anthony Steel, Karin Dor, Klaus Kinski, Terence Hill	West Germany	Euro-Western
The Last Ride to Santa Cruz	Rolf Olsen	Edmund Purdom, Mario Adorf, Marianne Koch, Klaus Kinski, Marisa Mell, Walter Giller, Thomas Fritsch, Sieghardt Rupp, Rainer Brandt, Rolf Olsen	West Germany; Austria	Euro-Western
Law of the Lawless	William F. Claxton	Dale Robertson, Yvonne De Carlo	United States	traditional Western
Lemonade Joe	Oldřich Lipský	Olga Schoberová	Czechoslovakia	satirical Western, Ostern
The Long Rifle and the Tomahawk	Sidney Salkow, Sam Newfield	John Hart, Lon Chaney Jr.	United States	feature made of two episodes of the 1957 Hawkeye and the Last of the Mohicans TV series
Mail Order Bride	Burt Kennedy	Buddy Ebsen, Keir Dullea, Warren Oates, Lois Nettleton, Barbara Luna, Paul Fix, Marie Windsor, Denver Pyle	United States	comedy Western
Man of the Cursed Valley	Siro Marcellini	Ty Hardin, Irán Eory	Italy; Spain	spaghetti Western
Massacre at Marble City	Paul Martin	Brad Harris, Horst Frank, Mario Adorf	West Germany	Euro-Western
Old Shatterhand	Hugo Fregonese	Lex Barker, Pierre Brice, Daliah Lavi	West Germany; Yugoslavia	Euro-Western
The Outrage	Martin Ritt	Edward G. Robinson, Paul Newman, William Shatner, Laurence Harvey, Claire Bloom, Howard Da Silva, Albert Salmi, Thomas Chalmers, Paul Fix	United States	dramatic Western (adapted from Kurosawa's Rashomon)
The Quick Gun	Sidney Salkow	Audie Murphy, Merry Anders, James Best, Ted de Corsia, Walter Sande, Rex Holman, Charles Meredith, Frank Ferguson, Mort Mills, Gregg Palmer	United States	traditional Western
Rio Conchos	Gordon Douglas	Richard Boone, Stuart Whitman, Tony Franciosa, Edmond O'Brien, Jim Brown, Wende Wagner, Warner Anderson, Rodolfo Acosta, Barry Kelley, Vito Scotti	United States	traditional Western set in Mexico
Stage to Thunder Rock	William F. Claxton	Barry Sullivan, Marilyn Maxwell, Scott Brady, Lon Chaney Jr., Anne Seymour, John Agar, Wanda Hendrix, Keenan Wynn, Robert Lowery	United States	B Western
Taggart	R.G. Springsteen	Tony Young, Dan Duryea, David Carradine, Dick Foran, Elsa Cárdenas, Jean Hale, Ray Teal	United States	B Western
Tres dólares de plomo	Pino Mercanti	Fred Beir, Francisco Nieto	Italy; Spain	spaghetti Western
Two Mafiamen in the Far West	Giorgio Simonelli	Franco and Ciccio	Italy	comedy spaghetti Western
The Unsinkable Molly Brown	Charles Walters	Debbie Reynolds, Harve Presnell, Ed Begley, Jack Kruschen, Hermione Baddeley, Vassili Lambrinos, Martita Hunt, Harvey Lembeck, Maria Karnilova, Audrey Christie	United States	musical Western
Vengeance	Dene Hilyard	William Thourlby, Melora Conway, Owen Pavitt	United States	B Western
1965
$100,000 for Ringo	Alberto De Martino	Richard Harrison, Fernando Sancho, Luis Induni	Spain; Italy	spaghetti Western
Adiós Gringo	Giorgio Stegani	Giuliano Gemma, Ida Galli		spaghetti Western
Ang Mananandata	Armando A. Herrera	Fernando Poe Jr., Barbara Perez	Philippines	Phil Western
Arizona Raiders	William Witney	Audie Murphy, Michael Dante, Ben Cooper, Buster Crabbe, Gloria Talbott, Ray Stricklyn, George Keymas, Fred Krone, Red Morgan, Fred Graham	United States	B Western
Assault on Fort Texan	Alberto De Martino	Edmund Purdom, Paul Piaget, Ida Galli	Spain; Italy	spaghetti Western
Behind the Mask of Zorro	Ricardo Blasco	Tony Russel, María José Alfons, Jesús Puente	Spain; Italy	Euro-Western
Black Spurs	R.G. Springsteen	Rory Calhoun, Linda Darnell, Terry Moore, Scott Brady, Lon Chaney Jr., Richard Arlen, Bruce Cabot, Patricia Owens, James Best, Jerome Courtland, DeForest Kelley, James Brown, Robert Carricart, Chuck Roberson	United States	B Western
Blood for a Silver Dollar	Giorgio Ferroni	Giuliano Gemma, Ida Galli	Italy	spaghetti Western
The Bounty Killer	Spencer Gordon Bennet	Dan Duryea, Rod Cameron	United States	B Western
Carry On Cowboy	Gerald Thomas	Sidney James, Kenneth Williams, Jim Dale, Charles Hawtrey, Joan Sims, Angela Douglas	United Kingdom	comedy Western
Cat Ballou	Elliot Silverstein	Jane Fonda, Lee Marvin, Michael Callan, Dwayne Hickman, Nat King Cole, Stubby Kaye, Tom Nardini, John Marley, Jay C. Flippen, Arthur Hunnicutt, Bruce Cabot	United States	musical/comedy Western
Convict Stage	Lesley Selander	Harry Lauter, Don "Red" Barry	United States	B Western
Duel at Sundown	Leopold Lahola	Peter van Eyck, Carole Gray, Terence Hill	Italy; West Germany	Euro-Western
Fall of the Mohicans	Mateo Cano	Jack Taylor, Paul Muller	Italy; Spain	Spanish version of The Last of the Mohicans
Finger on the Trigger	Sidney W. Pink	Rory Calhoun, Aldo Sambrell, James Philbrook, Leo Anchóriz, Todd Martin, Jorge Rigaud, Silvia Solar, Bruce Talbot, Axel Anderson, John Clarke, Tito García, Yvonne Gilbert, Antonio Molino Rojo	Spain	paella Western
Five Thousand Dollars on One Ace	Alfonso Balcázar	Robert Woods, Fernando Sancho	Spain; Italy; West Germany	spaghetti Western
For a Few Dollars More	Sergio Leone	Clint Eastwood, Lee Van Cleef, Gian Maria Volonté, Klaus Kinski, Mario Brega, Luigi Pistilli, Aldo Sambrell, Benito Stefanelli, Joseph Egger, Lorenzo Robledo, Panos Papadopulos, Robert Camardiel, Tomás Blanco, Werner Abrolat, Joseph Bradley, Frank Braña, José Canalejas, Rosemary Dexter, Peter Lee Lawrence, Antonio Molino Rojo, Ricardo Palacios, Mara Krupp	Italy; West Germany	spaghetti Western remake of Yojimbo
For a Fist in the Eye	Michele Lupo	Franco and Ciccio, Mónica Randall	Italy	spaghetti Western comedy
Fort Courageous	Lesley Selander	Fred Beir, Don "Red" Barry	United States	B Western
The Glory Guys	Arnold Laven	Tom Tryon, Michael Anderson Jr., James Caan, Harve Presnell, Senta Berger, Slim Pickens, Erik Holland, Adam Williams, Andrew Duggan, Peter Breck, Jeanne Cooper, Michael Forest	United States	cavalry Western
Gold Train	Gianfranco Baldanello	Carl Möhner, Alessandra Panaro, Ivano Staccioli	United States	Italy
The Great Sioux Massacre	Sidney Salkow	Joseph Cotten, Darren McGavin, Philip Carey, Julie Sommars, Nancy Kovack, Michael Pate, Frank Ferguson, Stacy Harris, Iron Eyes Cody, Boyd Morgan	cavalry historical Western	Italy
Guns of Nevada	Ignacio F. Iquino	George Martin, Adriana Ambesi, Miguel de la Riva	Spain; Italy	spaghetti Western
The Hallelujah Trail	John Sturges	Burt Lancaster, Lee Remick, Jim Hutton, Pamela Tiffin, Donald Pleasence, Brian Keith, Martin Landau, John Anderson, Robert J. Wilke, Dub Taylor, Whit Bissell, Helen Kleeb, Ted Markland, Jerry Gatlin	United States	comedy Western
Hands of a Gunfighter	Rafael Romero Marchent	Craig Hill, Gloria Milland, Piero Lulli	Spain; Italy	spaghetti Western
In a Colt's Shadow	Giovanni Grimaldi	Stephen Forsyth, Conrado San Martín, Helga Liné	Spain; Italy	spaghetti Western
Indian Paint	Norman Foster	Johnny Crawford, Jay Silverheels	United States	B Western
Jesse James' Kid/Solo contro tutti	Antonio del Amo	Robert Hundar, Mercedes Alonso, Adrian Hoven	Spain; Italy	spaghetti Western
The Last Tomahawk	Harald Reinl	Anthony Steffen, Karin Dor, Joachim Fuchsberger	West Germany; Italy; Spain	German version of The Last of the Mohicans set in the post Civil War West
Left Handed Johnny West	Gianfranco Parolini	Mimmo Palmara, Mara Cruz	Italy	spaghetti Western
Legacy of the Incas	Georg Marischka	Guy Madison, Rik Battaglia, Fernando Rey	Spain; Italy; West Germany	
Major Dundee	Sam Peckinpah	Charlton Heston, Richard Harris, Jim Hutton, James Coburn, Michael Anderson Jr., Senta Berger, Mario Adorf, Brock Peters, Warren Oates, Ben Johnson, R.G. Armstrong, L.Q. Jones, Slim Pickens, Dub Taylor, John Davis Chandler, Karl Swenson, Michael Pate, José Carlos Ruiz, Aurora Clavel, Enrique Lucero	United States	cavalry Western
The Man from Button Willow	David Detiege	Dale Robertson (voice), Edgar Buchanan (voice), Barbara Jean Wong (voice), Howard Keel (voice)	United States	animated Western
Man of the Cursed Valley	Siro Marcellini, Primo Zeglio	Ty Hardin, Irán Eory	Spain; Italy	spaghetti Western
Minnesota Clay	Sergio Corbucci	Cameron Mitchell, Georges Riviere, Ethel Rojo, Diana Martín, Anthony Ross, Fernando Sancho, Antonio Casas, Gino Pernice, Joe Kamel	Italy	spaghetti Western
La muerte cumple condena/$100,000 for Lassiter	Joaquín Luis Romero Marchent	Claudio Undari, Pamela Tudor	Spain	spaghetti Western
Murrieta	George Sherman	Jeffrey Hunter, Diana Lorys, Arthur Kennedy	Spain; Italy	historical Western
Ocaso de un pistolero	Rafael Romero Marchent	Craig Hill, Gloria Milland	Spain	spaghetti Western
Oklahoma John	Jaime Jesús Balcazar	Rick Horn, José Calvo	Spain	spaghetti Western
Old Surehand	Alfred Vohrer	Stewart Granger, Pierre Brice, Larry Pennell	West Germany; Yugoslavia	Euro-Western
The Outlaws Is Coming	Norman Maurer	Moe Howard, Larry Fine, Curly Joe DeRita, Nancy Kovack	United States	comedy Western
Peace for a Gunfighter	Raymond Boley	Mark Anthony, Burt Berger	United States	B Western
A Pistol for Ringo	Duccio Tessari	Giuliano Gemma	Italy; Spain	spaghetti Western
The Pyramid of the Sun God	Robert Siodmak	Lex Barker, Gérard Barray, Michèle Girardon	West Germany; Italy	Euro-Western
Rampage at Apache Wells	Harald Philipp	Stewart Granger, Pierre Brice, Harald Leipnitz, Macha Méril, Terence Hill, Walt Barnes	West Germany; Yugoslavia	Euro-Western
Requiem for a Gunfighter	Spencer Gordon Bennet	Rod Cameron, Stephen McNally, Mike Mazurki	United States	traditional Western
The Return of Ringo	Duccio Tessari	Giuliano Gemma	Italy; Spain	spaghetti Western
The Reward	Serge Bourguignon	Max von Sydow, Yvette Mimieux, Efrem Zimbalist Jr., Gilbert Roland, Henry Silva, Emilio Fernández	United States	traditional Western
The Rounders	Burt Kennedy	Glenn Ford, Henry Fonda, Sue Ane Langdon, Hope Holiday, Chill Wills, Edgar Buchanan, Kathleen Freeman, Joan Freeman, Denver Pyle, Barton MacLane, Casey Tibbs	United States	contemporary comedy Western
Shenandoah	Andrew V. McLaglen	James Stewart, Doug McClure, Glenn Corbett, Patrick Wayne, Rosemary Forsyth, Phillip Alford, Katharine Ross, Rosemary Forsyth, James McMullan, Paul Fix, Denver Pyle, George Kennedy, James Best, Harry Carey Jr., Strother Martin	United States	Civil War Western
Sheriff Won't Shoot	José Luis Monter, Renato Polselli	Mickey Hargitay, Vincenzo Cascino	Spain; Italy	spaghetti Western
Shoot to Kill	Ramón Torrado	Edmund Purdom, Frank Latimore, Fernando Sancho	Spain	spaghetti Western
Son of a Gunfighter	Paul Landres	Russ Tamblyn, Kieron Moore, Fernando Rey, James Philbrook, María Granada, Aldo Sambrell, Antonio Casas, Barta Barri, Ralph Browne	Spain; United States	spaghetti Western
The Sons of Katie Elder	Henry Hathaway	John Wayne, Dean Martin, Martha Hyer, Michael Anderson Jr., Earl Holliman, Jeremy Slate, James Gregory, Paul Fix, George Kennedy, Dennis Hopper, John Litel, John Doucette, James Westerfield, John Qualen, Rodolfo Acosta, Strother Martin, Jerry Gatlin	United States	traditional Western
Stranger in Sacramento	Sergio Bergonzelli	Mickey Hargitay, Enrico Bomba, Mario Lanfranchi	Italy	spaghetti Western
Sunscorched	Jaime Jesús Balcazar, Mark Stevens	Mark Stevens, Mario Adorf, Marianne Koch	Spain; West Germany	spaghetti Western
Town Tamer	Lesley Selander	Dana Andrews, Terry Moore, Pat O'Brien, Lon Chaney Jr., Bruce Cabot, Lyle Bettger, Richard Arlen, Barton MacLane, Richard Jaeckel, Philip Carey, Sonny Tufts, Coleen Gray, DeForest Kelley, Don "Red" Barry, James Brown, Richard Webb, Bob Steele	United States	B Western
The Tramplers	Albert Band, Mario Sequi	Gordon Scott, Joseph Cotten	Italy; France	Euro-Western
The Treasure of the Aztecs	Robert Siodmak	Lex Barker, Gérard Barray, Michèle Girardon	West Germany; Italy	Euro-Western
Viva Carrancho	Alfonso Balcázar	Fernando Sancho, Luis Dávila	Spain	Mexican Western
Viva Maria!	Louis Malle	Brigitte Bardot, Jeanne Moreau	France; Italy	Euro-Western
War Party	Lesley Selander	Michel T. Mikler, Davey Davison, Don "Red" Barry	United States	B Western
West and Soda	Bruno Bozzetto	none	Italy	animated comedy Western
Winnetou: The Desperado Trail	Harald Reinl	Lex Barker, Pierre Brice	West Germany	Euro-Western
Young Fury	Christian Nyby	Rory Calhoun, Virginia Mayo, William Bendix, Lon Chaney Jr., Richard Arlen, John Agar, Jody McCrea, Merry Anders, Marc Cavell	United States	B Western
1966
Alvarez Kelly	Edward Dmytryk	William Holden, Richard Widmark, Janice Rule, Patrick O'Neal, Victoria Shaw, Roger C. Carmel, Richard Rust, Arthur Franz, Don "Red" Barry, Harry Carey Jr., Barry Atwater	United States	Civil War Western
And Now Miguel	James B. Clark	Pat Cardi, Michael Ansara, Guy Stockwell, Clu Gulager	United States	traditional Western
An Eye for an Eye	Michael D. Moore	Robert Lansing, Patrick Wayne, Slim Pickens, Gloria Talbott, Paul Fix, Strother Martin, Henry Wills, Rance Howard, Jerry Gatlin	United States	traditional Western
Apache Uprising	R.G. Springsteen	Rory Calhoun, Corinne Calvet, John Russell, Lon Chaney Jr., Gene Evans, Richard Arlen, Arthur Hunnicutt, DeForest Kelley, George Chandler, Jean Parker, Johnny Mack Brown, Don "Red" Barry, Robert Carricart, Roy Jenson	United States	traditional Western
The Appaloosa	Sidney J. Furie	Marlon Brando, Anjanette Comer, John Saxon, Emilio Fernández, Alex Montoya, Míriam Colón, Rafael Campos, Frank Silvera, Larry D. Mann	Italy	spaghetti Western
Arizona Colt	Michele Lupo	Giuliano Gemma	Italy	spaghetti Western
El aventuroa de las Guaynas/The Tough One	Joaquín Luis Romero Marchent	Luis Barboo, Chiro Bermejo	Spain	
Ballad of a Gunman/Pistoleros	Alfio Caltabiano	Antony Guidra, Angelo Infanti	Italy	spaghetti Western
The Big Gundown	Sergio Sollima	Lee Van Cleef, Tomas Milian, Walter Barnes, Nieves Navarro, Gérard Herter, Fernando Sancho, Ángel del Pozo, Benito Stefanelli, Antonio Molino Rojo, Lorenzo Robledo	Italy	spaghetti Western
A Big Hand for the Little Lady	Fielder Cook	Henry Fonda, Joanne Woodward, Jason Robards, Paul Ford, Charles Bickford, Burgess Meredith, Kevin McCarthy, Robert Middleton, John Qualen, Percy Helton, Gerald Michenaud, Virginia Gregg, James Griffith	United States	comedy Western
Billy the Kid vs. Dracula	William Beaudine	John Carradine, Chuck Courtney	United States	horror Western
The Brute and the Beast	Lucio Fulci	Franco Nero, George Hilton	Italy	spaghetti Western
Carry On Cowboy	Gerald Thomas	Sid James, Jim Dale, Joan Sims, Angela Douglas, Kenneth Williams	United Kingdom	comedy Western
Cuatro dólares de venganza	Jaime Jesús Balcazar	Robert Woods, Dana Ghia	Italy	spaghetti Western
Degueyo	Giuseppe Vari	Giacomo Rossi-Stuart, Dan Vadis	Spain	spaghetti Western
Dinamita Jim	Alfonso Balcázar	Luis Dávila, Fernando Sancho, Rosalba Neri	Spain	spaghetti Western
Django	Sergio Corbucci	Franco Nero	Italy	spaghetti Western
Doc, manos de plata	Alfonso Balcázar	Carl Möhner, Luis Dávila, Fernando Sancho, Gloria Milland	Spain; Italy; France	spaghetti Western
Dollar of Fire/Epitaph for a Fast Gun	Nick Nostro	Gaspar 'Indio' González, Dada Gallotti, Miguel de la Riva	Spain; Italy	spaghetti Western
Dos pistolas gemelas/Sharp-Shooting Twin Sisters	Rafael Romero Marchent	Sean Flynn, Pili and Mili	Spain	paella Western
Duel at Diablo	Ralph Nelson	James Garner, Sidney Poitier, Bibi Andersson, Dennis Weaver, Bill Travers, Alf Elson, John Hubbard, John Hoyt, William Redfield, Bill Hart, Eddie Little Sky, John Crawford, Jeff Cooper, Ralph Bahnsen	United States	traditional Western
El Dorado	Howard Hawks	John Wayne, Robert Mitchum, James Caan, Charlene Holt, Paul Fix, Arthur Hunnicutt, Michele Carey, R. G. Armstrong, Ed Asner, Christopher George, Robert Donner, Johnny Crawford, Jim Davis, John Mitchum, Chuck Roberson, Don Collier	United States	traditional Western
For a Few Dollars Less	Mario Mattoli	Lando Buzzanca, Raimondo Vianello, Gloria Paul	Italy	spaghetti Western comedy
For One Thousand Dollars Per Day	Silvio Amadio	Zachary Hatcher, Mimmo Palmara, Pier Angeli	Italy; Spain	spaghetti Western
Geronimo und die Räuber	Arthur Maria Rabenalt	Hubert Suschka	West Germany	Euro-Western
The Good, the Bad and the Ugly	Sergio Leone	Clint Eastwood, Eli Wallach, Lee Van Cleef, Aldo Giuffrè, Mario Brega, Luigi Pistilli, Al Mulock, Antonio Casas, Antonio Casale, Antonio Molino Rojo, Rada Rassimov	Italy; Spain	spaghetti Western
Gunpoint	Earl Bellamy	Audie Murphy, Joan Staley, Warren Stevens	United States	traditional Western
The Hills Run Red	Carlo Lizzani	Thomas Hunter, Henry Silva, Dan Duryea, Nando Gazzolo, Nicoletta Machiavelli, Gianna Serra, Loris Loddi, Geoffrey Copleston, Guido Celano, Puccio Ceccarelli, Guglielmo Spoletini, Mirko Valentin, Jeff Cameron	Italy	spaghetti Western
Incident at Phantom Hill	Earl Bellamy	Robert Fuller, Jocelyn Lane, Dan Duryea, Tom Simcox, Linden Chiles, Claude Akins, Noah Beery Jr., Paul Fix, Denver Pyle, Don Collier	United States	Civil War Western
Jesse James Meets Frankenstein's Daughter	William Beaudine	John Lupton, Narda Onyx	United States	horror Western
Johnny Oro (a.k.a. Ringo and His Golden Pistol)	Sergio Corbucci	Mark Damon	Italy	spaghetti Western
Johnny Reno	R.G. Springsteen	Dana Andrews, Jane Russell, Lon Chaney Jr., John Agar, Lyle Bettger, Tom Drake, Richard Arlen, Robert Lowery	United States	B Western
Kid Rodelo	Richard Carlson	Don Murray, Janet Leigh, Broderick Crawford	United States; Spain	traditional Western
Mutiny at Fort Sharpe	Fernando Cerchio	Broderick Crawford, Elisa Montés	Italy; Spain	Euro-Western
Navajo Joe	Sergio Corbucci	Burt Reynolds, Aldo Sanbrell, Nicoletta Machiavelli, Fernando Rey, Tanya Lopert, Franca Polesello, Lucia Modugno, Peter Cross, Roberto Paoletti, Nino Imparato, Valeria Sabel, Mario Lanfranchi, Angel Alvarez, Lorenzo Robledo, Álvaro de Luna, Valentino Macchi, Cris Huerta, Dianick	Italy	spaghetti Western
Nevada Smith	Henry Hathaway	Steve McQueen, Karl Malden, Brian Keith, Arthur Kennedy, Suzanne Pleshette, Martin Landau, Raf Vallone, Janet Margolin, Pat Hingle, Howard Da Silva, Paul Fix, Iron Eyes Cody, Josephine Hutchinson, Jerry Gatlin	United States	psychological Western
The Night of the Grizzly	Joseph Pevney	Clint Walker, Keenan Wynn, Martha Hyer, Nancy Kulp, Kevin Brodie, Ellen Corby, Jack Elam, Leo Gordon, Candy Moore, Victoria Paige Meyerink	United States	grizzly bear vs rancher's family
Not for Hire	Mike Caguin	Jun Aristorenas, Divina Valencia, Eddie Garcia	Philippines	Phil Western
The Plainsman	David Lowell Rich	Don Murray, Guy Stockwell, Abby Dalton, Henry Silva, Simon Oakland, Leslie Nielsen, Emily Banks, Terry Wilson	United States	
The Professionals	Richard Brooks	Lee Marvin, Burt Lancaster, Robert Ryan, Woody Strode, Claudia Cardinale, Jack Palance, Ralph Bellamy, Joe De Santis	United States	action/adventure Western
The Rare Breed	Andrew V. McLaglen	James Stewart, Maureen O'Hara, Brian Keith, Juliet Mills, Don Galloway, David Brian, Jack Elam, Ben Johnson, Harry Carey Jr., Barbara Werle	United States	dramatic Western
Return of the Seven	Burt Kennedy	Yul Brynner, Robert Fuller, Warren Oates, Claude Akins, Julián Mateos, Virgílio Teixeira, Jordan Christopher, Elisa Montés, Fernando Rey, Emilio Fernández, Rodolfo Acosta	United States	traditional Western shot in Spain
Ride Beyond Vengeance	Bernard McEveety	Chuck Connors, Michael Rennie, Joan Blondell, Kathryn Hays, Claude Akins, Gloria Grahame, Gary Merrill, Bill Bixby, Paul Fix, William Bryant, Jamie Farr, Robert Q. Lewis, James MacArthur, Arthur O'Connell	United States	B Western
Ride in the Whirlwind	Monte Hellman	Jack Nicholson, Cameron Mitchell, Millie Perkins, Harry Dean Stanton	United States	acid Western
Scalplock	James Goldstone	Dale Robertson, Sandra Smith, Diana Hyland, Todd Armstrong, James Westerfield, Bob Random, John Anderson, Lloyd Bochner, David Sheiner, Woodrow Parfrey, Roger Torrey, Eddie Firestone, Paul Sorensen, Jerry Gatlin	United States	television movie/television pilot for The Iron Horse
Seven Dollars on the Red	Alberto Cardone	Anthony Steffen, Elisa Montés, Fernando Sancho	Italy	spaghetti Western
Seven Vengeful Women	Rudolf Zehetgruber, Sidney W. Pink	Anne Baxter, Maria Perschy, Gustavo Rojo	Italy; Spain; Austria; Liechtenstein	spaghetti Western
The Shooting	Monte Hellman	Jack Nicholson, Warren Oates, Will Hutchins, Millie Perkins	United States	acid Western
The Sons of the Great Bear	Josef Mach	Gojko Mitić	East Germany	red/revisionist Western
Stagecoach	Gordon Douglas	Ann-Margret, Red Buttons, Michael Connors, Alex Cord, Bing Crosby, Bob Cummings, Van Heflin, Slim Pickens, Stefanie Powers, Keenan Wynn, Norman Rockwell	United States	traditional Western remake of Stagecoach
Taste for Killing	Tonino Valerii	Craig Hill, George Martin	Italy; Spain	spaghetti Western
Texas Across the River	Michael Gordon	Dean Martin, Alain Delon, Rosemary Forsyth, Joey Bishop, Peter Graves, Michael Ansara, Andrew Prine, Richard Farnsworth	United States	comedy Western
Texas, Adios	Ferdinando Baldi	Franco Nero	Italy	spaghetti Western
The Texican	Lesley Selander	Audie Murphy, Broderick Crawford, Diana Lorys, Luz Márquez, Anthony Casas, Antonio Molino Rojo, Aldo Sambrell, John Peral, Helga Genth, George Rigaud, Luis Induni, Marta May, Víctor Vilanova, Gérard Tichy, Emilio Rodríguez, Frank Braña, Carlos Hurtado, Víctor Israel, César Ojinaga, Vicente Soler, Juan Torres, Santiago Rivero, Manuel Quintana, Carlos Miguel Solá, Angel Lombardi, Oscar Del Campo	Spain	paella Western remake of Panhandle
Three Bullets for Ringo	Emimmo Salvi	Franco and Ciccio	Italy	spaghetti Western comedy
Thunder at the Border	Alfred Vohrer	Rod Cameron, Pierre Brice	West Germany; Yugoslavia	Euro-Western
The Trap	Sidney Hayers	Oliver Reed, Rita Tushingham	Canada; United Kingdom	Canadian Western
Two Sons of Ringo	Giorgio Simonelli	Mickey Hargitay, Gordon Mitchell	Italy	spaghetti Western
The Ugly Ones	Eugenio Martín	Tomas Milian, Richard Wyler	Italy; Spain	spaghetti Western
Waco	R.G. Springsteen	Howard Keel, Jane Russell, Brian Donlevy, Wendell Corey, John Smith, Terry Moore, John Agar, Gene Evans, Richard Arlen, Ben Cooper, DeForest Kelley, Robert Lowery, Jeff Richards, Boyd Morgan	United States	B Western
Winnetou and the Crossbreed	Harald Philipp	Lex Barker, Pierre Brice	West Germany; Italy; Yugoslavia	Euro-Western
Yankee	Tinto Brass	Philippe Leroy, Adolfo Celi	Italy; Spain	spaghetti Western
1967
40 Guns to Apache Pass	William Witney	Audie Murphy, Michael Burns, Kenneth Tobey, Laraine Stephens, Robert Brubaker, Michael Blodgett, Michael Keep, Kay Stewart, Kenneth MacDonald, Byron Morrow, Ted Gehring	United States	B Western
The Adventures of Bullwhip Griffin	James Neilson	Roddy McDowall, Suzanne Pleshette, Bryan Russell, Karl Malden, Richard Haydn, Alan Carney, Arthur Hunnicutt, Dub Taylor, Pedro Gonzalez Gonzalez, John Qualen	United States	comedy Western
Any Gun Can Play	Enzo G. Castellari	Gilbert Roland, Edd Byrnes, George Hilton	Italy	spaghetti Western
The Ballad of Josie	Andrew McLaglen	Doris Day, Peter Graves, George Kennedy, Andy Devine, William Talman, David Hartman, Guy Raymond, Timothy Scott, Don Stroud, Paul Fix, Harry Carey Jr., Robert Lowery	United States	comedy Western
The Bandits	Robert Conrad, Alfredo Zacarías	Robert Conrad, Roy Jenson, Jan-Michael Vincent	Mexico	Mexican Western
Bang Bang Kid	Giorgio Gentili, Luciano Lelli	Tom Bosley, Guy Madison, Sandra Milo	Italy	comedy spaghetti Western
A Bullet for the General	Damiano Damiani	Gian Maria Volonté, Klaus Kinski, Martine Beswick, Lou Castel, William Berger, Jaime Fernández, Andrea Checchi, Aldo Sambrell, José Manuel Martín, Santiago Santos, Valentino Macchi, Guy Heron, Carla Gravina, Antoñito Ruiz, Sal Borgese, Damiano Damiani, Aysanoa Runachagua	Italy	spaghetti Western
Chingachgook, die große Schlange	Richard Groschopp	Gojko Mitić Rolf Römer	East Germany	Ostern based on James Fenimore Cooper's The Deerslayer
Chuka	Gordon Douglas	Rod Taylor, Ernest Borgnine, John Mills, Luciana Paluzzi, James Whitmore, Victoria Vetri, Louis Hayward, Hugh Reilly, Joseph Sirola	United States	traditional Western
Cjamango	Edoardo Mulargia	Ivan Rassimov, Hélène Chanel, Mickey Hargitay	Italy	spaghetti Western
Clint, el solitario	Alfonso Balcázar	George Martin, Marianne Koch, Fernando Sancho	Spain	gazpacho Western
Custer of the West	Robert Siodmak	Robert Shaw, Mary Ure, Ty Hardin, Jeffrey Hunter, Lawrence Tierney, Robert Ryan	United States	
Da Best in Da West	Romy Villaflor	Dolphy, Divina Valencia, Panchito, Rod Navarro, Dolphy Jr, Bayani Casimiro, Georgie Quizon, Marissa Delgado, Gina Stuart	Philippines	Phil Western
Day of Anger	Tonino Valerii	Lee Van Cleef, Giuliano Gemma, Walter Rilla, Andrea Bosic, Al Mulock, Lukas Ammann, Anna Orso, Ennio Balbo, Pepe Calvo, Christa Linder, Giorgio Gargiullo, Yvonne Sanson, Benito Stefanelli, Franco Balducci, Romano Puppo, Vladimir Medar, Ricardo Palacios, Nazzareno Natale, Román Ariznavarreta, Fulvio Mingozzi, Hans Otto Alberty	Italy	spaghetti Western
Death Rides a Horse	Giulio Petroni	Lee Van Cleef, John Phillip Law, Luigi Pistilli, Mario Brega, Anthony Dawson, Jose Torres, Franco Balducci, Bruno Corazzari, Felicita Fanny, Ignazio Leone, Carlo Pisacane, Nazzareno Natale, Romano Puppo, Richard Watson, Archie Savage, Carla Cassola, Nerina Montagnani, Nino Vingelli, Remo Capitani, José Terrón, Jeff Cameron	Italy	spaghetti Western
Django, Kill... If You Live, Shoot!	Giulio Questi	Tomas Milian, Ray Lovelock	Italy	spaghetti Western
Dos cruces en Danger Pass	Rafael Romero Marchent	Pietro Martellanza, Mario Novelli	Spain	Euro-Western
The Elusive Avengers	Edmond Keosayan	Viktor Kosykh, Mikhail Metyolkin, Vasili Vasilyev	Soviet Union	Ostern
Face to Face	Sergio Sollima	Gian Maria Volonté, Tomas Milian, William Berger, Jolanda Modio, Carole André, Gianni Rizzo, Lidya Alfonsi, Ángel del Pozo, Aldo Sanbrell, Nello Pazzafini, José Torres, Linda Veras, Antonio Casas, Frank Braña, Guy Heron, Lorenzo Robledo, Francisco Sanz	Italy	spaghetti Western
The Fastest Guitar Alive	Michael D. Moore	Roy Orbison, Sammy Jackson, Joan Freeman, Lyle Bettger, John Doucette, Patricia Donahue, Ben Cooper, Ben Lessy, Douglas Kennedy, Iron Eyes Cody	United States	musical Western
Fort Utah	Lesley Selander	John Ireland, Virginia Mayo, Scott Brady, John Russell, Robert Strauss, Richard Arlen, James Craig, Jim Davis, Don "Red" Barry	United States	B Western
Fury of Johnny Kid	Gianni Puccini	Peter Lee Lawrence, Cristina Galbó	Italy; Spain	spaghetti Western version of William Shakespeare's tragedy Romeo and Juliet
Gunfight in Abilene	William Hale	Bobby Darin, Emily Banks, Leslie Nielsen, Donnelly Rhodes, Don Galloway, Frank McGrath, Michael Sarrazin, Barbara Werle, Don Dubbins	United States	B Western
The Hellbenders	Sergio Corbucci	Joseph Cotten, Norma Bengell, Julián Mateos, Gino Pernice, Ángel Aranda, Claudio Gora, María Martín, Enio Girolami, Julio Peña, José Nieto, Claudio Scarchilli, José Canalejas, Aldo Sambrell, Al Mulock, Mimmo Poli, Benito Stefanelli	Italy	spaghetti Western
Hombre	Martin Ritt	Paul Newman, Fredric March, Richard Boone, Diane Cilento, Cameron Mitchell, Barbara Rush, Margaret Blye, Martin Balsam, Frank Silvera, David Canary, Val Avery, Larry Ward	United States	revisionist Western
Hostile Guns	R.G. Springsteen	George Montgomery, Yvonne De Carlo, Tab Hunter, Brian Donlevy, John Russell, Leo Gordon, Pedro Gonzalez Gonzalez, James Craig, Richard Arlen, Don "Red" Barry	United States	B Western
Hour of the Gun	John Sturges	James Garner, Jason Robards, Robert Ryan, Albert Salmi, Charles Aidman, Steve Ihnat, Michael Tolan, William Windom, Lonny Chapman, Larry Gates, William Schallert, Bill Fletcher, Karl Swenson, Monte Markham, Sam Melville, Jon Voight, Robert Phillips, Frank Converse	United States	traditional Western
The Jackals	Robert D. Webb	Vincent Price, Robert Gunnar, Diana Ivarson	South Africa	South African Western remake of Yellow Sky
Johnny Yuma	Romolo Guerrieri	Mark Damon, Rosalba Neri, Lawrence Dobkin	Italy	spaghetti Western
Kill the Wicked!	Tanio Boccia	Larry Ward, Rod Dana	Italy	spaghetti Western
The Last Challenge	Richard Thorpe	Glenn Ford, Angie Dickinson, Chad Everett, Gary Merrill, Jack Elam, Delphi Lawrence, Royal Dano, Frank McGrath	United States	traditional Western
My Name Is Pecos	Maurizio Lucidi	Robert Woods, Pier Paolo Capponi	Italy	spaghetti Western
Payment in Blood	Enzo G. Castellari	Edd Byrnes, Guy Madison	Italy	spaghetti Western
Pecos Cleans Up	Maurizio Lucidi	Robert Woods, Erno Crisa	Italy	spaghetti Western
El Pistolero Desconocido (El Comandante Tijerina)	Miguel M. Delgado	Eulalio González, Elsa Aguirre, Raúl Meraz	Mexico	comedy Western
Red Blood, Yellow Gold/Professionals for a Massacre	Nando Cicero	George Hilton, Edd Byrnes, George Martin	Spain; Italy	spaghetti Civil War Western
Red Tomahawk	R.G. Springsteen	Howard Keel, Joan Caulfield, Broderick Crawford, Scott Brady, Wendell Corey, Richard Arlen, Don "Red" Barry, Roy Jenson	United States	B Western
Return of the Gunfighter	James Neilson	Robert Taylor, Chad Everett, Ana Martín, Mort Mills, Michael Pate, John Crawford, Lyle Bettger, John Davis Chandler, Rodolfo Hoyos Jr.	United States	B Western
The Ride to Hangman's Tree	Alan Rafkin	Jack Lord, Melodie Johnson, James Farentino, Don Galloway, Richard Anderson, Ed Peck, Robert Cornthwaite, John Pickard, Claudia Bryar, Robert Sorrells	United States	B Western
Ringo Kid			Turkey	Yeşilçam Western
Rita of the West	Ferdinando Baldi	Rita Pavone, Terence Hill	Italy	spaghetti Western musical
Rough Night in Jericho	Arnold Laven	Dean Martin, George Peppard, Jean Simmons, John McIntire, Slim Pickens, Don Galloway, Brad Weston, Richard O'Brien, Carol Andreson	United States	traditional Western
A Stranger in Town	Luigi Vanzi	Tony Anthony, Jolanda Modio	Italy	spaghetti Western
Stranger on the Run	Don Siegel	Henry Fonda, Anne Baxter, Michael Parks, Dan Duryea, Sal Mineo	United States	Made for television movie
The Stranger Returns	Luigi Vanzi	Tony Anthony, Daniele Vargas	Italy	spaghetti Western
A Time for Killing	Phil Karlson	Glenn Ford, Inger Stevens, Paul Petersen, Kenneth Tobey, Harrison Ford, George Hamilton, Max Baer Jr., Todd Armstrong, Harry Dean Stanton	United States	B Western
The War Wagon	Burt Kennedy	John Wayne, Kirk Douglas, Howard Keel, Robert Walker Jr., Keenan Wynn, Bruce Cabot, Joanna Barnes, Valora Noland, Bruce Dern, Gene Evans, Terry Wilson, Don Collier, Sheb Wooley, Ann McCrea, Emilio Fernández, Frank McGrath, Chuck Roberson, Boyd "Red" Morgan, Hal Needham, Jerry Gatlin	United States	traditional Western
Waterhole #3	William A. Graham	James Coburn, Carroll O'Connor, Margaret Blye, Claude Akins, James Whitmore, Bruce Dern, Joan Blondell	United States	comedy Western
The Way West	Andrew McLaglen	Kirk Douglas, Robert Mitchum, Richard Widmark, Lola Albright, Jack Elam, Sally Field, Stubby Kaye, Katherine Justice, Connie Sawyer, Harry Carey Jr., Patric Knowles	United States	epic Western
Welcome to Hard Times	Burt Kennedy	Henry Fonda, Janice Rule, Keenan Wynn, Janis Paige, John Anderson, Warren Oates, Fay Spain, Edgar Buchanan, Aldo Ray, Denver Pyle, Arlene Golonka, Lon Chaney Jr., Royal Dano, Paul Fix, Elisha Cook Jr., Ann McCrea	United States	traditional Western
Winchester '73	Herschel Daugherty	Tom Tryon, John Saxon, Dan Duryea, John Drew Barrymore, Joan Blondell, John Dehner	United States	Made for television movie
Zlatna praćka	Radivoje Lola Đukić	Miodrag Petrović Čkalja, Vera Ilić-Đukić, Đokica Milanković	Yugoslavia	comedy Western
1968
5 Card Stud	Henry Hathaway	Dean Martin, Robert Mitchum, Inger Stevens, Roddy McDowall, Katherine Justice, John Anderson, Ruth Springford, Yaphet Kotto, Denver Pyle, Bill Fletcher, Whit Bissell, Ted de Corsia, Don Collier, Roy Jenson, Jerry Gatlin	United States	mystery Western
Ace High	Giuseppe Colizzi	Eli Wallach, Terence Hill, Bud Spencer, Brock Peters, Kevin McCarthy	Italy	spaghetti Western
Ang Pababalik ni Daniel Barrion	Armando Garces	Fernando Poe Jr., Paquito Diaz, Rudy Fernandez	Philippines	Phil Western
Arizona Bushwhackers	Lesley Selander	Howard Keel, Yvonne De Carlo, John Ireland, Marilyn Maxwell, Scott Brady, Brian Donlevy, Barton MacLane, James Craig	United States	B Western
Bandolero!	Andrew V. McLaglen	James Stewart, Dean Martin, Raquel Welch, George Kennedy, Andrew Prine, Will Geer, Clint Ritchie, Denver Pyle, Rudy Diaz, Harry Carey Jr., Don "Red" Barry, Perry Lopez, Wilford Brimley, John Mitchum, Jerry Gatlin, "Big" John Hamilton	United States	traditional Western
Between God, the Devil and a Winchester	Marino Girolami	Richard Harrison, Gilbert Roland	Italy	spaghetti Western
Beyond the Law	Giorgio Stegani	Lee Van Cleef, Antonio Sabàto	Italy	spaghetti Western
Blue	Silvio Narizzano	Terence Stamp, Joanna Pettet, Karl Malden, Ricardo Montalbán, Anthony Costello, Joe De Santis, James Westerfield, Stathis Giallelis, Carlos East, Sara Vardi, Robert Lipton, Kevin Corcoran, Helen Kleeb, Sally Kirkland, Peggy Lipton, Jerry Gatlin	United Kingdom	Euro-Western
Buckskin	Michael D. Moore	Barry Sullivan, Joan Caulfield, Wendell Corey, Lon Chaney Jr., John Russell, Barbara Hale, Barton MacLane, Bill Williams, Leo Gordon, Richard Arlen, Jean-Michel Michenaud, Michael Larrain	United States	B Western
Ciccio Forgives, I Don't	Marcello Ciorciolini	Franco and Ciccio, Fernando Sancho	Italy	spaghetti Western comedy
Cuadro de Jack (a.k.a. Four of Jacks)	Augusto Buenaventura	Joseph Estrada, Jess Lapid, Jun Aristorenas, Jing Abalos, Imelda Ilanan, George Estregan	Philippines	FilAm western, set in the Phil.
Day of the Evil Gun	Jerry Thorpe	Glenn Ford, Arthur Kennedy, Dean Jagger, John Anderson, Paul Fix, Nico Minardos, Harry Dean Stanton, Pilar Pellicer, Royal Dano, Barbara Babcock, James Griffith	United States	
The Drifting Avenger/Koya no toseinin	Jun'ya Satô	Ken Takakura, Ken Goodlet	Japan	Japanese Western shot in Australia
Find a Place to Die	Giuliano Carnimeo	Jeffrey Hunter, Pascale Petit	Italy	spaghetti Western
Firecreek	Vincent McEveety	James Stewart, Henry Fonda, Inger Stevens, Jacqueline Scott, Gary Lockwood, Dean Jagger, Ed Begley, Jay C. Flippen, Jack Elam, James Best, BarBara Luna, Brooke Bundy, Morgan Woodward, John Qualen	United States	traditional Western
Gatling Gun	Paolo Bianchinii	Robert Woods, John Ireland	Italy	spaghetti Western
Go Kill Everybody and Come Back Alone	Enzo G. Castellari	Chuck Connors, Frank Wolff	Italy	spaghetti Western
God Made Them... I Kill Them	Paolo Bianchini	Dean Reed, Peter Martell	Italy	spaghetti Western
The Great Silence	Sergio Corbucci	Jean-Louis Trintignant, Klaus Kinski	Italy	anti-Western/revisionist Western
Guns for San Sebastian	Henri Verneuil	Anthony Quinn, Charles Bronson, Anjanette Comer, Silvia Pinal, Sam Jaffe, Jaime Fernández, Jorge Martínez de Hoyos	France; Italy; Mexico	Euro/spaghetti Western
Hang 'Em High	Ted Post	Clint Eastwood, Inger Stevens, Ed Begley, Pat Hingle, Ben Johnson, Charles McGraw, Ruth White, Bruce Dern, Alan Hale, Jr., Arlene Golonka, James Westerfield, Dennis Hopper, L. Q. Jones, Michael O'Sullivan, Joseph Sirola, James MacArthur, Bob Steele, Bert Freed, Russell Thorsen, Ned Romero, Jonathan Lippe, Tod Andrews, Mark Lenard, Jack Ging	United States	revenge Western
Hate Thy Neighbor	Ferdinando Baldi	Clyde Garner, George Eastman, Nicoletta Machiavelli, Ivy Holzer, Horst Frank, Robert Rice, Paolo Magalotti, Franco Fantasia, Claudio Castellani, Ivan Scratuglia	Italy	spaghetti Western
I Do Not Forgive... I Kill! (a.k.a. Fedra West)	Joaquín Luis Romero Marchent	James Philbrook, Norma Bengell, Simón Andreu	Spain; Italy	spaghetti Western
If You Meet Sartana Pray for Your Death	Gianfranco Parolini	Gianni Garko, William Berger	Italy	spaghetti Western
The Last of the Mohicans	Jean Dréville	Hellmut Lange, Pierre Massimi	France; West Germany; Romania	Euro-Western version of The Last of the Mohicans
Lonesome Cowboys	Andy Warhol	Joe Dallesandro	United States	satirical Western
The Longest Hunt	Bruno Corbucci	Brian Kelly, Keenan Wynn, Erika Blanc, Folco Lulli, Fabrizio Moroni, Linda Sini, Krista Nell, Rik Battaglia, Luigi Bonos, Enzo Andronico, Ignazio Leone, Luca Sportelli	Italy	spaghetti Western
The Mercenary	Sergio Corbucci	Franco Nero, Tony Musante, Jack Palance, Giovanna Ralli, Eduardo Fajardo, Franco Giacobini, Álvaro de Luna, Raf Baldassarre, Franco Ressel, José Canalejas, Remo De Angelis, Tito García, Julio Peña, Milo Quesada, José Riesgo, Lorenzo Robledo, Ángel Álvarez	Italy	spaghetti Western
A Minute to Pray, a Second to Die	Franco Giraldi	Alex Cord, Arthur Kennedy, Robert Ryan, Nicoletta Rangoni Machiavelli, Mario Brega, José Canalejas, Daniel Martín, Antonio Molino Rojo, Lorenzo Robledo, Aldo Sambrell	Italy	spaghetti Western
More Dead Than Alive	Robert Sparr	Clint Walker, Vincent Price, Anne Francis, Paul Hampton, Mike Henry, William Woodson	United States	B Western
The Nephews of Zorro	Franco Giraldi	Franco and Ciccio, Dean Reed	Italy	spaghetti Western Zorro comedy
Once Upon a Time in the West	Sergio Leone	Claudia Cardinale, Henry Fonda, Charles Bronson, Jason Robards, Gabriele Ferzetti, Keenan Wynn, Frank Wolff, Woody Strode, Jack Elam, Al Mulock, Benito Stefanelli, Aldo Sambrell	Italy	epic/spaghetti Western
One Against One... No Mercy	Rafael Romero Marchent	Peter Lee Lawrence	Spain	spaghetti Western
The One and Only, Genuine, Original Family Band	Michael O'Herlihy	Walter Brennan, Buddy Ebsen, Lesley Ann Warren, John Davidson,	United States	musical Western
¿Quién grita venganza?/Dead Men Don't Count	Rafael Romero Marchent	Anthony Steffen, Mark Damon	Spain	
Requiem para el gringo	Eugenio Martín, José Luis Merino	Lang Jeffries, Fernando Sancho	Italy, Spain	spaghetti Western
Run, Man, Run!	Sergio Sollima	Tomas Milian, Donal O'Brien, Linda Veras, John Ireland, Chelo Alonso, Marco Guglielmi, Edward Ross, Nello Pazzafini, Gianni Rizzo, Dan May, Noé Murayama, Attilio Dottesio, Orso Maria Guerrini, Federico Boido, Calisto Calisti	Italy	spaghetti Western
The Ruthless Four	Giorgio Capitani	Van Heflin, Gilbert Roland, Klaus Kinski, George Hilton	Italy; West Germany	Euro-Western
The Scalphunters	Sydney Pollack	Burt Lancaster, Shelley Winters, Ossie Davis, Telly Savalas, Dabney Coleman, Paul Picerni, Dan Vadis, Nick Cravat, Armando Silvestre	United States	comedy Western
The Shakiest Gun in the West	Alan Rafkin	Don Knotts, Barbara Rhoades, Jackie Coogan, Don "Red" Barry, Frank McGrath, Terry Wilson	United States	comedy Western
Shalako	Edward Dmytryk	Sean Connery, Brigitte Bardot, Stephen Boyd, Jack Hawkins, Peter van Eyck, Honor Blackman, Woody Strode, Eric Sykes, Alexander Knox, Valerie French, Don "Red" Barry	United States; Spain	traditional Western shot in Spain
Something for a Lonely Man	Don Taylor	Dan Blocker, Susan Clark, John Dehner, Warren Oates, Paul Petersen, Don Stroud	United States	Made for television movie
Spur des Falken	Gottfried Kolditz	Gojko Mitić, Hannjo Hasse, Barbara Brylska	East Germany	red Western
The Stalking Moon	Robert Mulligan	Gregory Peck, Eva Marie Saint, Robert Forster, Frank Silvera, Lonny Chapman, Charles Tyner, Joaquín Martinez, Boyd Morgan	United States	traditional/mystery/suspense Western
Stay Away, Joe	Peter Tewksbury	Elvis Presley, Burgess Meredith, Joan Blondell, Katy Jurado, Henry Jones, L. Q. Jones, Quentin Dean	United States	contemporary/musical Western
Tepepa	Giulio Petroni	Tomas Milian, Orson Welles	Italy	spaghetti Western
Three Guns for Texas	Earl Bellamy, David Lowell Rich, Paul Stanley	Neville Brand, Peter Brown, William Smith, Martin Milner, Philip Carey, Albert Salmi, Cliff Osmond, Michael Conrad, John Abbott, Richard Devon, Ralph Manza, Dub Taylor, Shelley Morrison, Roy Barcroft, X Brands, Richard Collier, Chuck Courtney, John Mitchum	United States	traditional Western
Today It's Me... Tomorrow It's You!	Tonino Cervi	Montgomery Ford, Bud Spencer, Wayde Preston, William Berger, Tatsuya Nakadai, Jeff Cameron, Stanley Gordon, Diana Madigan, Doro Corra', Aldo Marianecci, Michele Borelli, Umberto Di Grazia, Franco Pechini	Italy	spaghetti Western
Trusting Is Good... Shooting Is Better	Osvaldo Civirani	George Hilton, John Ireland, Sandra Milo	Italy	spaghetti Western
Two Brothers, One Death (a.k.a. Dos hombres van a morir)	Rafael Romero Marchent	Pietro Martellanza, Piero Lulli, Armando Calvo	Spain; Italy	spaghetti Western
The Valley of Death	Harald Reinl	Lex Barker, Pierre Brice	West Germany; Italy; Yugoslavia	Euro-Western
Villa Rides	Buzz Kulik	Yul Brynner, Robert Mitchum, Charles Bronson, Maria Grazia Buccella, Herbert Lom, Frank Wolff, Alexander Knox, Diana Lorys, Robert Carricart, Fernando Rey, John Ireland, Jill Ireland	United States	historical Western set in Mexico, shot in Spain
The Wicked Die Slow	William K. Hennigar	Gary Allen, Steve Rivard, Jeff Kanew	United States	B Western
Will Penny	Tom Gries	Charlton Heston, Joan Hackett, Donald Pleasence, Ben Johnson, Lee Majors, Bruce Dern, Slim Pickens, Anthony Zerbe, Matt Clark, Jon Gries, Clifton James, Anthony Zerbe, Roy Jenson, G. D. Spradlin, Quentin Dean, William Schallert, Luke Askew, Anthony Costello, Gene Rutherford	United States	traditional Western
1969
100 Rifles	Tom Gries	Jim Brown, Raquel Welch, Burt Reynolds, Fernando Lamas, Dan O'Herlihy, Hans Gudegast, Michael Forest, Aldo Sambrell, Soledad Miranda, Alberto Dalbés, Carlos Bravo, José Manuel Martín, Akim Tamiroff, Sancho Gracia, Lorenzo Lamas	United States	revisionist Western
6 Jahanam	P. Ramlee	Yusof Latiff, P. Ramlee, Noor Azizah	Malaysia	spaghetti Western
Backtrack!	Earl Bellamy	Neville Brand, James Drury, Doug McClure, Peter Brown, William Smith, Philip Carey, Ida Lupino, Rhonda Fleming, Fernando Lamas, Royal Dano, Gary Clarke, Randy Boone, L.Q. Jones, Carol Bryon, Ross Elliot, Hal Baylor, George Savalas, Alberto Morin	United States	Sequences from The Virginian (1965) and the television pilot for Laredo.
Boot Hill	Giuseppe Colizzi	Terence Hill, Bud Spencer, Woody Strode, George Eastman, Eduardo Ciannelli, Glauco Onorato, Alberto Dell'Acqua, Nazzareno Zamperla, Victor Buono, Lionel Stander, Wayde Preston	Italy	spaghetti Western
A Bullet for Sandoval (a.k.a. Los Desesperados)	Julio Buchs, Lucio Fulci	George Hilton, Ernest Borgnine, Alberto de Mendoza, Leo Anchóriz, Annabella Incontrera, Antonio Pica, Manuel Miranda, Gustavo Rojo, Andrea Aureli, Manuel De Blas, Ed Byrnes	Italy	spaghetti Western
Butch Cassidy and the Sundance Kid	George Roy Hill	Paul Newman, Robert Redford, Katharine Ross, Strother Martin, Henry Jones, Jeff Corey, George Furth, Cloris Leachman, Ted Cassidy, Kenneth Mars, Donnelly Rhodes, Timothy Scott, Charles Dierkop, Paul Bryar, Sam Elliott, Jody Gilbert	United States	outlaw/revisionist Western
Charro!	Charles Marquis Warren	Elvis Presley, Ina Balin, Victor French, Barbara Werle, Paul Brinegar, Tony Young	United States	traditional Western
Death of a Gunfighter	Alan Smithee	Richard Widmark, Lena Horne, Carroll O'Connor, Jacqueline Scott, John Saxon, Dub Taylor, Darleen Carr, David Opatoshu, Kent Smith, Morgan Woodward	United States	traditional Western
The Desperados	Henry Levin	Vince Edwards, Jack Palance, George Maharis, Sylvia Syms, Kate O'Mara, Christian Roberts, Neville Brand, Sheila Burrell, Christopher Malcolm, Kenneth Cope, Patrick Holt	United States	traditional Western shot in Spain
The Desperate Mission	Earl Bellamy	Ricardo Montalbán, Slim Pickens, Roosevelt Grier	United States	Made for TV Movie
The Five Man Army	Don Taylor	Peter Graves, James Daly, Bud Spencer	Italy	spaghetti Western
The Forgotten Pistolero	Ferdinando Baldi	Leonard Mann, Luciana Paluzzi	Spain; Italy	spaghetti Western version of Orestes
Garringo	Rafael Romero Marchent	Anthony Steffen, Peter Lee Lawrence	Spain	spaghetti Western
The Good Guys and the Bad Guys	Burt Kennedy	Robert Mitchum, George Kennedy, Martin Balsam, John Carradine, Tina Louise, David Carradine, Lois Nettleton, John Carradine, Buddy Hackett, Douglas Fowley, John Davis Chandler, Dick Peabody, Kathleen Freeman, Jimmy Murphy, Garrett Lewis, Nick Dennis, Dorothy Adams	United States	comedy Western
Guns of the Magnificent Seven	Paul Wendkos	George Kennedy, James Whitmore, Monte Markham, Joe Don Baker, Bernie Casey, Reni Santoni, Scott Thomas, Michael Ansara, Frank Silvera, Wende Wagner, Fernando Rey	United States	traditional Western shot in Spain
Hate Is My God	Claudio Gora	Tony Kendall	Italy; West Germany	spaghetti Western
Heaven with a Gun	Lee H. Katzin	Glenn Ford, Carolyn Jones, Barbara Hershey, John Anderson, David Carradine, J.D. Cannon, Noah Beery Jr., William Bryant, Ed Bakey, Barbara Babcock	United States	traditional Western
Mackenna's Gold	J. Lee Thompson	Gregory Peck, Omar Sharif, Telly Savalas, Camilla Sparv, Julie Newmar, Ted Cassidy, Keenan Wynn, Lee J. Cobb, Raymond Massey, Burgess Meredith, Anthony Quayle, Edward G. Robinson, Eli Wallach, Victor Jory	United States	traditional Western
Manos torpes/Awkward Hands	Rafael Romero Marchent	Peter Lee Lawrence	Spain	spaghetti Western
No Room to Die	Sergio Garrone	Anthony Steffen, William Berger	Italy	spaghetti Western
The Over-the-Hill Gang	George McCowan	Walter Brennan, Pat O'Brien, Chill Wills, Edgar Buchanan, Gypsy Rose Lee, Andy Devine, Jack Elam, William Smith, Edward Andrews, Ricky Nelson, Kristin Nelson, Myron Healey, Rex Holman, Bruce Glover, Allen Pinson, Burt Mustin, Almira Sessions, Robert Karnes, Dennis Cross, William 'Billy' Benedict	United States	comedy Western television film
Paint Your Wagon	Joshua Logan	Lee Marvin, Clint Eastwood, Jean Seberg, Harve Presnell, Ray Walston, Tom Ligon, Alan Dexter, William O'Connell, Alan Baxter, Paula Trueman, Robert Easton, Geoffrey Norman, H.B. Haggerty, Terry Jenkins, John Mitchum, Sue Casey, Eddie Little Sky, Harvey Parry, William Mims, Roy Jenson	United States	musical Western
The Price of Power	Tonino Valerii	Giuliano Gemma, Warren Vanders, Maria Cuadra	Italy	spaghetti Western
Sabata	Frank Kramer	Lee Van Cleef, William Berger, Pedro Sanchez, Nick Jordan, Linda Veras, Franco Ressel, Anthony Gradwell, Robert Hundar, Gianni Rizzo	Italy	spaghetti Western
Sam Whiskey	Arnold Laven	Burt Reynolds, Angie Dickinson, Clint Walker, Ossie Davis, William Schallert, Woodrow Parfrey, Chubby Johnson, Anthony James, Del Reeves	United States	comedy Western
The Silent Gun	Michael Caffey	Lloyd Bridges, John Beck, Ed Begley, Edd Byrnes, Pernell Roberts, Susan Howard	United States	Made for television movie
Smith!	Michael O'Herlihy	Glenn Ford, Nancy Olson, Dean Jagger, Warren Oates, Chief Dan George, John Randolph, Keenan Wynn, Roger Ewing, Jay Silverheels, James Westerfield, William Bryant	United States	contemporary Western
Sonora	Alfonso Balcázar	George Martin	Spain	spaghetti Western
The Specialist	Sergio Corbucci	Johnny Hallyday, Françoise Fabian, Mario Adorf	Italy; France; West Germany	spaghetti Western
Sundance and the Kid	Duccio Tessari	Giuliano Gemma	Italy	spaghetti Western comedy
Support Your Local Sheriff!	Burt Kennedy	James Garner, Joan Hackett, Walter Brennan, Harry Morgan, Jack Elam, Henry Jones, Bruce Dern, Willis Bouchey, Kathleen Freeman, Chubby Johnson, Gene Evans, Jerry Gatlin	United States	comedy Western
Tell Them Willie Boy Is Here	Abraham Polonsky	Robert Redford, Katharine Ross, Robert Blake, Susan Clark, Barry Sullivan, John Vernon, Charles Aidman, Charles McGraw, Shelly Novack, Robert Lipton, Ned Romero	United States	revisionist Western
A Time for Dying	Budd Boetticher	Audie Murphy, Victor Jory, Richard Lapp	United States	B Western
This Savage Land	Vincent McEveety	Barry Sullivan, Glenn Corbett, Kathryn Hays	United States	Made for television movie
True Grit	Henry Hathaway	John Wayne, Glen Campbell, Kim Darby, Jeremy Slate, Robert Duvall, Dennis Hopper, Strother Martin, Jeff Corey, James Westerfield, John Doucette, Hank Worden	United States	traditional Western
El Tunco Maclovio	Alberto Mariscal	Julio Alemán, Juan Miranda	Mexico	
The Undefeated	Andrew McLaglen	John Wayne, Rock Hudson, Tony Aguilar, Roman Gabriel, Marian McCargo, Lee Meriwether, Merlin Olsen, Melissa Newman, Bruce Cabot, Michael Vincent, Ben Johnson, Edward Faulkner, Harry Carey Jr., Paul Fix, Royal Dano, Richard Mulligan, Carlos Rivas, John Agar, Guy Raymond, Don Collier, Big John Hamilton, Dub Taylor, Henry Beckman, Víctor Junco, Robert Donner, Pedro Armendariz Jr., James Dobson, Rudy Diaz, Richard Angarola, Gregg Palmer, Juan García	United States	traditional Western
The Valley of Gwangi	Jim O'Connolly	Gila Golan, James Franciscus	United States	fantasy Western
Weisse Wölfe	Konrad Petzold	Gojko Mitić, Horst Schulze	East Germany; Yugoslavia	red Western
The Wild Bunch	Sam Peckinpah	William Holden, Ernest Borgnine, Robert Ryan, Edmond O'Brien, Warren Oates, Jaime Sánchez, Ben Johnson, Emilio Fernández, Strother Martin, L.Q. Jones, Albert Dekker, Bo Hopkins, Jorge Russek, Alfonso Aráu, Dub Taylor, Elsa Cárdenas	United States	revisionist Western set in Mexico
Young Billy Young	Burt Kennedy	Robert Mitchum, Angie Dickinson, Robert Walker Jr., David Carradine, Jack Kelly, John Anderson, Paul Fix, Willis Bouchey, Rodolfo Acosta	United States	traditional Western
El Zorro justiciero	Rafael Romero Marchent	Fabio Testi. Carlos Romero Marchent	Spain	Zorro Western

== See also ==
- List of Western television series
