= Emilio Rodríguez (actor) =

Spanish actor

- Born: Emilio Rodríguez Guiar; 1918; Madrid
- Died: 1983 (aged 64–65); Madrid
- Occupation: Actor

Emilio Rodríguez (Madrid 1918 – id. 1983) was a Spanish actor. During the Spanish post-war, he worked as a police man and he was a volunteer at División Azul. Between 1950 and 1960 he was a supporting actor. He played Inspector Ballestero in Deadfall (1968), starring Michael Caine, and Warden in Kid Rodelo (1966) At the age of 50 he retired for health problems, and then he starred in Crónicas de un pueblo, in the role of the teacher D. Antonio. After the death of Francisco Franco he was categorized as a francoist character. He finally appeared in Verano azul, and died in 1983.

== Filmography ==
- Nosotros dos (1955) as Customer (uncredited)
- El coyote (1956) (uncredited)
- La vida es maravillosa (1956) as Sr. Gómez
- La justicia del Coyote (1956) as Provocador
- Miedo (1956)
- Todos somos necesarios (1956) as Un pasajero (uncredited)
- Roberto el diablo (1957)
- El hombre que viajaba despacito (1957) as Pasajero del tren
- Fulano y Mengano (1957) as Policía
- Gayarre (1959) as Pedro
- Los tramposos (1959) as Inspector de policía
- De espaldas a la puerta (1959) as Moreno (uncredited)
- Compadece al delincuente (1960)
- Trío de damas (1960) as Joyero No. 2
- Sólo para hombres (1960)
- 091: Policía al habla (1960) as Camionero (uncredited)
- La paz empieza nunca (1960)
- Los económicamente débiles (1960)
- Alerta no Céu (1961) as Oficial torre de control
- Mi noche de bodas (1961) as Policía
- La IV carabela (1961) as Chófer del autocar
- El hombre del expreso de Oriente (1962) as Antonio
- Martes y trece (1962) as Ayudante del inspector
- La venganza del Zorro (1962) as John
- La cara del terror (1962) as Inspector Hopkins
- Terrible Sheriff (1962) as Missouri Henchman No. 2
- Dulcinea (1962)
- Tres hombres buenos (1963) as Hombre de Bardon
- El sabor de la venganza (1963) as Comisario Merrill
- Objetivo: las estrellas (1963)
- Los héroes del Oeste (1964) as Ciudadano
- Los pistoleros de Casa Grande (1964) as Francisco
- Bienvenido, padre Murray (1964)
- Antes llega la muerte (1964) as Capitan
- El séptimo de caballería (1964) as Wagonmaster
- El salario del crimen (1964) as Policía del aeropuerto
- Rueda de sospechosos (1964) as Inspector Roca
- Loca juventud (1965) as Police Commissioner
- Dos caraduras en Texas (1965) as Señor Brenton (uncredited)
- Crimen de doble filo (1965) as Julio Cuétar
- Ocaso de un pistolero (1965) as Ciudadano
- Dos cosmonautas a la fuerza (1965) as Skordiakov
- I due parà (1965) as Diego
- Kid Rodelo (1966) as Warden
- Posición avanzada (1966) as Alcalde
- La muerte cumple condena (1966) as Poker Player (uncredited)
- Texas Kid (1966) as Mitch
- Héroes a la fuerza (1966) as Il presidente
- El aventurero de Guaynas (1966) as Ortega
- Grandes amigos (1967) as El Camionero
- El hombre que mató a Billy el Niño (1967) as Store Customer (uncredited)
- Dos cruces en Danger Pass (1967) as Johnny Miller
- Atraco al hampa (1967) as Bank Director (uncredited)
- La hora del coraje (1968) as Company's Surveyor
- Los subdesarrollados (1968) as Pepe – El policía
- Comanche blanco (1968) as Pasajero (uncredited)
- Los que tocan el piano (1968) as Eusebio
- Uno a uno, sin piedad (1968) as Party Guest (uncredited)
- Angustia mortal (1968) as Police Captain
- No somos ni Romeo ni Julieta (1969) as Don Prudencio
- Siete minutos para morir (1969) as Agente de la CIA en Hong Kong
- El Zorro justiciero (1969) as Ian Vanderman (uncredited)
- Reza por tu alma... y muere (1970) as Villager
- No desearás al vecino del quinto (1970) as Policía en el tren
- Una señora llamada Andrés (1970) as Hombre en carniceria
- El Cristo del Océano (1971) as Un pescador
- El apartamento de la tentación (1971) as Hombre que se cruza con Julieta
- El hombre que vino del odio (1971) as Director de teatro
- Caza implacable (1971) as Priest (uncredited)
- Crónicas de un pueblo (1971–1973, TV Series) as D. Antonio, el maestro
- Un dólar de recompensa (1972) as Henry Davies, Storekeeper
- Condenados a vivir (1972) as Caldwell
- Diabólica malicia (1972)
- Con la música a otra parte (1974) as Inspector
- El comisario G. (El caso del cabaret) (1975)
- La perla negra (1977) as Padre Gallardo
- Curro Jiménez (1977–1978, TV Series) as Padre de Carmen
- Estimado Sr. juez... (1978) as El tendero
- Réquiem por un empleado (1978)
- Novela (1978, TV Series)
- El felino (1979) as Italian party guest
- La boda del señor cura (1979) as Padre de Marta
- Y al tercer año, resucitó (1980) as Alcalde
- Chocolate (1980) as Comisario
- Hijos de papá (1980) as Sr. Aymerich
- Maravillas (1981) as El confesor
- Pájaros de ciudad (1981)
- Pepe, no me des tormento (1981) as Comisario
- Verano azul (1982, TV Series) as Médico
- El cabezota (1982) as Juez (final film role)
