= Dollars for a Fast Gun =

1965 film by Joaquín Luis Romero Marchent

- Italian: 100.000 dollari per Lassiter
- Spanish: La muerte cumple condena
- Directed by: Joaquín Luis Romero Marchent
- Screenplay by: Sergio Donati
- Story by: Joaquín Luis Romero Marchent; Sergio Donati
- Produced by: Félix Durán Aparicio; Alberto Grimaldi; Joaquín Luis Romero Marchent
- Starring: Robert Hundar; Pamela Tudor; José Bódalo; Jesús Puente; Miguel Angel Hidalgo; Maria Cinta; Roberto Camardiel
- Cinematography: Rafael Pacheco; Fulvio Testi
- Edited by: Eugenio Alabiso; Mercedes Alonso; Renato Cinquini
- Music by: Marcello Giombini
- Production companies: Centauro Films; Produzioni Europee Associate
- Distributed by: Produzioni Europee Associate; Andrés Salvador Molina; Team-Film; World Enterprises Corp.; Ízaro Films; Avanz Entertainment
- Release date: 10 March 1966
- Running time: 99 min
- Countries: Spain; Italy

Dollars for a Fast Gun (also known as 100.000 dollari per Lassiter and La muerte cumple condena) is a 1966 Italian-Spanish comedy western film directed by Joaquín Luis Romero Marchent with Mariano Canales as the assistant director, it was written by Sergio Donati, and scored by Marcello Giombini. It stars Robert Hundar, Pamela Tudor, Roberto Camardiel and José Bódalo.

This film supposed the breakup between Marchent and Grimaldi. The film was collaborated by Sergio Leone's mates. It did not receive good reviews.

Marchent western films such as Seven Hours of Gunfire (1965), Dollars for a Fast Gun and I Do Not Forgive... I Kill! (1968) are some of Quentin Tarantino's references.

== Cast ==
- Robert Hundar as Lassiter
- Pamela Tudor as Sarah
- Luigi Pistilli as Danny
- José Bódalo as Martin
- Jesús Puente as Frank Nolan
- Roberto Camardiel as Pedro
- Aldo Sambrell as Rick, Martin Henchman
- Benito Stefanelli as Donovan, Foreman
- Robert Johnson Jr.
- Livia Contardi
- Luis Caster as Tod
- Antoñito Ruiz
- Ricardo Ortiz as Henchman
- Carlos Romero Marchent as Miguel, Pedro's Assistant
- Andrew Ray as Sheriff
- Agustín Bescos as Pat
- Fernando Bilbao as Martin Henchman
- Maria Cinta as Katie - Sarah's Daughter
- Gaspar 'Indio' González as Damon, Martin Bodyguard
- Miguel Angel Hidalgo as Sarah's Son
- Fernando Hilbeck as Gunman at Mine
- Jorge Llopis as Marc
- Dina Loy as Pat's Daughter
- Guillermo Méndez as Martin Bodyguard
- Ángel Ortiz as Martin Debt Collector
- Giovanni Petti as Barman
- Luis Prendes as Mack
- Emilio Rodríguez as Poker Player
- Francisco Sanz as Doctor
- Rafael Vaquero as Rancher Shot in Saloon
