= Francisco Sanz (actor) =

Spanish actor

- Sanz as Madera in Tepepa (1969)
- Born: Francisco Mateu Sanz; May 21, 1921
- Died: early 2000s
- Occupation: Actor

Francisco Mateu Sanz (21 March 1921 – 2000s), known as Paco Sanz, was a Spanish actor. He has appeared in more than eighty films since 1964. He is known for The Relentless Four (1965), El hombre que mató a Billy el Niño (1967), Cervantes (1981) and Teresa de Jesús (1984). He has worked with Miguel Fernández Milá, Tomás Blanco, Manuel Alexandre, Federico de Urrutia, Fausto Tozzi, Antonio Pica, José Orjas, Gloria Milland, José Mallorquí and Álvaro de Luna.

== Filmography ==
Year	Title	Role	Notes
1941	Heart of Gold	Pelegrín	Uncredited
1963	Three Ruthless Ones	Juez Klem	
1964	El escándalo		
1964	The Seven from Texas	Rogers	
1964	Relevo para un pistolero	Banquero Matthews	
1965	Seven Hours of Gunfire	Pastor Norman	
1965	Five Thousand Dollars on One Ace	Craig	
1965	A Pistol for Ringo	Colonel	
1965	Shoot to Kill	Federal Agent	
1965	Agent 3S3: Passport to Hell	Nobel	
1965	Hands of a Gunfighter	Alex Dixon	
1965	Man from Canyon City	Minero	
1965	Desperate Mission	Prof. Larsen	
1965	100.000 dollari per Ringo	Jose	
1965	The Relentless Four	Doctor	
1966	Dollars for a Fast Gun	Doctor	Uncredited
1966	Savage Gringo	Dottor Parson	
1966	Lightning Bolt	Professor Rooney	
1966	Yankee	Consalvo	
1966	Un gangster venuto da Brooklyn		
1967	Django Kill... If You Live, Shoot!	Reverend Alderman	
1967	I'll Kill Him and Return Alone	Peddler	
1967	Spia spione	Giorgio	
1967	God Forgives... I Don't!	Full-bearded fawning informant with glasses	
1967	Face to Face	Rusty Rogers	Uncredited
1967	A Minute to Pray, a Second to Die	Ed – Barber	Uncredited
1968	One by One	Zebulon	
1968	Colpo sensazionale al servizio del Sifar	Professor Cociste	
1969	Battle of the Last Panzer	Doctor	
1969	Tepepa	President Madero	
1969	Twenty Thousand Dollars for Seven	Padre di Jane	Uncredited
1969	Las trompetas del apocalipsis	Beatnik	Uncredited
1969	The Price of Power	Pat	
1969	¡¡Se armó el belén!!	Objetante	
1970	Socrates		TV Movie, Uncredited
1970	Un par de asesinos	Judge Parker	Uncredited
1970	Light the Fuse... Sartana Is Coming	Judge in Sandy Creek	
1971	El Zorro de Monterrey	Posadero	
1971	Dead Men Ride	Telegraphist	
1971	In nome del padre, del figlio e della Colt	Pick	
1972	Ben and Charlie	Samuel J. Cobb – Gunsmith of Red Rock	Uncredited
1972	Monta in sella!! Figlio di...		
1972	Tombs of the Blind Dead	Professor Candal	
1972	A Reason to Live, a Reason to Die	Farmer	
1973	Return of the Blind Dead	Station Manager	
1973	Fasthand	Joe Smart	
1973	The Fighting Fist of Shanghai Joe	Cristina's Father	Uncredited
1974	Let Sleeping Corpses Lie	Perkins	
1976	La querida		
1976	El chiste		
1978	Avisa a Curro Jiménez		
1979	El virgo de Visanteta		
1979	Visanteta, estáte quieta		
1981	Pepe, no me des tormento	Manuel	Uncredited
1982	Cristóbal Colón, de oficio... descubridor		
1983	La conquista de Albania	Obispo	
1983	El Cid cabreador		
1984	El caso Almería	Defensor Teniente	
1995	Así en el cielo como en la tierra	Moisés	(final film role)
