= Mercedes Alonso =

Spanish film editor

- Born: 1913; Spain
- Died: 18 March 2013 (aged 99–100); Madrid, Spain
- Occupation: Film editor
- Years active: 1949–1991

Mercedes Alonso (1913–2013) was a prolific Spanish film editor active from the 1940s through the 1990s.

== Selected filmography ==
- All Is Possible in Granada (1982)
- The House That Screamed (1970)
- Urtain, el rey de la selva... o así (1969)
- I Do Not Forgive... I Kill! (1968)
- The Tough One (1966)
- Hands of a Gunfighter (1965)
- Seven Hours of Gunfire (1965)
- Hour of Death (1964)
- Cavalca e uccidi (1964)
- Four Bullets for Joe (1964)
- Implacable Three (1963)
- Héroes de blanco (1962)
- La rosa roja (1960)
- Nada menos que un arkángel (1960)
- El Vaquero and the Girl (1956)
- Terroristi a Madrid (1955)
- La patrulla (1954)
- Bella, la salvaje (1953)
