= The Shadow of Zorro (film) =

1962 film by Joaquín Luis Romero Hernández Marchent

- Spanish: Cabalgando hacia la muerte
- Italian: L'ombra di Zorro
- Directed by: Joaquín Luis Romero Marchent
- Written by: Jesús Franco
- Screenplay by: José Mallorquí; Joaquín Romero Hernández
- Story by: José Mallorquí; Joaquín Romero Hernández
- Produced by: Alberto Grimaldi; Attilio Tosato; Norberto Soliño
- Cinematography: Enrico Betti Berutto; Rafael Pacheco
- Edited by: Mercedes Alonso
- Music by: Francesco De Masi; Manuel Parada
- Production companies: Explorer Film '58; Produzioni Europee Associate; Copercines, Cooperativa Cinematográfica; Lesoeur
- Distributed by: Compton-Cameo Films; Svea Film; Allied Artists Television; Exclusivas Floralva Distribución S.A.
- Release date: 22 December 1962 (Italy)
- Running time: 87 min
- Country: Spain

The Shadow of Zorro (Spanish: Cabalgando hacia la muerte; Italian: L'ombra di Zorro) is a 1962 Spanish western film directed by Joaquín Luis Romero Marchent, written by José Mallorquí and Jess Franco, and starring Frank Latimore, Maria Luz Galicia, Mario Feliciani, Raffaella Carrà, Robert Hundar and Gianni Santuccio.

== Plot ==
Two brothers, Billy (Claudio Undari) and Dan (Paul Piaget), head to California, determined to hunt down and kill Zorro to avenge the death of their brother.

Their ploy, Billy will dress up as Zorro and commit a variety of atrocities, hopefully drawing the real Zorro out of retirement.

The real Zorro is Don Jose de la Torre (Frank Latimore), the richest man in California. His fiancé Maria (Maria Luz Galicia) doesn't want to see Zorro resurrected. She wants to marry and live a quiet life.

Don Jose isn't fond of donning the mask again either.

But when Billy and Dan have trouble learning the identity of Zorro, they start capturing and threatening those who might be able to provide the answers.

Finally, it's the brutal death of an aging servant named Raimundo that spurs Zorro back into action.

== Cast ==
- Frank Latimore as Don José de la Torre - Zorro
- María Luz Galicia as María
- Paul Piaget as Dan
- Robert Hundar as Billy
- José Marco Davó as the governor
- Jesús Tordesillas as Raimundo
- Marco Feliciani as McDonald
- María Silva as Irene
- José Marco as Olo
- Diana Lorys as Mestiza
- Ralph Baldasarre as Chinto
- Marco Tulli as Tom Gray
- Juan Antonio Arévalo as Fernando
- Carlos R. Marchent as Chema
- Sira Origo as governor's wife
- Xan das Bolas as the bank clerk
- Raffaella Carrà as Carmela
- Miguel Merino as a Dan's man
- Simón Arriago as a Dan's man
- Montoya as the child
- Gonzalo Esquiroz as a Dan's man
- Alberto Cubi
- Pedro R. Quevedo as the banker
- Rufino Inglés as the coachman
- Francisco Camoira as the deaf and blind man
- Gianni Santuccio as the minister
- Guillermo Méndez as the fencing master
- Lorenzo Robledo the capitan
- Howard Vernon as the general
- Rafael Cortés as the citizen in Black Suit
