= A Hole in the Forehead =

1968 film

- Directed by: Giuseppe Vari
- Written by: Adriano Bolzoni
- Starring: Anthony Ghidra
- Cinematography: Amerigo Gengarelli
- Music by: Roberto Pregadio
- Release date: 1968
- Country: Italy
- Language: Italian

A Hole in the Forehead (Italian: Un buco in fronte, also known as A Hole Between the Eyes) is a 1968 Italian Spaghetti Western film directed by Giuseppe Vari.

== Cast ==
- Dragomir Bojanić as Billy Blood (credited as Anthony Ghidra)
- Robert Hundar as General Munguja
- Rosy Zichel as Adelita
- Corinne Fontaine as Placida
- Giuseppe Addobbati as Prior Blasco
- Jhon Bryan as Miguel
