= Urtain, el rey de la selva... o así =

- Directed by: Manuel Summers
- Screenplay by: Manuel Summers
- Produced by: Rafael Cuevas (director of production), Antonio Cuevas (executive producer)
- Cinematography: Luis Cuadrado
- Edited by: Mercedes Alonso
- Music by: Carmelo Bernaola
- Release date: 1969
- Running time: 98 min
- Country: Spanish
- Languages: Spanish, Basque

Urtain, el rey de la selva... o así (lit. 'Urtain, king of the jungle', 'Urtain, king of the mountains') is a 1969 Spanish documentary film about Basque boxer José Manuel Ibar nicknamed Urtain. The film notably features Spanish singer Marisol.

The film was written and directed by Manuel Summers. It was filmed by cinematographer Luis Cuadrado and edited by Mercedes Alonso. The music for the soundtrack was provided by composer Carmelo Bernaola.

== Plot ==
The film shows the future European heavyweight champion at the top of his game.

== See also ==
- List of boxing films
