= Terrible Sheriff =

1962 film by Alberto De Martino

- Italian: Due contro tutti
- Directed by: Alberto De Martino; Antonio Momplet
- Screenplay by: Mario Guerra; Ruggero Maccari; José Mallorquí; Giulio Scarnicci; Ettore Scola; Vittorio Vighi
- Story by: Mario Guerra; Vittorio Vighi
- Produced by: Emo Bistolfi
- Cinematography: Carlo Di Palma; Dario Di Palma; Ricardo Torres
- Edited by: Otello Colangeli; Gaby Peñalba
- Music by: Manuel Parada; Franco Pisano
- Production companies: Cineproduzione Emo Bistolfi; Copercines, Cooperativa Cinematográfica
- Distributed by: Variety Distribution
- Release date: 4 December 1962
- Running time: 80 min
- Country: Italy

Terrible Sheriff or Two Against All (Italian: Due contro tutti) is a 1962 Italian Spaghetti Western parody comedy film directed by Alberto De Martino and Antonio Momplet, cinematographed by Carlo Di Palma, and starring Raimondo Vianello and Walter Chiari.

== Cast ==
- Walter Chiari as Bull Bullivan
- Raimondo Vianello as Jonathan Bullivan
- Aroldo Tieri as Fats Missouri
- Licia Calderón as Suzanne
- María Silva as Clementine
- Antonio Molino Rojo as Smith, Missouri Lieutenant
- Félix Fernández as Barnun, Chicken Farmer
- Rafael Luis Calvo as Tornado
- Miguel Ángel Castillo as Card Player
- Claude Marshal as Bailarin
- Emilio Rodríguez as Missouri Henchman #2
- Fernando Hillbeck as Black Boy
- Antonio Vico as Macister
- Mac Ronay
- Román Ariznavarreta as Villager
- Agustín Bescos as Villager
- Xan das Bolas as Wagon Loader
- Juan Cazalilla as Villager
- Belinda Corel as Villageress
- Pedro Fenollar as Barman
- Venancio Muro as Barber
- Antonio Padilla as Fats Henchman
- María Pinar as Villageress
- Ángela Pla as Mrs. Barnun
- José Riesgo as Fats Henchman
- Alfonso Rojas as Dice Croupier
- Maruja Tamayo as Wagon Loader's Wife
- José Villasante as Bandit
