= Jorge Llopis =

Spanish satirist, actor and playwright

Jorge Llopis (1919–1976) was a Spanish satirist, actor and playwright best known for Los Pelópidas, a two-act satire of Greek tragedy, and for the parodic false anthology of the Spanish poetry Las mil peores poesías de la lengua castellana. After having success as a writer for humor magazines, he worked as a supporting actor in films during the 1960s.

== Filmography ==
Year	Title	Role	Notes
1943	El escándalo		
1961	Siempre es domingo	Don Eduardo	
1961	Pecado de amor		
1963	Los guerrilleros		
1963	Confidencias de un marido		
1964	El escándalo		
1964	Como dos gotas de agua		
1964	El espontáneo	Del Hotel	
1965	Destino: Barajas		
1966	Dollars for a Fast Gun	Marc	Uncredited
1966	De barro y oro		
1966	La muerte cumple condena		
1967	El filo del miedo	Don Antonio	
1967	Las 4 bodas de Marisol		(final film role)
