= María Luz Galicia =

Spanish actress

- Born: February 2, 1940 (age 86); Madrid, Spain
- Occupation: Actress
- Years active: 1953-1963 (film)

María Luz Galicia (born 1940) is a former Spanish film actress.

== Selected filmography ==
- Cabaret (1953)
- Good News (1954)
- Señora Ama (1955)
- El malvado Carabel (1956)
- Zorro the Avenger (1962)
- Shades of Zorro (1962)
- The Sign of the Coyote (1963)

== Bibliography ==
- Pitts, Michael R. Western Movies: A Guide to 5,105 Feature Films. McFarland, 2012.
- Thomas Weisser. Spaghetti Westerns--the Good, the Bad and the Violent: A Comprehensive, Illustrated Filmography of 558 Eurowesterns and Their Personnel, 1961–1977. McFarland, 2005.
