= Román Ariznavarreta =

Spanish actor and stuntman (born 1932)

- Born: Román Ariznavarreta González; 15 December 1932 (age 93); Madrid, Spain
- Occupations: Actor and stuntman

Román Ariznavarreta González (born 15 December 1932) is a Spanish actor and stuntman.

Ariznavarreta appeared in the spaghetti Westerns For a Few Dollars More (1965) and The Good, the Bad and the Ugly (1966), directed by Sergio Leone. He was a stuntman with Pablo Garcia in Hurricane (1979), directed by Jan Troell. He also appeared in Spanish films such as El Lute: camina o revienta (1987), directed by Vicente Aranda.

== Filmography ==
=== Film ===
- Zorro the Avenger (1962) as Soldado
- Terrible Sheriff (1962) as Villager (uncredited)
- The Sign of the Coyote (1963) as Lenny Henchman (uncredited)
- Implacable Three (1963) as Conductor diligencia (uncredited)
- Hour of Death (1964) as Teniente
- Gunmen of the Rio Grande (1964) as Pistolero
- Doomed Fort (1964) as Militar
- Relevo para un pistolero (1964) as Hombre de relampago
- Assault on Fort Texan (1965)
- For a Few Dollars More (1965) as Half-Shaved Bounty Hunter (uncredited)
- Ringo, the Mark of Vengeance (1966) as Jugador
- Return of the Magnificent Seven (1966) as Torero (uncredited)
- The Good, the Bad and the Ugly (1966) as Bounty Hunter (uncredited)
- Run Like a Thief (1967) as Ernie
- John the Bastard (1967) as Hermano de Gertrode (uncredited)
- Day of Anger (1967) as Wild Jack's Henchman (uncredited)
- Land Raiders (1970) as Indio
- ¡Qué cosas tiene el amor! (1973)
- Don Juan (1974, Short)
- Dick Turpin (1974) as Oficial 2
- Death Will Have Your Eyes (1974)
- Guerreras verdes (1976) as Gañan
- Where Time Began (1977)
- Avisa a Curro Jiménez (1978)
- El quinto mosquetero (1979)
- Rocky Carambola (1979)
- Más vale pájaro en mano (1980)
- Los cántabros (1980) as Gladiador
- Chispita y sus gorilas (1982) as Estúpido 5
- Hundra (1983) as Chieftain
- The Exterminators of the Year 3000 (1983)
- Yellow Hair and the Fortress of Gold (1984) as Machine Gun Soldier
- Policía (1987) as Guardaespaldas
- El Lute: Run for Your Life (1987) as Guardia Civil en foto
- Al acecho (1987)

=== Television ===
- Socrates (1970, TV Movie) as Calicle (uncredited)
- Curro Jiménez (1977)
- Los desastres de la guerra (1983)
- Celia (1993)
- El síndrome de Ulises (2007) as Matón
