= Robert Hundar =

Italian actor (1935–2008)

- Born: Claudio Undari; 12 January 1935; Castelvetrano, Province of Trapani
- Died: 12 May 2008 (aged 73); Rome, Italy
- Occupation: Actor
- Years active: 1956-2001

Claudio Undari (12 January 1935 – 12 May 2008), known professionally as Robert Hundar, was an Italian film actor and stage actor, best known for his roles of "Bad Guy" in Spaghetti Western and "Poliziottesco" movies. He starred in about 40 movies between 1960 and 1980.

== Biography ==
Born in Castelvetrano, Trapani and spent his youth in Catania. He debuted in 1956 and he then moved to Madrid to keep up his busy career. The first real star of Spaghetti western, as to be called "The King of Spaghetti westerns", Undari was forced to return to Italy when the glorious days of the spaghetti genre began to decline.

He died at home on 12 May 2008 at the age of 73.

== Selected filmography ==
- Roland the Mighty (1956) - Balicante
- Goliath and the Dragon (1960) - Polimorfeo
- Run with the Devil (1960) - Kristic
- The Joy of Living (1961) - Fascist
- Il segno del vendicatore (1962)
- Hawk of the Caribbean (1962) - Don Pedro de Alicante
- Marco Polo (1962) - Mongka
- The Shadow of Zorro (1962) - Billy
- Implacable Three (1963) - Niño McCoy
- Una sporca faccenda (1964) - Giocatore d'azzardo
- The Terror of Rome Against the Son of Hercules (1964) - Zefatius
- Three Ruthless Ones (1964) - Chet Walker
- Ride and Kill (1964) - Moody
- The Seven from Texas (1964) - Ringo
- Brandy (1964) - Moody
- Jesse James' Kid (1965) - Bill James
- The Relentless Four (1965) - Alan
- Dollars for a Fast Gun (1966) - Lassiter
- Ramon the Mexican (1966) - Ramon Morales
- Dakota Joe (1967) - Dakota Joe
- Death Rides Along (1967) - Luke Prentiss
- A Hole in the Forehead (1968) - General Munguya
- Il suo nome gridava vendetta (1968) - Clay Hackett
- A Hole in the Forehead (1968)
- Emma Hamilton (1968) - Le capitaine Hardy
- Battle of the Commandos (1969) - Pvt. Raymond Stone
- Sabata (1969) - Oswald, Stengel Henchman
- The Weekend Murders (1970) - Arthur, the valet
- Cut-Throats Nine (1972) - Sgt. Brown
- Mean Frank and Crazy Tony (1973) - Assassin
- The Fighting Fist of Shanghai Joe (1973) - Pedro, The Cannibal
- Lady Dynamite (1973)
- Dallas (1974) - Doug Bright
- Cormack of the Mounties (1975) - Wolf Seattle
- White Fang and the Gold Diggers (1975) - Barney Taft
- White Fang and the Hunter (1975) - Ferguson
- Free Hand for a Tough Cop (1976) - Mario
- The Cynic, the Rat and the Fist (1977) - Dario
- La bella e la bestia (1977) - The Tsar (segment "La schiava")
- California (1977) - Eric Plummer
- Star Odyssey (1979) - Galactic Auctioner
- Beast in Space (1980) - Onaf
- Everything Happens to Me (1980) - Alien Boss
- Animali metropolitani (1987) - Il Marchese (uncredited)
- Onorevoli detenuti (1998)
- Libero Burro (1999) - Tito
- Ponte Milvio (2000)
- The Knights of the Quest (2001)
- Three Days of Anarchy (2005)
