= Heroes of Fort Worth =

1965 film

- Directed by: Alberto De Martino (as Martin Herbert)
- Written by: Alberto De Martino, Eduardo Manzanos Brochero
- Produced by: Emo Bistolfi, Eduardo Manzanos Brochero, Arturo Marcos
- Starring: Edmund Purdom
- Cinematography: Eloy Mella Eastmancolor, Totalscope
- Music by: Manuel Parada, Carlo Rustichelli
- Distributed by: Variety Distribution
- Release date: 1965
- Running time: 100 minutes
- Country: Italy
- Language: Italian

Heroes of Fort Worth or Gli eroi di Fort Worth is a 1965 Italian Spaghetti Western film directed by Alberto De Martino.

== Plot ==
After the Civil War a band of Southerners with the aid of an Indian tribe, try to defeat a Union command while trying to gain support from Emperor Maximillian.

== Cast ==
- Edmund Purdom as Major 'Sugar' Patterson
- Paul Piaget as Major Sam Allison
- Priscila Steele as Nelly Patterson/Bonnet
- Monica Randal as Amanda
- Isarco Rabaioli as Lt. Webb
- Eduardo Fajardo as Col. George Bonnet
- Rafael Albaicin as Chief Wild Horse
- Umberto Raho as Colonel Maxfield
- Tullio Altamura as saloon owner
- Tomás Blanco as Confederate General
- José Marco as General Quantrill
- Rogelio Madrid
- Adolfo Arlés
- Emilio Rodríguez as Wagonmaster
- Víctor Bayo as Confederate Officer
- Francesco Sorna
- Francisco Vilches
- Gonzalo Esquiros
- Antonio Cuenca
- Román Ariznavarreta
- Antonio Orengo
- Ángel Alonso as Lt. Davis
- Edmundo Espinosa
- Leonidas Guerra
- Luis Barboo as Sub-Lieutenant of Bonnet
- Ricardo G. Lilló
