= Doc, Hands of Steel =

1965 film

- Directed by: Alfonso Balcázar
- Cinematography: Mario Capriotti
- Music by: Angelo Francesco Lavagnino
- Distributed by: Variety Distribution
- Release date: 1965
- Countries: Spain; Italy

Doc, Hands of Steel (Spanish: Doc, manos de plata, Italian: L'uomo dalla pistola d'oro, also known as The Man Who Came to Kill and Man with the Golden Pistol) is a 1965 Spanish-Italian Spaghetti Western film directed by Alfonso Balcázar.

== Cast ==
- Carl Möhner: Doc MacGregor
- Luis Dávila: Slade
- Fernando Sancho: Pablo Reyes
- Gloria Milland: Norma O'Connor
- Umberto Raho: Brogas
- Pedro Gil
- Franco Balducci
