= Paul Piaget (actor) =

Spanish actor (1934–1985)

- Born: Paul Piaget Ducurroy; 5 September 1934; Jerez de la Frontera
- Died: 1985 (aged 50–51); Madrid
- Occupation: Actor
- Children: Cristina Piaget

Paul Piaget Ducurroy (5 September 1934 – 1985) was a Spanish actor. He began his career as the stuntman of Charlton Heston in the film El Cid (1961). He has worked in a dozen of films, specializing in the western.

His daughter is the actress and model Cristina Piaget.

== Filmography ==
- El día de los enamorados (1959) as Repartidor
- Zorro the Avenger (1962) as Charlie
- Shades of Zorro (1962) as Dan
- Implacable Three (1963) as João Silveira
- Four Bullets for Joe (1964) as Frank Dalton
- Black Angel of the Mississippi (1964) as Cowboy
- Hour of Death (1964) as Bob Carey
- Assault on Fort Texan (1965) as Major Sam Allison (final film role)
