= Garringo =

1969 film

- Directed by: Rafael Romero Marchent
- Screenplay by: Arpad DeRiso; Joaquín Luis Romero Marchent; Giovanni Scolaro
- Story by: Joaquín Luis Romero Marchent; Giovanni Scolaro
- Produced by: Norberto Soliño
- Starring: Anthony Steffen; Peter Lee Lawrence; Solvi Stubing; José Bódalo; Raf Baldassarre
- Cinematography: Aldo Ricci
- Edited by: Enzo Alabiso; Ana María Romero Marchent
- Music by: Marcello Giombini
- Production companies: 21-Producciones; Profilms 21; Tritone Cinematografica
- Distributed by: Adria Filmverleih; Golden Era Film Distributors; Millennium Storm; Explosive-Media; Divisa Home Video; Interpeninsular; Wild East Productions
- Release date: 28 August 1969 (Italy)
- Running time: 84 min
- Countries: Spain; Italy
- Language: Spanish

Garringo (also known as Dead Are Countless) is a 1969 Spanish-Italian Spaghetti Western film written and directed by Rafael Romero Marchent.

== Cast ==
- Anthony Steffen as Lieutenant Garringo
- Peter Lee Lawrence as Johnny
- Solvi Stubing as Julie
- José Bódalo as Sheriff
- Raf Baldassarre as Damon
- Luis Marín as Pete, Bounty Hunter
- Marta Monterrey as Nancy Grayson
- Barta Barry as Wilson
- Rossana Rovere as Sarah
- Frank Braña as Bill
- Luis Induni as Doctor Grayson
- Guillermo Méndez as Johnny's Henchman
- Tito García as Ted
- Antonio Molino Rojo as Harriman
- Lorenzo Robledo as Deputy Sheriff
- Xan das Bolas as Potter
- Beni Deus as Padre de Johnny
- Rafael Hernández as Militar
- A. Lawrence as Johnny de niño
- Ángel Menéndez as Coronel
- Mario Morales as Telegrafista
- José Moreno as Fred
- Maribel del Pozo as Julie de niña
- Alfonso Rojas as Coronel
- Carlos Romero Marchent as Bob
- Santiago Santos as Amigo de Sam y Bill
