= James Philbrook =

American actor (1924–1982)

- Born: October 22, 1924; Lebanon, Pennsylvania, U.S.
- Died: October 24, 1982 (aged 58); Los Angeles, California, U.S.
- Occupation: Actor
- Years active: 1957-1975
- Spouse: Frances Cassling
- Children: 4

James Philbrook (October 22, 1924 – October 24, 1982) was an American actor who appeared in several major films, including I Want to Live! (1958), Woman Obsessed and as Colonel Tall in the 1964 war picture The Thin Red Line. He had supporting roles on television, including The Islanders (1960–61) and The New Loretta Young Show (1962 - 1963).

== Early years ==
Philbrook was born on October 22, 1924, in Lebanon, Pennsylvania, the son of Roland F. Philbrook, a clergyman. He attended St. Ambrose University and the University of Iowa, eventually completing an electrical engineering degree from the Massachusetts Institute of Technology in 1946.

A December 26, 1962, newspaper article reported on Philbrook's varied occupational experiences: "At various times, he's been a miner, a rodeo performer, a gym instructor, a writer, a photographer — you name, he's done it with various degrees of success."

== Military service ==
Philbrook was an aviation electronics specialist for the Navy for four years during the Korean War. He was stationed in Africa, the Aleutian Islands, China, Europe, and India.

== Personal life ==
Philbrook was married to the former Frances Cassling. They had four children.

== Death ==
Philbrook died on October 24, 1982, at Los Angeles, California.

== Filmography ==
Year	Title	Role	Notes
1957	Alfred Hitchcock Presents	Horse Mover	Season 2 Episode 35: "The West Warlock Time Capsule"
1958	From Hell to Texas	Bartender	Uncredited
1958	In Love and War	Sue's Boyfriend	Uncredited
1958	I Want to Live!	Bruce King	
1959	Warlock	Cade	Uncredited
1959	Perry Mason	Harry Jonson	Season 2 Episode 30 "The Case of the Lame Canary"
1959	Woman Obsessed	Henri	
1962	The Wild Westerners	Marshal Jim McDowell	
1963	Perry Mason	Harrison Burke	Season 6 Episode 22 "The Case of the Velvet Claws"
1964	The Thin Red Line	Colonel Tall	
1965	Finger on the Trigger	Adam Hyde	
1965	Son of a Gunfighter	James 'Ace' Ketchum	
1966	Sound of Horror	Dr. Pete Asilov	
1966	The Drums of Tabu	Bill Harrigan	
1966	El arte de casarse	Colonel W. P. Morgan	(segment "Profesor de matrimonio")
1966	Two Thousand Dollars for Coyote	Sam Foster	
1967	Los 7 de Pancho Villa	Sheriff of Cerezo	
1968	Ballad of a Bounty Hunter	Don Ramon	
1969	La muchacha del Nilo	James	
1970	El último día de la guerra	Lieutenant Poole	
1975	The Killer is Not Alone	Don Enrique Nieto	
1975	Si quieres vivir… dispara	Sam	(final film role)
