= Lorenzo Robledo =

Spanish film actor (1918–2006)

- Born: 3 July 1918; Madrid, Spain
- Died: September 2006 (aged 88); Madrid, Spain
- Occupation: Film actor

Lorenzo Robledo (3 July 1918 – September 2006) was a Spanish film actor, who made over 85 appearances in film between 1956 and 1982. He is a familiar face in Italian Westerns, having appeared in a total of 32 spaghetti Westerns throughout the 1960s and early 1970s.

Robledo is probably best known for his roles in Sergio Leone's spaghetti Westerns of the 1960s and 1970s, portraying minor characters in the trilogy of films A Fistful of Dollars (1964), For a Few Dollars More (1965), The Good, the Bad and the Ugly (1966), and Once Upon a Time in the West in 1968. He acted in many other Westerns prolifically including the tortured sheriff in Four of the Apocalypse (1975).

His most notable role in Leone's films (where he is more recognizable) is in For a Few Dollars More when he plays the character of a cornered enemy of the main evil villain who tortures him and murders his family before killing him.

Robledo died in September 2006 in Madrid.

== Selected filmography ==
- Todos somos necesarios (1956)
- Manolo, guardia urbano (1956) - Cliente del bar (uncredited)
- Heroes del Aire (1958) - Soldado que bebe coñac (uncredited)
- El hincha (1958)
- Red Cross Girls (1958) - Periodista (uncredited)
- Farmacia de guardia (1958)
- Azafatas con permiso (1959) - Otro amigo de Alberto
- María de la O (1959)
- El cerro de los locos (1960) - Valentín
- Culpables (1960) - Alberto
- La reina del Tabarín (1960) - Espectador en la calle
- El príncipe encadenado (1960)
- Taxi for Tobruk (1961) - German Soldier in Desert with von Stegel (uncredited)
- El hombre del expreso de Oriente (1962)
- La venganza del Zorro (1962) - Oficial
- Tómbola (1962) - Conductor
- The Carpet of Horror (1962) - Sam
- Cupido contrabandista (1962)
- L'ombra di Zorro (1962) - Capitan
- Perseo l'invincibile (1963) - Prince (uncredited)
- Plaza de oriente (1963)
- Rocío de La Mancha (1963)
- Implacable Three (1963) - Ray Logan
- Noches de Casablanca (1963)
- Pacto de silencio (1963)
- Gibraltar (1964)
- Coplan, agent secret FX 18 (1964) - Alfonso
- Crucero de verano (1964)
- Fuera de la ley (1964)
- A Fistful of Dollars (1964) - Baxter Gunman #1 (uncredited)
- Alféreces provisionales (1964) - Capitán Córdoba (uncredited)
- The Seven from Texas (1964) - Capitan
- La tumba del pistolero (1964) - Sbirro
- Rueda de sospechosos (1964) - Enrique
- Relevo para un pistolero (1964) - Dan
- Black Eagle of Santa Fe (1965) - Messenger (uncredited)
- Aventuras del Oeste (1965) - Charlie
- Los cuatreros (1965) - Kenton
- Corrida pour un espion (1965) - Cdt F24 (uncredited)
- Fall of the Mohicans (1965) - Commander
- Hands of a Gunfighter (1965) - Slim Castle
- Agent 077 From the Orient with Fury (1965) - Mike
- The Relentless Four (1965) - Comisario
- For a Few Dollars More (1965) - Tomaso, Indio's Traitor
- Z7 Operation Rembrandt (1966) - Colonello
- Cartes sur table (1966) - Commissaire Molynski (uncredited)
- Zampo y yo (1965) - Los de la oficina
- Per il gusto di uccidere (1966) - Sheriff
- For a Few Extra Dollars (1966) - Captain Taylor
- Navajo Joe (1966) - Robledo - Member of Duncan's Gang
- The Big Gundown (1966) - Dave, Pioneer (uncredited)
- The Good, the Bad and the Ugly (1966) - Clem, Member of Angel Eyes' Gang
- Con la muerte a la espalda (1967) - Electra Agent
- Face to Face (1967) - Wallace (uncredited)
- Train for Durango (1968) - Safe Guard (uncredited)
- A Minute to Pray, a Second to Die (1968) - Bounty Hunter (uncredited)
- All'ultimo sangue (1968) - Gunman (uncredited)
- ...dai nemici mi guardo io! (1968) - Jack Garland (uncredited)
- Los que tocan el piano (1968) - Entrenador
- Uno a uno sin piedad (1968) - Bartender
- The Cats (1968)
- They Came to Rob Las Vegas (1968) - Man at Control Center (uncredited)
- The Mercenary (1968) - Officer
- Once Upon a Time in the West (1968) - 2nd Member of Cheyenne's Gang (uncredited)
- Taste of Vengeance (1968) - Bandit Leader
- Cemetery Without Crosses (1969) - Rogers Ranch Hand (uncredited)
- El taxi de los conflictos (1969) - Policía
- Battle of the Commandos (1969) - Private Bernard Knowles
- Garringo (1969) - Deputy Sheriff Tom
- A Bullet for Sandoval (1969) - Confederate Corporal (uncredited)
- The Price of Power (1969) - Brett (uncredited)
- Manos torpes (1970)
- Un par de asesinos (1970) - Deputy
- Arriva Sabata! (1970) - Man in Sheriff's Office
- Compañeros (1970) - Captain Jim
- Uccidi Django... uccidi per primo!!! (1971)
- Un aller simple (1971) - (uncredited)
- Si estás muerto, ¿por qué bailas? (1971) - McClintey
- Boulevard du Rhum (1971) - Un tireur (uncredited)
- Su le mani, cadavere! Sei in arresto (1971) - Ballor
- Long Live Your Death (1971) - Mr. Callofen (uncredited)
- La cera virgen (1972)
- La garbanza negra, que en paz descanse... (1972)
- Cerco de terror (1972) - Willy
- Un dólar de recompensa (1972) - Mathathy Johnson, Barber (uncredited)
- Dans la poussière du soleil (1972) - Swann
- Condenados a vivir (1972) - Soldier
- Sonny and Jed (1972) - Croupier (uncredited)
- Il coltello di ghiaccio (1972) - Vice-commissioner
- What Am I Doing in the Middle of a Revolution? (1972)
- Secuestro a la española (1972)
- The Scarlet Letter (1973) - Captain
- Ricco (1973)
- The Sibyl Cipher (1973)
- Fasthand (1973) - Jack, Hearse Driver (uncredited)
- Santo contra el doctor Muerte (1973)
- Las señoritas de mala compañía (1973) - Mozo 3
- Onofre (1974) - Comisario
- El padrino y sus ahijadas (1974) - Defensor
- Odio mi cuerpo (1974) - Cliente del Night Club
- Vacaciones sangrientas (1974)
- The White, the Yellow, and the Black (1975) - Colonel
- Four of the Apocalypse (1975) - Sheriff Being Tortured (uncredited)
- Night of the Walking Dead (1975) - Patrick
- El comisario G. en el caso del cabaret (1975)
- Con la música a otra parte (1975)
- Muerte de un quinqui (1975)
- El libro de buen amor II (1976) - Justicia
- Guerreras verdes (1976) - Guardia Civil
- Un día con Sergio (1977) - Camarero
- El espiritista (1977)
- Cabo de vara (1978) - (final film role)
