= Gunmen of the Rio Grande =

1964 film

- US film poster
- Directed by: Tulio Demicheli
- Written by: Guy Lionel; Gene Luotto; Natividad Zaro; Tulio Demicheli
- Produced by: Italo Zingarelli (credited as Ike Zingarmann)
- Starring: Guy Madison; Madeleine Lebeau; Fernando Sancho
- Cinematography: Mario Capriotti
- Music by: Angelo Francesco Lavagnino
- Distributed by: Allied Artists (US)
- Release date: 19 November 1964
- Running time: 85 minutes
- Country: Italy
- Language: Italian

Gunmen of the Rio Grande (Spanish: Desafío en Río Bravo, Italian: Sfida a Rio Bravo, French: Duel à Rio Bravo) is a 1964 Spaghetti Western film directed by Tulio Demicheli. An Italian, Spanish and French international co-production, it was filmed at Almería, Spain and shot in Techniscope. It stars Guy Madison as Wyatt Earp in his first leading spaghetti western role.

== Plot ==
Saloon keeper Jennie Lee is fed up with Zack "The Snake" Williams trying to take over Clementine Hewitt's silver mine. She contacts her friend Wyatt Earp to bring justice to the Arizona Territory.

== Cast ==
- Guy Madison as Wyatt Earp
- Fernando Sancho as Pancho Bogan
- Madeleine Lebeau as Jennie Lee
- Gérard Tichy as Zack Williams
- Carolyn Davys as Clementine Hewitt
- Beni Deus as Traidor
- Olivier Hussenot as Judge
- Massimo Serato as Leo
- Román Ariznavarreta as Pistolero
- Xan das Bolas as Peon
- Álvaro de Luna as Pistolero
- Juan Maján
- E. Maran
- Dario Michaelis
- H. Morrow
- Juanito Santiago as Niño
- Claudio Scarchilli
- Pilar Vela
- Natividad Zaro
