= Joaquín Luis Romero Marchent =

Spanish film director and producer

- Born: 26 August 1921; Madrid, Spain
- Died: 16 August 2012 (aged 90); Madrid, Spain
- Occupations: Screenwriter and film director
- Years active: 1949–1995
- Father: Joaquín Romero Marchent Gómez de Avellaneda (1899–1973)
- Relatives: Rafael Romero Marchent (1926–2020); Ana María Romero Marchent; Carlos Romero Marchent (1944–2013)

Joaquín Luis Romero Marchent (26 August 1921 – 16 August 2012) was a Spanish screenwriter and film director. He directed several Spaghetti Westerns during the 1960s.

He died on 16 August 2012 at the age of 91 in Madrid.

== Filmography ==
- Curro Jiménez: El regreso de una leyenda (1995)
- Las fantasías de Cuny (1984)
- Despido improcedente (1980)
- Curro Jiménez (1976-1978)
- Tu dios y mi infierno (1976)
- El clan de los Nazarenos (1975)
- El juego del adulterio (1973)
- Man with the Golden Winchester (1973)
- Cut-Throats Nine (1972)
- Un par de asesinos (1970)
- Dead Are Countless (1969)
- I Do Not Forgive... I Kill! (1968)
- Dollars for a Fast Gun (1966)
- Three Ruthless Ones (1966)
- The Tough One (1966)
- El enigma de los Cornell (1965)
- Seven Hours of Gunfire (1965)
- Hotel of Dead Guests (1965)
- Hour of Death (1964)
- Tres hombres buenos (1963)
- Shades of Zorro (1962)
- Zorro the Avenger (1962)
- Ella y los veteranos (1961)
- Festival (1961)
- El hombre del paraguas blanco (1958)
- Fulano y Mengano (1957)
- El hombre que viajaba despacito (1957)
- The Coyote's Justice (1956)
- The Coyote (1955)
- Sor Angélica (1954)
- Juzgado permanente (1953)
- Gypsy Curse (1953)
- Luna de sangre (1952)
- María Morena (1951)
- La revoltosa (1950)
- Peace (1949)
- Loyola, the Soldier Saint (1949)

== Bibliography ==
- de España, Rafael. Directory of Spanish and Portuguese film-makers and films. Greenwood Press, 1994.
