= Seven Hours of Gunfire =

1965 film

Aventuras del Oeste
- Directed by: Joaquín Luis Romero Marchent
- Written by: Joaquín Luis Romero Marchent; Ángel de Zavala (book)
- Starring: Rik Van Nutter; Adrian Hoven; Kurt Großkurth
- Music by: Angelo Francesco Lavagnino
- Release date: 1965
- Running time: 76 minutes
- Countries: Spain; Italy
- Language: Spanish

Seven Hours of Gunfire (Spanish: Aventuras del Oeste, Italian: Sette ore di fuoco) is a 1965 Spanish-Italian Spaghetti Western film directed by Joaquín Luis Romero Marchent (as José Hernandez).

== Cast ==
- Rik Van Nutter as Buffalo Bill (as Clyde Rogers)
- Adrian Hoven as Wild Bill Hickok
- Kurt Großkurth as August Mai
- Helga Sommerfeld as Cora
- Gloria Milland as Calamity Jane
- Robert Johnson Jr.
- Carlos Romero Marchent
- Helga Liné
- Alfonso Rojas as Colonel Carr
- Antonio Molino Rojo
- Francisco Sanz as Pastor Lieberman
- Raf Baldassarre as Guillermo
- Cris Huerta as Steve
- María Esther Vázquez as Agnese
