= Gloria Milland =

Italian actress (1940–1989)

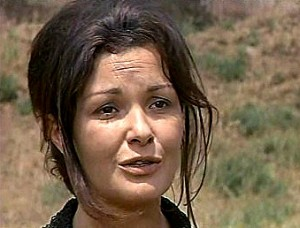
- Gloria Milland as Maria in the movie Odio per odio (1967)
- Born: Maria Fiè; 11 October 1940; Cagliari, Kingdom of Italy
- Died: 27 August 1989 (aged 48); Ladispoli, Rome, Italy
- Occupation: Actress
- Years active: 1959–1967

Gloria Milland (born Maria Fiè; 11 October 1940 – 27 August 1989) was an Italian actress of peplum and spaghetti Western films.

== Life ==
Born in Cagliari, she debuted in 1959 with her real name, but changed it shortly after, following a fashion of the time for American-sounding stage names. In 1960s she was very active in light comedies and adventure (pepla) films, often in main roles, then did a few spaghetti westerns, but dissatisfied with her career, she chose to retire from show business in the late 1960s.

Milland died on August 27, 1989, in Ladispoli, Italy.

== Filmography ==
- 1959: Fantasmi e ladri
- 1959: Girl at the club - Girl at the club
- 1960: La strada dei giganti
- 1960: My Friend, Dr. Jekyll - Mara
- 1960: Rapina al quartiere Ovest
- 1960: Ferragosto in bikini - Elena
- 1961: The Thief of Baghdad - Amina's Handmaid (uncredited)
- 1961: Goliath Against the Giants - Princess Elea
- 1961: Bellezze sulla spiaggia
- 1961: Scandali al mare - Nicoletta
- 1961: Le magnifiche sette - Erika
- 1962: Ten Italians for One German - Assunta a.k.a. Nena - Ferroni's wife
- 1962: The Golden Arrow - Queen in the save
- 1962: The Fury of Achilles - Briseis
- 1962: The Rebel Gladiators - Marzia
- 1962: Twist, lolite e vitelloni - Elena
- 1963: The Black Duke - Caterina Sforza
- 1963: Goliath and the Rebel Slave - Zoé
- 1963: Le tre spade di Zorro - Virginia
- 1964: Revenge of the Musketeers - Olimpia Mancini
- 1964: Samson vs. the Giant King - Nadia
- 1964: Delitto allo specchio - Franca
- 1964: Hercules Against the Barbarians - Arias
- 1964: I tre spietati - Louise Walker
- 1964: The Seven from Texas - Maria
- 1965: Challenge of the Gladiator - Livia
- 1965: Seven Hours of Gunfire - Calamity Jane
- 1965: Hands of a Gunfighter - Miriam Murphy
- 1965: Doc, Hands of Steel - Norma O'Connor
- 1966: The Tough One
- 1967: ...E divenne il più spietato bandito del sud - Mrs. Kathleen Bonney
- 1967: Aquí mando yo - Elisa
- 1967: Hate for Hate - Maria Consuelo Cooper
- 1967: Un uomo e una colt - Carmencita (final film role)
