= Zorro the Avenger =

1962 film

- Spanish: La venganza del Zorro
- Directed by: Joaquín Luis Romero Marchent
- Screenplay by: Jesús Franco; Joaquín Romero Hernández
- Story by: Jesús Franco; Joaquín Romero Hernández
- Starring: Frank Latimore; María Luz Galicia
- Cinematography: Rafael Pacheco
- Music by: Manuel Parada
- Production companies: Copercines, Cooperativa Cinematográfica
- Distributed by: Columbia-Bavaria Filmgesellschaft m.b.H.; Exclusivas Floralva Distribución S.A.; Juvensa; Something Weird Video (SWD); Warner Bros. Television
- Release date: 5 June 1962 (Madrid)
- Running time: 90 min
- Country: Spain

Zorro the Avenger (Spanish: La venganza del Zorro), a.k.a. The Shadow of Zorro, is a 1962 Spanish adventure western film directed by Joaquín Luis Romero Marchent, and starring Frank Latimore, María Luz Galicia, Howard Vernon, María Andersen and Ralph March.

It was one of the hits of the time from the western films. This film supposed a successor to the character of Coyote in films like La justicia del Coyote (1955).

== Cast ==
- Frank Latimore as Don José de la Torre / El Zorro (voiced by Ángel María Baltanás)
- María Luz Galicia as Maria Aguilar
- Ralph March as Juan Aguilar
- Howard Vernon as The General Clarence (voiced by José Guardiola)
- María Silva as Irene (voiced by María del Puy)
- Paul Piaget as Charlie (voiced by Jesús Puente)
- Manuel Alexandre as Soldado (voiced Hipólito de Diego)
- María Andersen as Juana (voiced Celia Honrubia)
- Román Ariznavarreta as Soldado
- Juan Antonio Arévalo as Fernando
- Xan das Bolas as Soldado
- José Marco Davó as Gobernador
- Alfonso de la Vega as Soldado
- Fernando Delgado as Padre Francisco
- Irán Eory as Amiga de Irene
- Antonio Molino Rojo as Rock (voiced by García Antolín)
- Guillermo Méndez as Profesor de esgrima (voiced by Hipólito de Diego)
- Antonio Padilla as Sargento
- José Riesgo as Ciudadano
- Lorenzo Robledo as Official (voiced by Benjamín Domingo)
- Emilio Rodríguez as John (voiced by Vicente Bañó)
- Jesús Tordesillas as Raimundo
- José Villasante as Soldado
- Ángel Álvarez as Ciudadano
