= Ballad of a Bounty Hunter =

1968 film by Joaquín Luis Romero Marchent

- Directed by: Joaquín Luis Romero Marchent
- Written by: Víctor Auz; José Luis Hernández Marcos; Bautista Lacasa; Joaquín Luis Romero Marchent; Giovanni Simonelli
- Produced by: José Luis Jerez Aloza
- Starring: James Philbrook; Norma Bengell; Simón Andreu
- Cinematography: Fulvio Testi
- Edited by: Mercedes Alonso
- Music by: Piero Piccioni
- Distributed by: Troma Entertainment
- Release date: 1968
- Running time: 81 minutes
- Countries: Spain; Italy
- Language: Spanish

Ballad of a Bounty Hunter (also known as Fedra West and I Do Not Forgive... I Kill!) is a 1968 Italian-Spanish western film directed by Joaquín Luis Romero Marchent and distributed by Troma Entertainment.

== Cast ==
- James Philbrook: Don Ramón
- Norma Bengell: Fedra
- Simón Andreu: Stuart
- Emilio Gutiérrez Caba: José
- María Silva: Isabelle Álvarez
- Alfonso Rojas: Julio Álvarez
- Luis Induni: Fedras Bruder
- Maria Cumani Quasimodo: María
- Giancarlo Bastianoni: Outlaw
- Álvaro de Luna: Outlaw
