= Implacable Three =

1963 film by Joaquín Luis Romero Hernández Marchent

- Spanish: Tres hombres buenos
- Directed by: Joaquin L. Romero Marchent
- Screenplay by: Joaquin Romero Marchent
- Story by: José Mallorquí
- Produced by: Norberto Soliño
- Starring: Paul Piaget; Fernando Sancho; Robert Hundar; Charito del Río
- Cinematography: Rafael Pacheco
- Edited by: Mercedes Alonso
- Music by: Manuel Parada
- Production companies: Copercines, Cooperativa Cinematográfica; Produzioni Europee Associate
- Distributed by: Schneider-Filmverleih; Exclusivas Floralva Distribución S.A.; Something Weird Video
- Release date: 16 May 1963 (Italy)
- Running time: 86 min
- Countries: Spain; Italy

Implacable Three (Spanish: Tres hombres buenos, Italian: I tre implacabili) is a 1963 Spanish/Italian mystery western film directed by Joaquín Luis Romero Marchent, written by José Mallorquí and starring Geoffrey Horne, Paul Piaget and Fernando Sancho, it is considered one of the earliest Spaghetti Western films.

It was one of several European films Geoffrey Horne starred in following his success in Bridge on the River Kwai.

== Cast ==
- Geoffrey Horne as César Guzmán
- Paul Piaget as João Silveira
- Fernando Sancho as Diego Abriles
- Robert Hundar as Niño McCoy
- Raf Baldassarre as Comisario Molero
- Charito del Río as Lola
- Cristina Gajoni as Marisol Benavente
- Turia Nelson as Ana Lupe
- Fernando Montes as Sheriff José María Cáceres
- John McDouglas as Bardon
- Maximo Carocci as Rex
- Santiago Rivero as Don Julio Benavente
- Antonio Gradoli as Alcalde Samuel Hopkins
- Xan das Bolas as Cartero
- Emilio Rodríguez as Hombre de Bardon
- Lorenzo Robledo as Ray Logan
- Antonio Padilla as Hotelero
- Rufino Inglés as Sanders
- Pedro Rodríguez de Quevedo as Bádenas
- Aldo Sambrell as Hombre de Bardon
- Gonzalo Esquiroz as Hombre de McCoy
- Simón Arriaga as Hombre de McCoy
- Jose Farber
- Marco Visconti
- V. Fernández
- Faustino Cosmes
- Manuel Lugris
- Miguel de la Riva as Hombre de Bardon
- Emilio Berrio as Ciudadano
- Antonio Sanabria
- Jesús Guzmán as Tendero-funerario
- S. Madariaga
- Miguel Merino in a bit part
- Francisco Montalvo as Lucas
- Enrique Navarro as Herrero
- Faustino Cornejo as Barman
- José L. Ferreiro
- Juan Antonio Peral as Hombre de McCoy
- Román Ariznavarreta as Conductor diligencia
