= Antonio Molino Rojo =

Spanish actor (1926–2011)

- Born: 14 September 1926; Venta de Baños, province of Palencia, Castilla y León, Spain
- Died: 2 November 2011 (aged 85); Barcelona, Cataluña, Spain
- Occupation: Film actor

Antonio Molino Rojo (14 September 1926 – 2 November 2011) was a Spanish film actor who appeared primarily in Spaghetti Westerns in the 1960s and 1970s.

== Biography ==
He made nearly 90 appearances in film between 1955 and 1988 but is probably most recognizable in western cinema for his roles in the Sergio Leone trilogy of Spaghetti Westerns A Fistful of Dollars (1964), For a Few Dollars More (1965), and The Good, the Bad and the Ugly in 1966. He also appeared in the Sergio Leone picture Once Upon a Time in the West in 1968, in 4 Dollars of Revenge (1966), etc.

Rojo did not always play gang members in the westerns; in The Good, the Bad and the Ugly, Rojo portrayed a humane commandant at a Union prisoner-of-war camp whose leg was being eroded by gangrene. In the film he told Angel Eyes (Lee Van Cleef) that he knew he was systematically torturing and robbing the Confederate prisoners, and hoped that before he died, he could amass enough evidence to bring Angel Eyes to trial at a court martial.

Rojo died in Barcelona on 2 November 2011 at aged 85.

== Selected filmography ==
- La trinca del aire (1951)
- Such is Madrid (1953) – Bailarín (uncredited)
- El mensaje (1954)
- El torero (1954) – Hombre con bebé en el aeropuerto (uncredited)
- The Other Life of Captain Contreras (1955)
- El coyote (1955)
- Mr. Arkadin (1955) – (uncredited)
- Mañana cuando amanezca (1955)
- La chica del barrio (1956) – Chulo en verbena (uncredited)
- We Thieves Are Honourable (1956) – Invitado de la fiesta (uncredited)
- El fenómeno (1956) – Pavlovsky
- El malvado Carabel (1956) – Oficinista (uncredited)
- La ironía del dinero (1957) – (uncredited)
- Maravilla (1957) – Felipe
- Juan Simón's Daughter (1957) – Amigo de Alfonso
- Fulano y Mengano (1957) – Preso
- Trapped in Tangier (1957) – Pérez
- ...Y eligió el infierno (1957)
- Muchachas de azul (1957)
- Aquellos tiempos del cuplé (1958)
- El hincha (1958) – Arquitecto
- La vida por delante (1958) – Agente del autocar
- Gli zitelloni (1958)
- Una muchachita de Valladolid (1958)
- La ragazza di Piazza San Pietro (1958)
- Red Cross Girls (1958) – Periodista (uncredited)
- Ya tenemos coche (1958) – Guardia urbano
- Entierro de un funcionario en primavera (1958) – Novio (uncredited)
- 15 bajo la lona (1959)
- Parque de Madrid (1959)
- La novia de Juan Lucero (1959)
- Salto a la gloria (1959)
- Venta de Vargas (1959)
- Azafatas con permiso (1959) – Amigo de Alberto
- Una gran señora (1959) – Amigo de Willy (uncredited)
- S.O.S., abuelita (1959)
- El Lazarillo de Tormes (1959) – Alguacil (Bailiff)
- Y después del cuplé (1959)
- Juicio final (1960)
- The Showgirl (1960)
- A Ray of Light (1960) – Carlos
- One Step Forward (1960)
- An American in Toledo (1960)
- El príncipe encadenado (1960)
- Sentencia contra una mujer (1960)
- El vagabundo y la estrella (1960)
- The Invincible Gladiator (1961) – Euclante
- Rosa de Lima (1961)
- No dispares contra mí (1961) – Kroback
- La mentira tiene cabellos rojos (1962) – Amigo de Enrique
- La venganza del Zorro (1962) – Rock
- Guns of Darkness (1962) – Revolutionary Officer
- Sabían demasiado (1962)
- Escuela de seductoras (1962) – Mr. Curtis
- Gladiators 7 (1962) – Macrobius
- Due contro tutti (1962) – Smith, Missouri Lieutenant
- Cupido contrabandista (1962)
- Perseo l'invincibile (1963) – Tarpete
- Esa pícara pelirroja (1963) – Fabricante lavadoras suizo #1
- Sandokan the Great (1963) – Tenente Toymby
- Los muertos no perdonan (1963) – Inspector Solandes
- Gibraltar (1964) – Thug
- Bienvenido, padre Murray (1964) – Monty
- A Fistful of Dollars (1964) – Baxter Gunman #2 (uncredited)
- Texas Ranger (1964) – Perkins
- Alféreces provisionales (1964) – Teniente de la Academia (uncredited)
- Saul e David (1964)
- Finger on the Trigger (1965) – Benham
- Aventuras del Oeste (1965) – Dittle
- Five Thousand Dollars on One Ace (1965) – Dingus
- The Hell of Manitoba (1965) – Sam
- That Man in Istanbul (1965) – Barrett
- Man from Canyon City (1965) – Matt
- For a Few Dollars More (1965) – Frisco (Indio's Gang) (uncredited)
- Ringo's Big Night (1966) – (uncredited)
- Seven Guns for the MacGregors (1966) – Sheriff
- Seven Golden Men Strike Again (1966)
- Cuatro dólares de venganza (1966) – Dave Griffith
- Kiss Kiss...Bang Bang (1966) – Texas Millionaire (uncredited)
- Culpable para un delito (1966) – Kleiber
- The Sea Pirate (1966) – Andre Chambles
- For a Few Extra Dollars (1966) – Brian, Confederate Officer
- Five for Revenge (1966) – El Matanza
- The Texican (1966) – Harv
- The Big Gundown (1966) – Widow's ranchero
- Il grande colpo di Surcouf (1966)
- The Good, the Bad and the Ugly (1966) – Captain Harper
- El hombre que mató a Billy el Niño (1967) – Tom MacGregor
- El dedo del destino (1967)
- Operación cabaretera (1967) – Marinero de guardia 2
- 15 Scaffolds for a Murderer (1967) – Sheriff
- A Minute to Pray, a Second to Die (1968) – Sein (uncredited)
- Once Upon a Time in the West (1968) – Member of Frank's Gang at Auction (uncredited)
- O.K. Yevtushenko (1968) – General Borodin
- Kill Them All and Come Back Alone (1968) – Sergeant
- Battle of the Commandos (1969) – Private Albert Hank
- Garringo (1969) – Harriman
- A Bullet for Sandoval (1969)
- Hola... señor Dios (1970) – Revisor / Gaspar
- Veinte pasos para la muerte (1970)
- Manos torpes (1970) – Frank
- La diligencia de los condenados (1970) – Buchanan (uncredited)
- Los buitres cavarán tu fosa (1971) – El Rojo
- Un colt por cuatro cirios (1971) – Farley
- Lo ammazzò come un cane... ma lui rideva ancora (1972) – Ramson
- Horror Story (1972)
- Now They Call Him Sacramento (1972) – Mr. Cray, Banker
- La redada (1973) – Gino
- La muerte incierta (1973) – Clive Dawson
- My Name Is Nobody (1973) – U.S. Army Officer (uncredited)
- El último viaje (1974) – Harold Shiffel
- Una cuerda al amanecer (1974)
- Las correrías del Vizconde Arnau (1974) – Tonino
- Killing of the Dolls (1975) – Sir Arthur
- Relación matrimonial y otras cosas (1975)
- La isla de las vírgenes ardientes (1977)
- Los violadores del amanecer (1978) – Padre de Rafi
- La ciudad maldita (1978) – Peter
- Inés de Villalonga 1870 (1979) – Sacerdote
- Companys, procés a Catalunya (1979) – Oficial Gestapo
- Estigma (1980) – Jorge
- Virus (1980) – SWAT Leader (uncredited)
- Viaje al más allá (1980) – Sacerdote
- Patrizia (1981) – Sam
- Los violadores (1981) – Encargado del párking (uncredited)
- Sechs Schwedinnen auf Ibiza (1981) – Greta's Boss (uncredited)
- Playa azul (1982) – Marcello Donizetti
- Bacanales romanas (1982) – César
- Catherine Chérie (1982) – Inspector Molina (uncredited)
- Samanka (1982)
- Acosada (1985) – Comisario de Policía
- Más allá de la muerte (1986) – Inspector Castillo
- La diputada (1988) – Político
- Sinatra (1988) – Encargado Bingo (final film role)
