= The Tough One =

1966 film

- Directed by: Joaquín Luis Romero Marchent
- Starring: John Richardson, Gloria Milland, Evi Marandi, Fernando Sancho
- Cinematography: Federico Gutiérrez-Larraya
- Music by: Gianni Ferrio
- Release date: 15 December 1966
- Running time: 98 minutes
- Countries: Spain; Italy
- Language: Spanish

The Tough One (Spanish: El aventurero de Guaynas, Italian: Gringo, getta il fucile!) is a 1966 Spanish/Italian spaghetti Western directed by Joaquín Luis Romero Marchent and starring John Richardson.
