= The Seven from Texas =

1964 film

- Directed by: Joaquín Luis Romero Marchent
- Starring: Paul Piaget; Robert Hundar
- Cinematography: Fausto Zuccoli
- Music by: Riz Ortolani
- Release date: 6 November 1964
- Countries: Spain; Italy
- Language: Spanish

The Seven from Texas ( Spanish: Antes llega la muerte, Italian: I sette del Texas, also known as Seven Guns from Texas and Hour of Death) is a 1964 Spanish-Italian Western film directed by Joaquín Luis Romero Marchent. It was shown as part of a retrospective on Spaghetti Western at the 64th Venice International Film Festival.

== Cast ==
- Paul Piaget as Bob Carey
- Robert Hundar as Ringo
- Gloria Milland as Maria
- Del Karmel as Rogers
- Fernando Sancho as Scommetti, the half-breed
- Jesús Puente as Clifford
- Paco Sanz as Rogers
- Ralph Baldwyn as Jess
- Antonio Gandía as Bob
- Beni Deus as Dan
- Gregory Wu as Lin Chu
- Luis Induni as Donald
- Indio González
- Álvaro de Luna as Burns
- Lorenzo Robledo as Capitan
- Ricardo Rodríguez as Indio
- Alfonso Rojas as Harvey
- Emilio Rodríguez as Capitan
- Emilio Berrio
- Pedro Fenollar as Doctor
- Román Ariznavarreta as Teniente
- John Bartha as Dan
