= Sara Lezana =

Spanish flamenco dancer, choreographer and actress (born 1948)

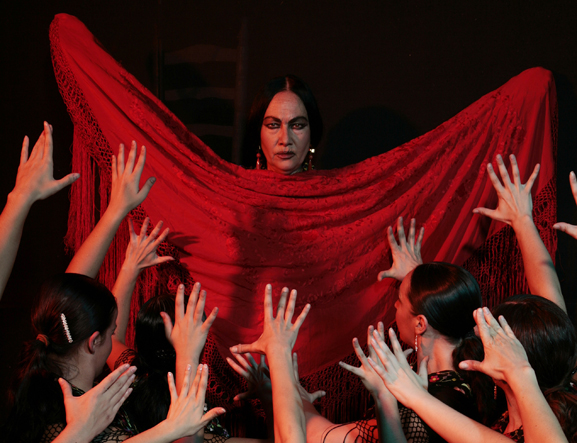
- Sara Lezana in 2007
- Born: Sara Lezana Mínguez; 5 March 1948 (age 77); Madrid
- Occupation(s): Flamenco dancer and actress

Sara Lezana Mínguez (born 5 March 1948) is a Spanish flamenco dancer, choreographer and actress.

In 1960, she made her debut on Teatro Valle Inclán in Madrid with Historia de los Tarantos, by Alfredo Mañas. Then she made her film debut on Los Tarantos with Carmen Amaya, and then she appeared in En el extraño viaje by Fernando Fernán Gómez, La búsqueda by Angelino Fons, La Carmen along Julián Mateos, Casa Manchada along Stephen Boyd, Donde hay patrón... along Manolo Escobar, and Historia de S. She appeared in Spaghetti Western films like Gunfight at Red Sands (1963), Fall of the Mohicans (1965), and Murieta (1963). She worked with the actor Daniel Martín and the torero Palomo Linares.

In 1968 she started her own dance business, Ballet Flamenco de Madrid, and between 1970 and 1980 she worked in Japan, United States, Canada, South America and Europe. She worked with the guitarist Pepín Salazar. In 1980 she opened a property, Casa Sara, for which she worked with the guitarists Paco Izquierdo and Rafael Andújar, and the singers Antonio "Cuquito" de Barbate and Pepe el Malagueño. With the business she released Carmen at teatro Rialto, España baila flamenco at Teatro Muñoz Seca and Flamenco Feeling. El sentimiento at Teatro de las Esquinas.

== Partial filmography ==
- Gunfight at Red Sands (1963) as Elisa Martinez
- Los Tarantos (1963) as Juana
- El extraño viaje (1964) as Angelines
- Murieta (1965) as Rosita Murrieta
- Fall of the Mohicans (1965) as Cora Munro
- La busca (1966) as Justa
- El filo del miedo (1967) as Elena
- La familia Colón (1967, TV Series) as María
- Cuando los niños vienen de Marsella (1974) as María
- ¡Señoras y señores! (1974)
- Cuentos y leyendas (1974, TV Series)
- La Carmen (1976) as Carmen
- Impossible Love (1977) as Laura
- Uno del millón de muertos (1977)
- Curro Jiménez (1977, TV Series)
- Pecado mortal (1977) as Madeleine
- Avisa a Curro Jiménez (1978) as Araceli
- Donde hay patrón... (1978) as Andrea
- El violador y sus mujeres a la sombra de un recuerdo (1978) as Lola
- Historia de 'S' (1979) as Antonia
- El caminante (1979) as Doña Aurora
- La máscara negra (1982, TV Series) (final appearance)

== Bibliography ==
- Weisser, Thomas (22 August 2005). Spaghetti Westerns--the Good, the Bad and the Violent: A Comprehensive, Illustrated Filmography of 558 Eurowesterns and Their Personnel, 1961-1977. McFarland Publishing. p. 498. ISBN 9780786424429.
