= Rufino Inglés =

Spanish actor (1902–1981)

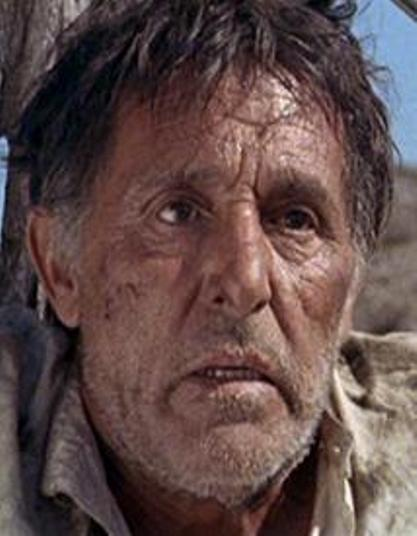
- Rufino Inglés in A Bullet for the General, 1966
- Born: Rufino Inglés García; 10 November 1902; Madrid
- Died: 2 November 1981 (aged 78); Madrid
- Occupation: Actor
- Children: Javier Inglés

Rufino Inglés (10 November 1902 – 2 November 1981) was a Spanish actor.

He appeared in La novia de Juan Lucero (1959), Salto a la gloria, and God Forgives... I Don't!. He also appeared in Balboa (1963), Goliath Against the Giants (1961), Tombs of the Blind Dead (1972), and Juicio final (1955).

== Selected filmography ==
- La virgen de cristal (1926)
- El tonto de Lagartera (1927)
- La calumnia (1928)
- El gordo de navidad (1929)
- El nocturno de Chopin (1932)
- Water in the Ground (1934) as Poli Vilaredo
- Paloma de mis amores (1936)
- Jai-Alai (1940)
- Oro vil (1941)
- ¡A mí la legión! (1942) as Capitán Romero
- El triunfo del amor (1943)
- Tarjeta de visita (1944) as Martín Fernández
- El pozo de los enamorados (1945)
- La tempestad (1945)
- Chantaje (1946)
- Alma canaria (1947)
- Héroes del 95 (1947) as Sargento
- El huésped del cuarto número 13 (1947)
- Dos mujeres y un rostro (1947)
- Aventuras de don Juan de Mairena (1948) as Fernando
- Guest of Darkness (1948)
- Las aguas bajan negras (1948) as Sargeant
- La calle sin sol (1948)
- Jalisco Sings in Seville (1949)
- Loyola, the Soldier Saint (1949)
- La manigua sin dios (1949)
- Siempre vuelven de madrugada (1949) as Paco
- ¡El santuario no se rinde! (1949) as Comandante rojo (uncredited)
- Adventures of Juan Lucas (1949) as Cojo
- Paz (1949)
- El duende y el rey (1950)
- La sombra iluminada (1950) as Inspector
- Murió hace quince años (1954) as Segundo agente en El Escorial (uncredited)
- La reina mora (1955) as Hombre en feria (uncredited)
- La otra vida del capitán Contreras (1955) as Hombre ballando en habitación
- Marcelino pan y vino (1955) as Council Member
- El indiano (1955)
- Coyote (1955)
- Death of a Cyclist (1955) as Nico
- El tren expreso (1955)
- Orgullo (1955)
- Suspenso en comunismo (1956) as Viajero del autobús
- Tarde de toros (1956) as Amigo 3º
- La gran mentira (1956) as Recepcionista
- La espera (1956)
- Curra Veleta (1956) as Recepcionista hotel
- La mestiza (1956)
- Pasión en el mar (1956) as patrón del San Juan
- Río Guadalquivir (1957)
- Susana y yo (1957)
- Maravilla (1957) as Escocés
- Tremolina (1957) as Oficial de aduanas
- El hombre que viajaba despacito (1957) as Jugador de cartas
- Un abrigo a cuadros (1957) as Ángel
- La hija de Juan Simón (1957) as Director sesión fotográfica
- Fulano y Mengano (1957)
- Aquellos tiempos del cuplé (1958)
- La violetera (1958)
- Héroes del aire (1958) as Comandante
- La venganza (1958) as Amo 1
- Caravana de esclavos (1958) as Abu el Mot's Man in Charge (uncredited)
- Secretaria para todo (1958)
- Habanera (1958)
- Canto para ti (1959) as Presidente de la fiesta
- Honeymoon (1959) as Customs Agent
- La novia de Juan Lucero (1959)
- Salto a la gloria (1959)
- Venta de Vargas (1959)
- Sonatas (1959) as Doctor
- Una gran señora (1959) as Tipo del bar
- La vida alrededor (1959) as Policía que detiene a Ceferino
- S.O.S., abuelita (1959)
- Un hecho violento (1959) as Preso (uncredited)
- Tenemos 18 años (1959) as Jefe indio
- Juicio final (1960)
- El amor que yo te di (1960)
- El Litri y su sombra (1960) as Amigo del viejo Litri (uncredited)
- El hombre que perdió el tren (1960)
- Crimen para recién casados (1960) as Padre de Elisa
- Ama Rosa (1960)
- La rana verde (1960) as Conde de la Mota
- Compadece al delincuente (1960)
- Culpables (1960) as Amigo #2
- El hombre de la isla (1960) as Médico
- Mi último tango (1960)
- Ursus (1961)
- Adiós, Mimí Pompón (1961)
- Goliath Against the Giants (1961)
- El secreto de los hombres azules (1961)
- Fantasmas en la casa (1961) as Recepcionista
- Margarita se llama mi amor (1961)
- Los dos golfillos (1961)
- Tres de la Cruz Roja (1961)
- Rosa de Lima (1961)
- Kilómetro 12 (1961)
- Salto mortal (1962)
- La mentira tiene cabellos rojos (1962) as Fraile
- Abuelita Charlestón (1962)
- Teresa de Jesús (1962)
- Historia de una noche (1962) as Maître
- Accidente 703 (1962)
- Mentirosa (1962)
- Escuela de seductoras (1962)
- I tromboni di Fra Diavolo (1962)
- Vuelve San Valentín (1962)
- Cupido contrabandista (1962) as Instructor de motos
- Atraco a las tres (1962)
- La gran familia (1962)
- Shades of Zorro (1962) as Cochero
- Perseus Against the Monsters (1963) (uncredited)
- Plaza de oriente (1963)
- The Castilian (1963)
- Implacable Three (1963) as Sanders
- La pandilla de los once (1963)
- Gunfight at Red Sands (1963) as Poker Player
- Ensayo general para la muerte (1963)
- Objetivo: las estrellas (1963)
- Eva 63 (1963) as Amigo de Miguel
- La chica del gato (1964) as Jefe de estación
- The Spy (1964)
- El escándalo (1964)
- Three Ruthless Ones (1964) as Membro del jurado
- Tengo 17 años (1964) as Don Jorge inspector jefe (uncredited)
- Apache Fury (1964) as Banquero
- Black Angel of the Mississippi (1964) as Banquero
- Fin de semana (1964)
- Doomed Fort (1964) as Juez militar
- El salario del crimen (1964)
- Rueda de sospechosos (1964) as José
- Cavalry Charge (1964)
- Miguelín (1965)
- Murieta (1965) (uncredited)
- Seven Hours of Gunfire (1965) as Padre de Bill
- Shoot to Kill (1965) as Davy, Bartender
- Whisky y vodka (1965)
- Espionage in Tangiers (1965) as Hotel Clerk
- Fall of the Mohicans (1965) as Doctor
- Hands of a Gunfighter (1965) as Tendero
- Misión especial en Caracas (1965)
- Mi canción es para ti (1965)
- In a Colt's Shadow (1965) as Gambler (uncredited)
- Operation Poker (1965) as British Intelligence Chief (uncredited)
- La escalada de la muerte (1965) as Hombre de la maleta
- Las últimas horas... (1966)
- With the East Wind (1966) as Eduardo
- Operación Lady Chaplin (1966) as Doctor (uncredited)
- Huida en la frontera (1966) as Police chief
- Django Does Not Forgive (1966)
- A Bullet for the General (1967) as Capt. Enrique Sanchez Compoy (uncredited)
- Dinamita Joe (1967) as Soldier (uncredited)
- Ultimate Gunfighter (1967) as Senor Pedro Campos
- Dos alas (1967)
- I'll Kill Him and Return Alone (1967) as Ciudadano (uncredited)
- Las cicatrices (1967)
- Club de solteros (1967)
- If One Is Born a Swine (1967)
- God Forgives... I Don't! (1967) as Old Mexican in Taverna
- Camino de la verdad (1968)
- Go for Broke (1968) as Jack, Townsman (uncredited)
- White Comanche (1968) as Barman (uncredited)
- One by One (1968) as Sheriff in First Scene (uncredited)
- Crime Story (1968) as The General
- Camino de la verdad (1968)
- La batalla del último Panzer (1969)
- Death on High Mountain (1969)
- Adiós cordera (1969)
- Siete minutos para morir (1969) as Dueño albergue
- The Avenger, Zorro (1969) as Banker (uncredited)
- El apartamento de la tentación (1971)
- Dead Men Ride (1971) as Sheriff (uncredited)
- El bandido Malpelo (1971)
- La montaña rebelde (1971)
- Alta tensión (1972)
- Tombs of the Blind Dead (1972) as Inspector Oliveira
- Prey of Vultures (1972) as Townsman (uncredited)
- Secuestro a la española (1972)
- Im Auftrag von Madame (1973, TV Series) as Fellini
- La descarriada (1973)
- Los gozos y las sombras (1982, TV Series) as El Juez (final appearance)

== Bibliography ==
- Kinnard, Roy; Crnkovich, Tony (28 February 2017). Italian Sword and Sandal Films, 1908-1990. McFarland Publishing. p. 256. ISBN 9781476627045.
