= Antoñita Singla =

Spanish-born Romani flamenco dancer and actress

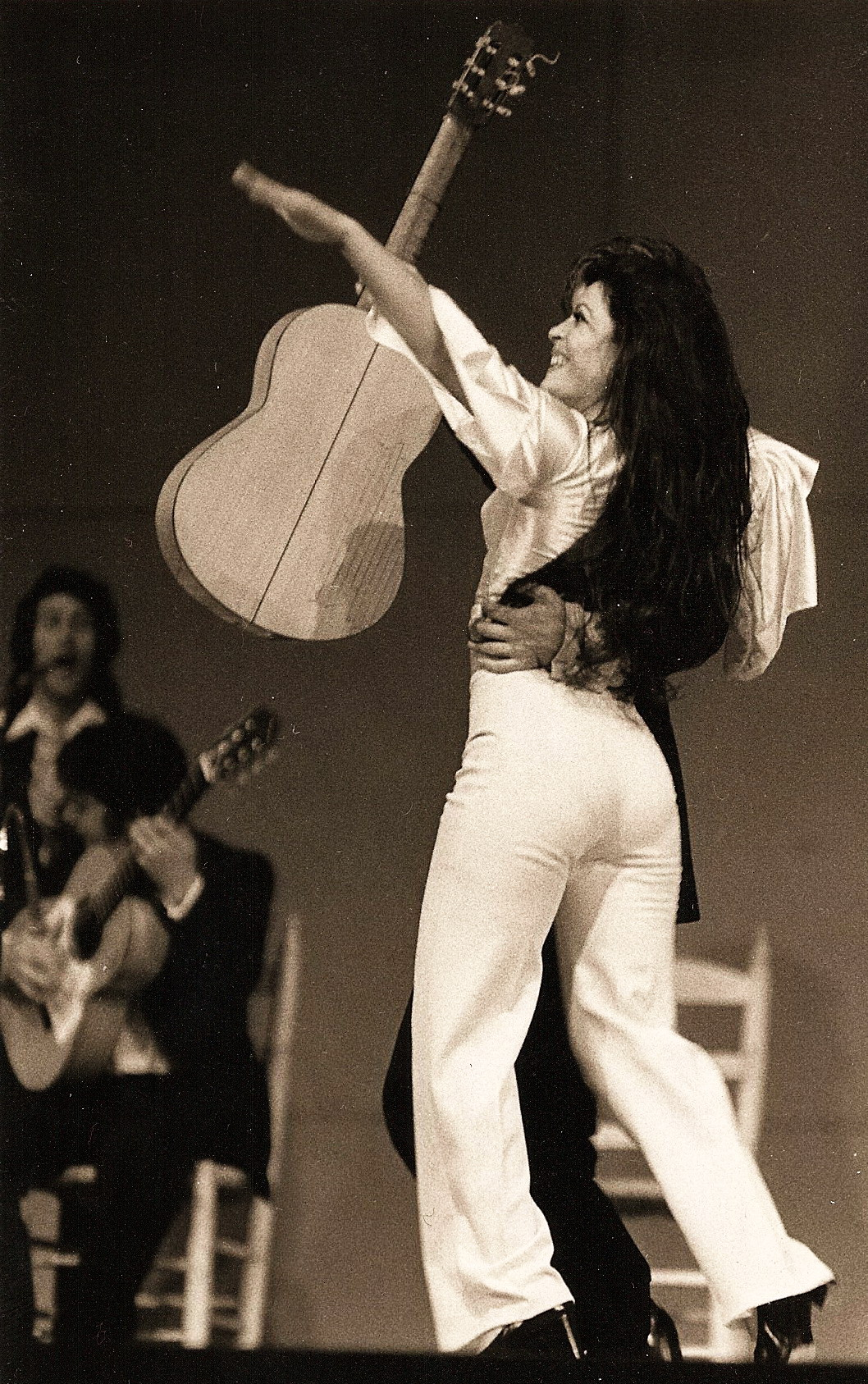
- Born: Antonia Singla-Contreras; 1948 (age 77–78); Barcelona, Spain
- Other names: La Singla, Antonia Singla, Antoñita la Singla
- Years active: 1960–1988
- Known for: Flamenco dancer
- Notable work: Los Tarantos

Antonia Singla Contreras (born 1948), more commonly known by her stage name(s) La Singla, or Antoñita Singla, is a Catalan-born Romani flamenco dancer and actress.

== Early life ==
Antonia Singla Contreras was born in 1948 in the neighborhood Somorrostro de la Barceloneta, in Barcelona, Spain. At the time of her birth, this neighborhood was a shanty town and a Romani community. A few days after her birth she was in pain, perhaps caused by meningitis, and lost her hearing. In 1968, she made a partial recovery from her medical condition. While she was growing up, La Singla learned to dance rumba, fandango, bulerías and flamenco with considerable skill. Singla began to dance by watching her mother clapping, absorbing the rhythm and turning it into a really remarkable dance full of emotions. It is said that she did not speak fluently until the age of 16.

== Career ==
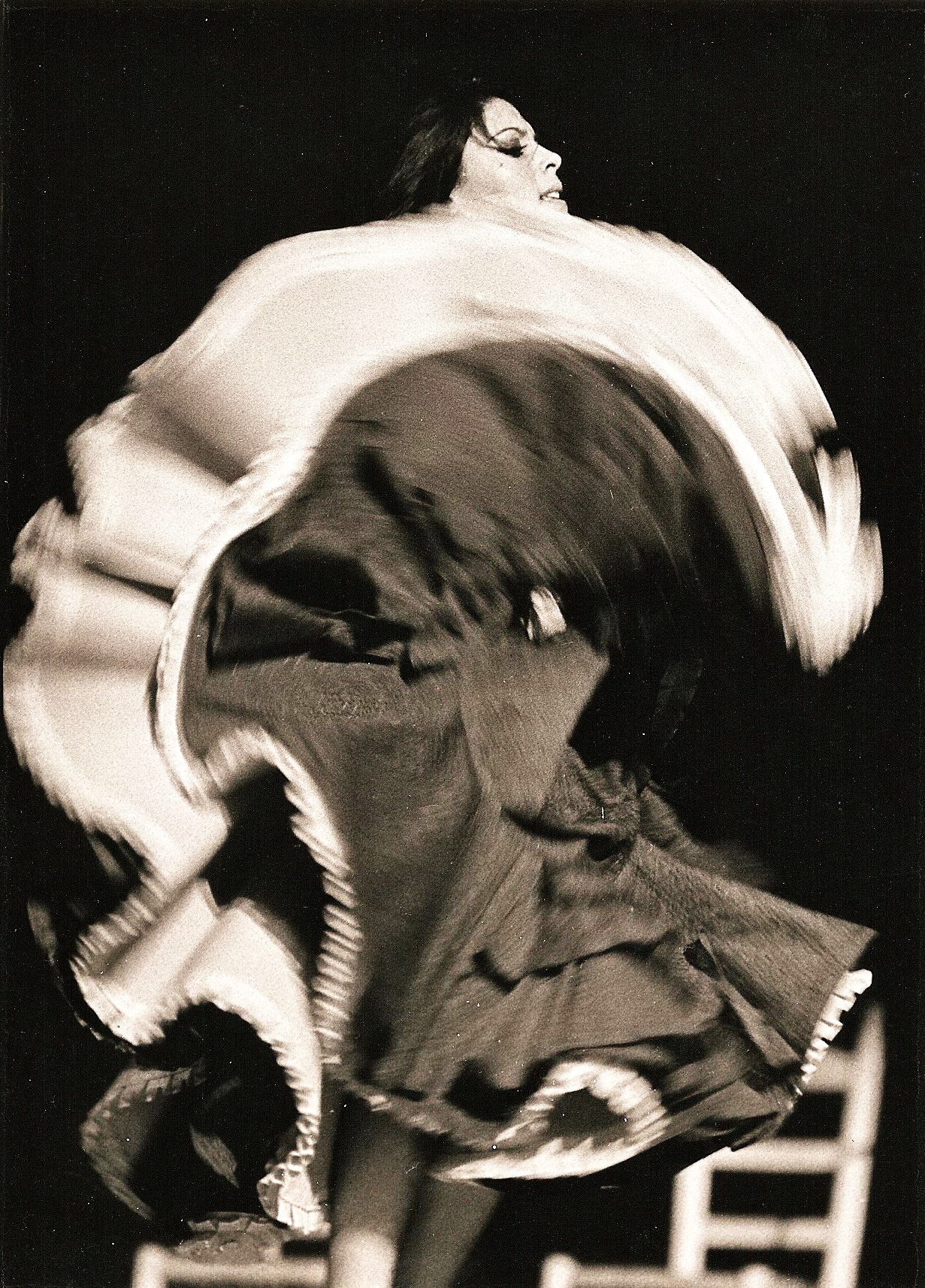
La Singla dancing

Singla began her career at the early age of 12, dancing in some taverns in Barcelona. She was known for wearing pants in a bailaor style when performing dramatic dancing, something also done by Carmen Amaya and a few other flamenco dancers before her.

In 1960, she launched her artistic career by participating in the group project Festival Flamenco Gitano in which personalities such as Paco de Lucía, Camarón de la Isla, and El Faraón, among others, participated. This 1965 event was the brainchild of German organizers of Blues and Gospel festivals, who decided to invest in flamenco, later participating in numerous television programs. In addition, the Festival Flamenco Gitano toured Europe and the American continent. The first performance took place in the German capital, Berlin. La Singla was more famous internationally than in Spain.

In 1963, she performed as an actress and dancer in the film Los Tarantos, directed by Francisco Rovira-Beleta. The film is based on a play by Alfredo Mañas and tells the story of the fierce confrontation between two Roma families in Barcelona: "Los Tarantos" and "Los Zorongos". Antoñita La Singla participated in the film as 'Sole', one of the dancers. In addition, thanks to the filming of the movie, Singla was able to meet Carmen Amaya, to whom she was compared. The film, Los Tarantos was nominated for an Academy Award in 1964 for "Best Foreign Language Film".

Another important milestone in the career of Antoñita Singla was her performance in the flamenco club Los Califas, a 1964 flamenco club whose tablao flamenco was inaugurated on October 15, 1965. The club owners heard about her through the artistic manager Antonio Fernández. A few days later she traveled to Madrid ready to debut in "Los Califas". It was not easy to accompany "La Singla", since she lacked the hearing and speech needed to interact with the musicians. Nevertheless, she flawlessly executed the performance in its entirety. It was this unusual situation that drew professionals from the flamenco dance community to the Los Califas dance club.

== Legacy ==
As of 2017, Singla lives in Santa Coloma de Gramenet, in Catalonia, Spain far from the tablaos.

On April 15, 2017, one of the brothers of the artist, Juan José Singla Contreras, and his partner, Santiago Parra, opened a flamenco tablao in Barcelona with the name of La Singla to pay tribute. The location of La Singla is located in front of La Monumental bullring, and it is the first new flamenco establishment that has opened in the city in 30 years.

In 2023 a documentary film La Singla was released, which was about Singla's life, career, and contained interview to her.
