= Somorrostro =

Beach in Barcelona, Catalonia, Spain

Coordinates: 41.38392°N 2.19622°E

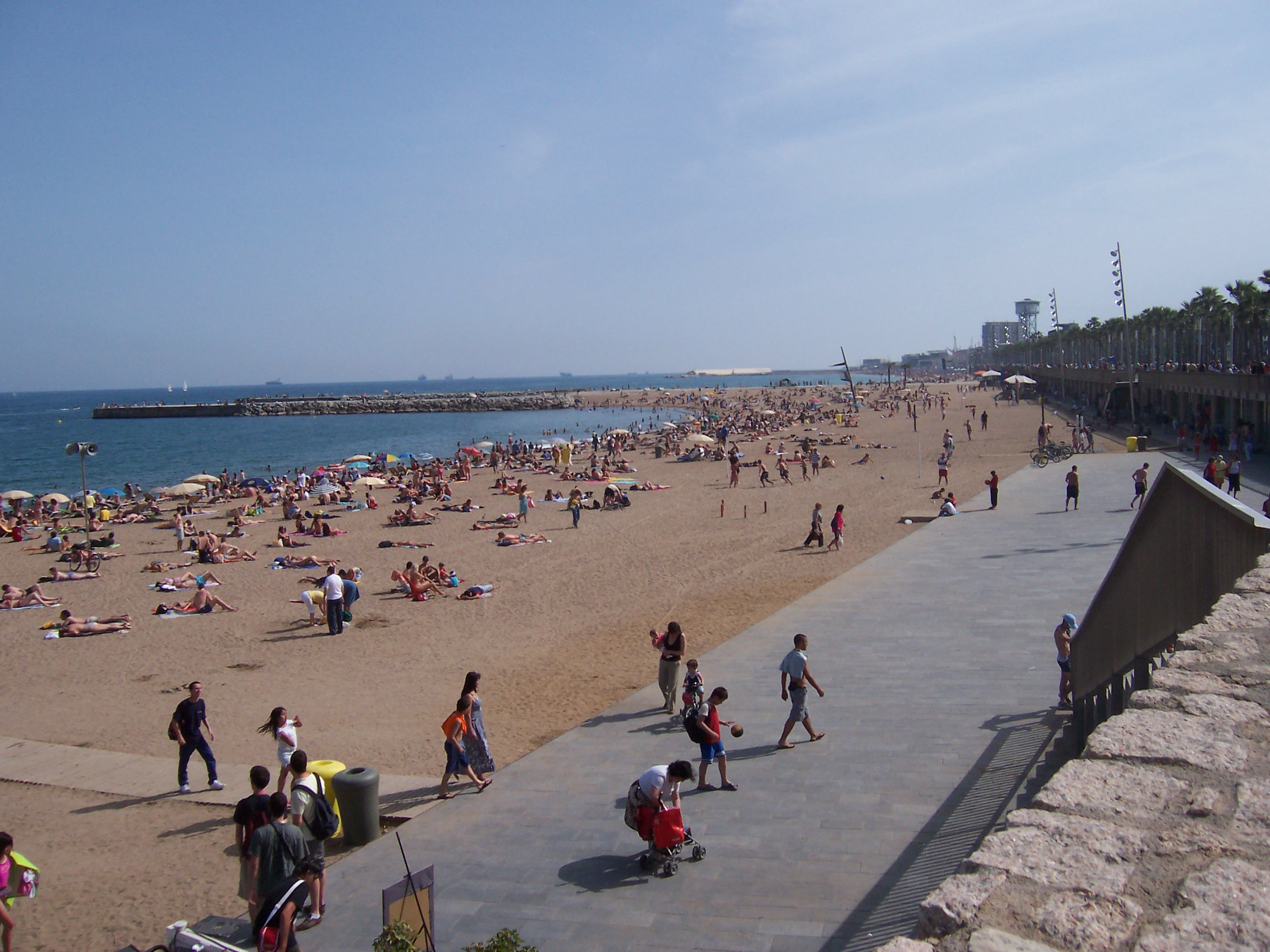
Somorrostro beach

Somorrostro Beach is a beach in Barcelona, Catalonia, Spain. It is located between the Hospital del Mar and Marina Street, in the far east area of the Barceloneta neighborhood, in the Ciutat Vella district. It is 522 metres (1,713 ft) long and 89 metres (292 ft) wide. The Somorrostro name was forgotten and the beach became one of the most popular in the city. It was not until 2010, Somorrostro beach got its original name back.

== History ==
During the 19th century and part of the 20th century, the beach, and much of the neighboring beach areas were occupied by a shanty town, inhabited by 15,000 people living in over 2,000 slums. It was known during this time as a Romani community. It was not until the 1966 visit of Spanish caudillo Francisco Franco that the slum removal began. Most of the slums in Somorrostro were demolished between the 1960s and 1980s.

Famous Roma flamenco dancers Carmen Amaya and La Singla were born in the neighborhood. In addition, Los Tarantos, an academy award-nominated film about flamenco starring Amaya, and featuring Singla, was filmed in Somorrostro in 1963.

== Gallery ==
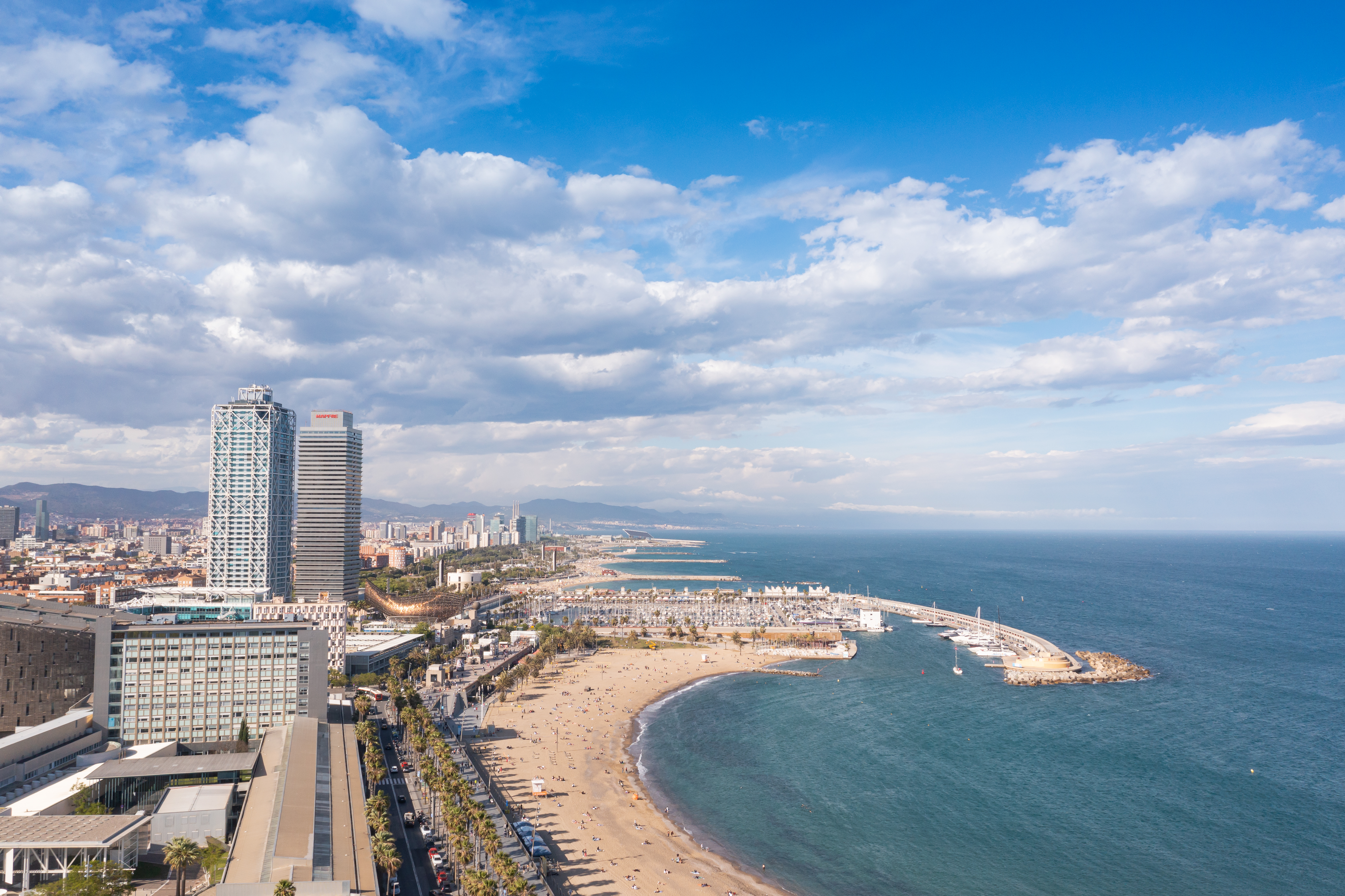
Aerial view of Somorrostro Beach and Port Olympic in Barcelona, Spain

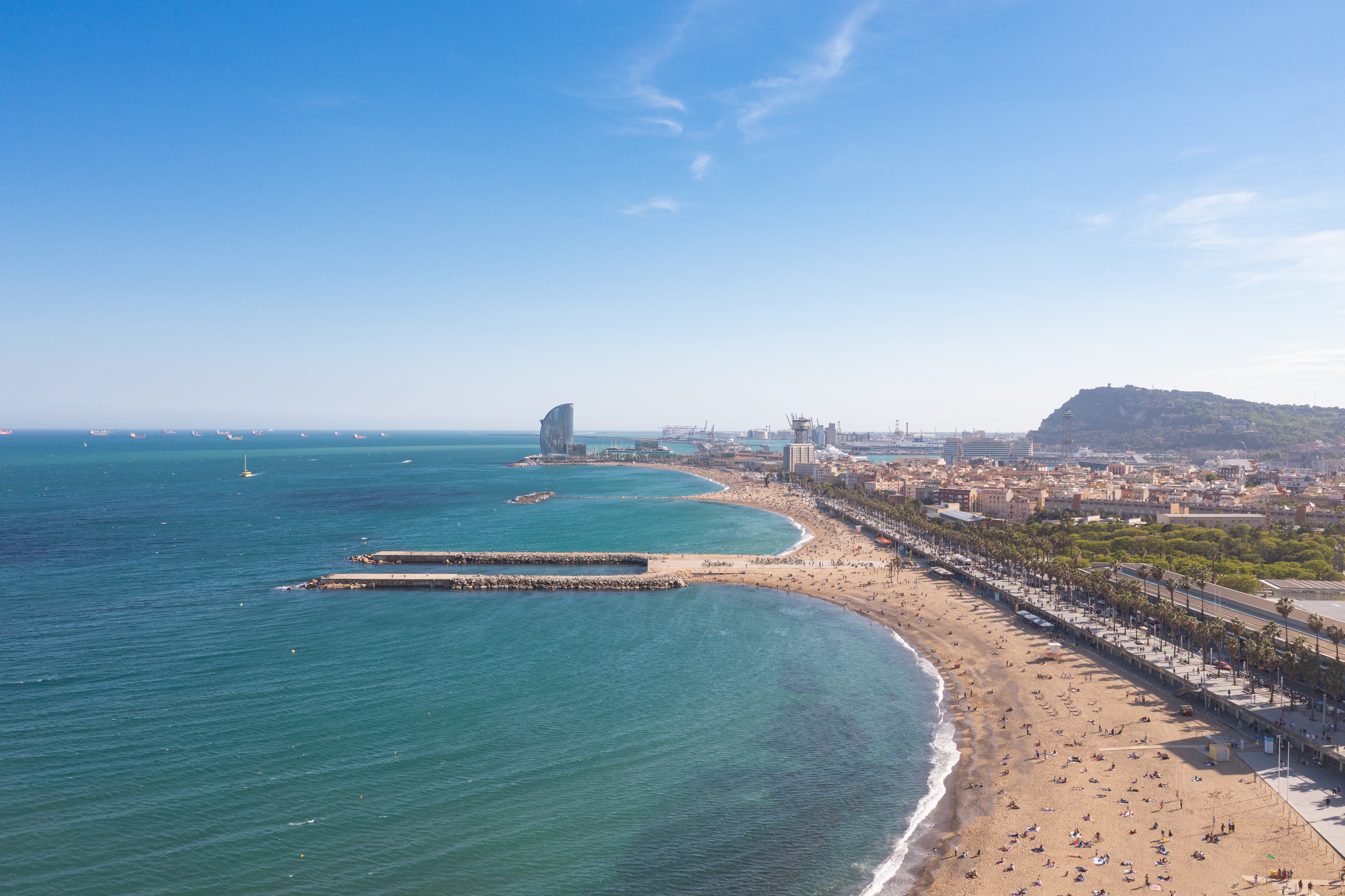
Aerial view of the Promenade and Somorrostro Beach in Barcelona

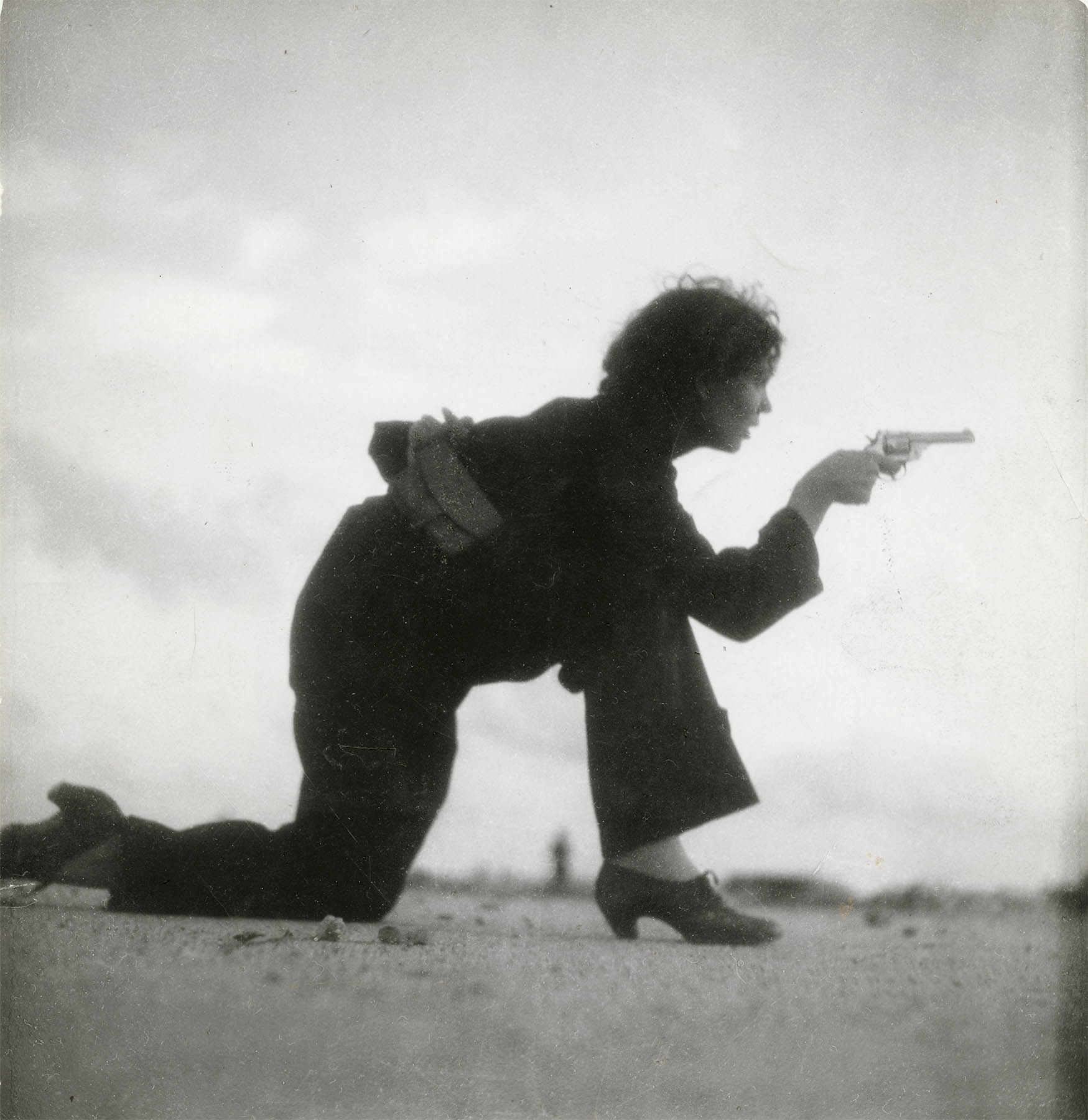
Woman training for a Republican militia by Gerda Taro, Somorrostro Beach, La Barceloneta (1936).
