= Daniel Martín (actor) =

Spanish actor (1935–2009)

- Born: José Martínez Martínez; 12 May 1935; Cartagena, Murcia, Second Spanish Republic
- Died: 28 September 2009 (aged 74); Nuévalos, Zaragoza, Spain
- Occupation: Actor

Daniel Martín (12 May 1935 – 28 September 2009) was a Spanish actor.

Martín was known for his role as Rafael in the film Los Tarantos (1963), directed by Francisco Rovira Beleta and starring Antonio Gades and Carmen Amaya. It was nominated for an Academy Award for Best Foreign Language Film at 36th edition. He played Condor in the Spaghetti western film Blood River (1974), starring Fabio Testi, John Ireland and Rosalba Neri, and Julián in A Fistful of Dollars (1964).

Martín died from pancreatic cancer in Nuévalos, Zaragoza, on 28 September 2009, at the age of 74.

== Filmography ==
=== Films ===
- Los cuervos (1961) as Candidato del Dr. Kranich
- Las hijas del Cid (1962)
- Los guerrilleros (1963) (uncredited)
- Gunfight at Red Sands (1963) as Manuel Martinez (as Dan Martin)
- Los Tarantos (1963) as Rafael
- Los felices sesenta (1963)
- A Fistful of Dollars (1964) as Julián (as Daniel Martin)
- Man Called Gringo (1965) as Gringo (as Dan Martin)
- The Last Tomahawk (1965) as Unkas (as Dan Martin)
- Fall of the Mohicans (1965) as Uncas
- La dama del alba (1966) as Martín
- Seven Magnificent Guns (1966) as Slim
- La busca (1966) as Vidal
- The Last Meeting (1967) as Juan
- Mission Stardust (1967) as Captain Flipper
- Las 4 bodas de Marisol (1967) as Doctor Pierre Durán
- De cuerpo presente (1967) as Rod, el cowboy
- La cabeza del Bautista (1967, Short)
- Cada vez que... (1968) as Mark
- Un minuto para rezar, un segundo para morir (1968) as Father Santana (uncredited)
- They Came to Rob Las Vegas (1968) as Merino
- La banda de los tres crisantemos (1970) as Frank Olinger (as Danny Martin)
- Golpe de mano (1970) as Capitán Andújar
- Black Beauty (1971) as Lieutenant (as Daniel Martin)
- Dead Men Ride (1971) as Miner (as Daniel Martin)
- Let's Go and Kill Sartana (1971)
- Bad Man's River (1971) as False Montero
- Laia (1972) as Esteva (as Daniel Martin)
- Watch Out Gringo! Sabata Will Return (1972) as Luke Morton / Luck Morgan
- They Believed He Was No Saint (1972) as Paco
- Robinson and His Tempestuous Slaves (1972) as Lindas Komplize beim scheiternden Juwelenraub (uncredited)
- A Noose Is Waiting for You Trinity (1972) as Slim
- Crypt of the Living Dead (1973) as Gero
- La policía detiene, la ley juzga (1973) as Rico
- White Fang (1973) as Charlie
- Los fríos senderos del crimen (1974) as Fred Connor
- Blood River (1974) as Condor
- Demon Witch Child (1975) as William Grant
- Valley of the Dancing Widows (1975) as Juan Hernandez
- Cry, Onion! (1975) as Jim (uncredited)
- My Husband Prefers Virgins (1975) as Comisario
- Los casados y la menor (1975) as Moisés
- Guerreras verdes (1976) as Primo
- Devil's Kiss (1976) as Richard
- El puente (1977) as Pijo en el viñedo
- Forbidden Love (1977) as Pedro
- Wifemistress (1977) as Carlos Valle (as Daniel Martin)
- Makarras Conexion (1977) as Jefe de la banda
- Jill (1978) as Arturo de Sousa
- Espectro (Más allá del fin del mundo) (1978) as Profesor Daniel del Valle
- La ciudad maldita (1978) as Max Thaler
- Inés de Villalonga 1870 (1979) as Teniente carlista
- Mystery on Monster Island (1981)
- Vivir mañana (1983) as Juan
- Siesta (1987) as Beaten Spaniard (as Daniel Martin)
- El Lute II: Tomorrow I'll Be Free (1988) as Vendedor inmobiliario (uncredited)
- Malaventura (1988) as Paco
- Al Andalus, el camino del sol (1989)
- Blood and Sand (1989) as Diego Fuentes (as Daniel Martin)
- Love, Hate and Death (1989) as Goyo Picao
- El equipo Aahhgg (1989) as Capataz
- A tiro limpio (1996) as Felipe
- Brazen Hussies (1996, TV Movie) as Terry
- Dollar for the Dead (1998, TV Movie) as Gambler - Sterling

=== Television ===
- La familia Colón (1967) as Luis Miguel / Curro
- Percy Stuart (1969)
- Sospecha (1970)
- Novela (1971)
- Cuentos y leyendas (1974)
- Los libros (1976) as Mauricio
- Curro Jiménez (1977) as Andrés
- Cervantes (1981)
- Las pícaras (1983)
- Los desastres de la guerra (1983)
- La huella del crimen (1985) as Policía 1º
- Página de sucesos (1985)
- Pepe Carvalho (1986) as Policía
- Turno de oficio (1986) as Cirujano
- El gran secreto (1989)
- Brigada central (1989) as Policía
- Blue Blood (1990) as Luis
- Réquiem por Granada (1991) as Fernandarias
- Don Quijote de la Mancha (1991)
- Canguros (1995)
- Médico de familia (1996) as Jacinto
- Éste es mi barrio (1996-1997)
- La vida en el aire (1998) as Jiménez
- Antivicio (2000)
- Hospital Central (2002) as Anciano Manuel / Hombre (final appearance)
