= Blue Eyes of the Broken Doll =

1974 Spanish horror-giallo film

- Theatrical release poster
- Spanish: Los ojos azules de la muñeca rota
- Directed by: Carlos Aured
- Written by: Jacinto Molina
- Produced by: José Antonio Pérez Giner
- Starring: Paul Naschy; Diana Lorys; Maria Perschy; Eva Leon; Eduardo Calvo
- Cinematography: Francisco Sanchez
- Edited by: Javier Moran
- Music by: Juan Carlos Calderón
- Distributed by: Profilmes
- Release date: August 1974
- Running time: 89 minutes
- Country: Spain
- Language: Spanish

Blue Eyes of the Broken Doll (Spanish: Los ojos azules de la muñeca rota) is a 1973 Spanish horror-giallo film directed by Carlos Aured and starring Paul Naschy (who also wrote the film), Diana Lorys, Maria Perschy, and Eva Leon. The film was shown theatrically in Spain in August 1974 as Los Ojos Azules de la Muñeca Rota. It was released theatrically in the U.S. and on VHS Home Video as The House Of Psychotic Women (slightly edited), and was shown on U.S. late-night television as House of Doom (in an even more edited version). The film was shown in Belgium as Mystery of the Blue Eyes. Most prints are missing a brief scene where a pig is slaughtered on a farm. Today the film is readily available complete and unedited on DVD and Blu-ray as The Blue Eyes of the Broken Doll.

While not prosecuted for obscenity, the film was seized and confiscated in raids in the UK under Section 3 of the Obscene Publications Act 1959 during the video nasty panic, probably due to the lurid video box art. Strangely, although this was Naschy's take on the Italian giallo genre, the film does not appear to have been theatrically distributed at all in Italy, France or Germany.

== Plot ==
The story concerns a drifter named Gilles (Naschy) who arrives in a French village looking for work. He soon gets a lift from a woman named Claude (Lorys) who sports a prosthetic hand, hiding a gruesome deformity. She gives him a job as a handyman at a large house owned by her and her two sisters: nymphomaniac redhead Nicole (Leon) and wheelchair-using Yvette (Perschy). Soon after he sets up doing chores around the grounds, Nicole takes a strong interest in him and Claude voices her disgust, while Yvette is tended to by a doctor and nurse. As these domestic events occur, a black-gloved killer is murdering blue-eyed women and gouging out their eyes, saving them in a jar of water. Before too long Gilles is painted as a top suspect, due to a shady past involving his abuse of a former girlfriend, and a posse pursues him into the surrounding forest. The men kill Gilles, but the serial killings continue. In the end, it is revealed that a doctor who lost his little daughter to botched medical care in a hospital has kept her corpse in a hidden sanctuary and has been killing blue-eyed women so that he can obtain new eyes for the badly decaying corpse.

== Cast ==
- Paul Naschy as Gilles
- Diana Lorys as Claude
- Maria Perschy as Ivette Rollet
- Eduardo Calvo as Dr. Phillipe
- Eva León as Nicole Rollet
- Inés Morales as Michelle Botte
- Antonio Pica as Inspector Pierre
- Luis Ciges as René
- Pilar Bardem as Caroline

== Background ==
- Paul Naschy was also known as Jacinto Molina, and starred as a werewolf in 12 different films in his native Spain. He and director Aured collaborated on a number of such horror films.
- A theater marquee displays House of Psychotic Women in the 1980 film Times Square.

== Release ==
The film was released theatrically in its native Spain in August 1974 as Los Ojos Azules de la Muñeca Rota. The film was released theatrically in the United States by Independent-International Pictures in April 1976 as House of Psychotic Women.

The film contains graphic scenes of gore and nudity, and was rated R in the U.S. under its slightly edited version titled House of Psychotic Women. House of Doom was the even more heavily edited version that was released direct to U.S. TV.

The film was released complete and unedited on a special edition DVD in 2007 by Deimos Entertainment, a subdivision of BCI Eclipse, as Blue Eyes of the Broken Doll with added audio commentaries. It was also released on Blu-ray by Shout Factory as part of their Paul Naschy Collection.

== Soundtrack ==
The tune "Frère Jacques" is occasionally played on the soundtrack, albeit slightly jazzed up with bass, drums and violin, during the murder scenes.
