= La Barceloneta, Barcelona =

La Barceloneta
- Neighborhood
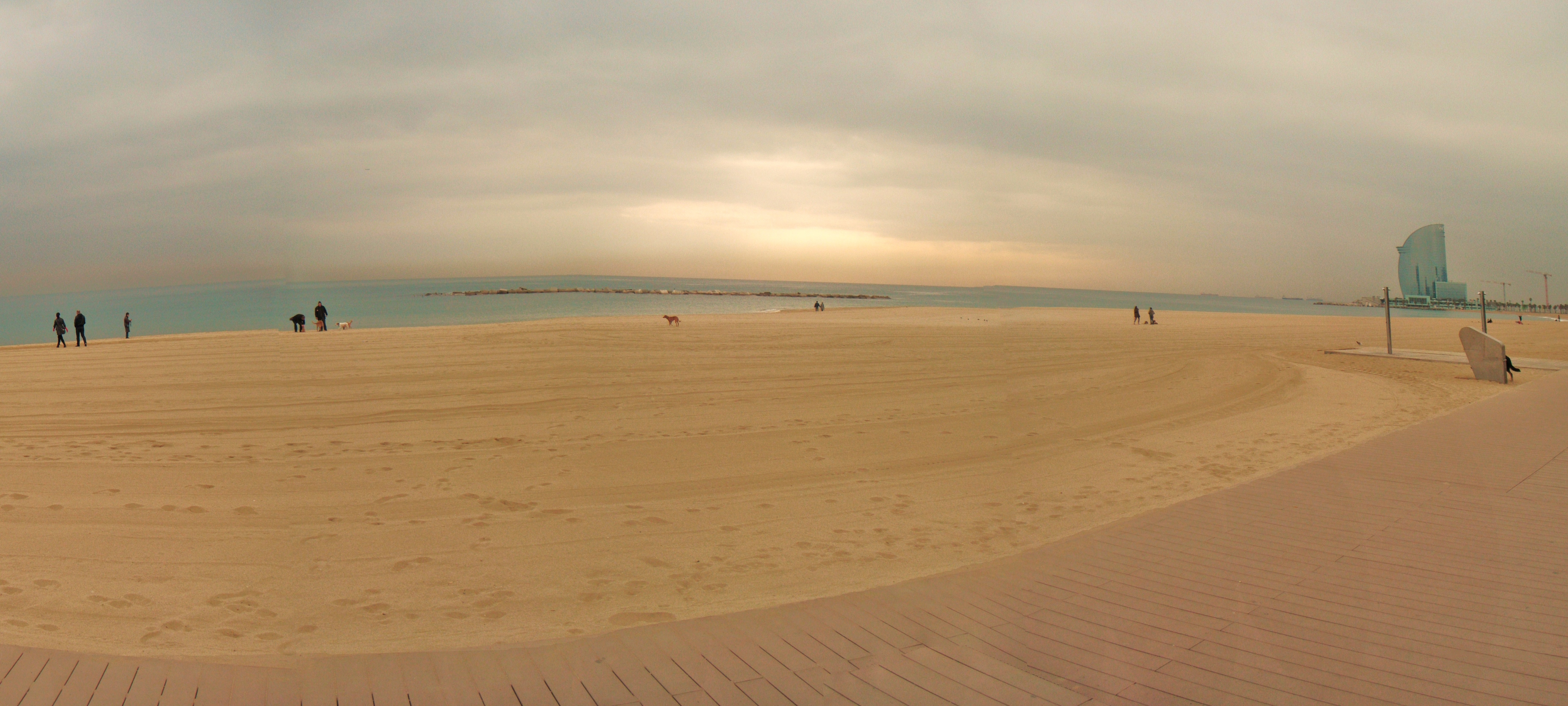
- Barceloneta beach in winter, with W Barcelona Hotel

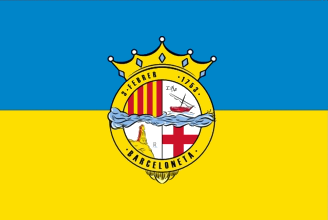
- Flag

- Map of la Barceloneta within the Ciutat Vella district
- Country: Spain
- Autonomous Community: Catalonia
- Province: Barcelona
- Comarca: Barcelonès
- Municipality: Barcelona
- District: Ciutat Vella

Population (2023)
  - Total: 14,274
- Postal code: 08003
- Website: ajuntament.barcelona.cat

La Barceloneta (Catalan pronunciation: [lə βəɾsəluˈnɛtə], Spanish pronunciation: [la βaɾθeloˈneta]) is a neighborhood in the Ciutat Vella district of Barcelona, Catalonia, Spain. The neighborhood was built in the 18th century for the residents of the Ribera neighborhood who had been displaced by the construction of the Ciutadella of Barcelona. The neighborhood has a triangular shape, bordered by the Mediterranean Sea, the Moll d’Espanya of Port Vell, and the El Born neighborhood. This neighborhood has its own flag and metro stop on the Barcelona Metro line 4. The neighborhood can also be explored by taking Las Gorondrinas, which depart from the front port of the Columbus monument. This way, one can see the coastal strip, but the real charm of this neighborhood lies in wandering through its narrow streets and alleys. Torre Sant Sebastià is the terminus of the Port Vell Aerial Tramway; opened in 1931, it connects La Barceloneta with Montjuïc across Port Vell.

La Barceloneta is known for its sandy beaches (which appeared in Don Quixote, book 2) and its many restaurants and nightclubs along the boardwalk. Over the past several years, the quality of the sand on the beach has been a source of ongoing controversy. In February 2008, the World Health Organization started an inquiry to determine whether the sand meets WHO beach health and safety guidelines.

With its modernity, La Barceloneta still retains the scent of salt and marine life. For many, this is considered a luxury. La Barceloneta also attracts many cruise ships to dock.

Among the attractions on Barceloneta’s beach are German artist Rebecca Horn's "Homenatge a la Barceloneta" monument, and, where the beach meets the Port Olímpic, Frank Gehry's contemporary "Peix d’Or" sculpture.

In the center of the neighborhood, there is a small museum called "Casa de la Barceloneta", housed in a preserved building dating back to 1761. Admission to the museum provides an insight into the evolution of the neighborhood and its history. The house has a stone façade with letters and numbers engraved on it, indicating the plots used in construction.

== History ==
La Barceloneta was mostly underwater until the 1600s. During the construction of Port Vell, a dike was built to connect the small island of Maians to the city, and landfill created the land on which the neighborhood was later built.

La Barceloneta was virtually uninhabited until the mid 18th century. Fishermen were the first to visit this part of Barcelona despite the risky sea conditions. In 1754, construction of the first houses began, and the neighborhood started to fill with residents who participated in activities of the port.

The neighborhood of La Barceloneta was designed by an engineer named Juan Martín Cermeño. The famous markets in La Barceloneta were designed by the Catalan architect Antoni Rovira i Trias in 1873. He had an urban plan for the future of Barcelona architecture, which won the 1859 municipal contest by city council's decree. However, the central government in Madrid preferred the plan of Ildefons Cerdà. Rovira and his work were soon forgotten and lost in history until a book was published about his style of urban planning and the other works he was in charge of, such as the numerous markets in La Barceloneta.

In the present day, in the building of Palau de Mar on the Passeig de Joan de Borbó, there is the History Museum of Catalonia. This museum has a permanent exhibit about the history of Catalonia from its industrialization, through the era of dictatorship, to the present day democracy. Additionally, the terrace of their cafeteria offers a great view of the neighborhood and the port.

This neighborhood is not lacking in ancient history with its churches, such as the Sant Miquel del Port located in the Plaça de la Barceloneta.

The clock tower was built in 1772 within the Fishermen's Wharf and served as the lighthouse port until the mid 19th century. When the port was modernized, the use of the lighthouse became obsolete. To preserve its base, the tower was converted into a clock in the mid 19th century. This clock tower was one of the materials used by scientist Pierre Méchain as he measured the length of the meridian arc between Barcelona and Dunkirk in 1791, which led to the creation of the decimal metric system.

La Llotja, another building in La Barceloneta neighborhood, is a neoclassical building with a Gothic interior built in the 14th century. Inside the two-story building are examples of medieval works and neoclassical sculptures. In 1775, la Llotja became affiliated with the Real Academia, a school related to the industrial arts and other visual arts. At that time, the school was called la Escuela Gratuita de Diseño and was located on the top floor of la Llotja. It was not until 1928 that it changed its name to Real Academia de Bellas Artes de San Jorge, and in 1989 adopted its name in Catalan: Reial Acadèmia Catalana de Belles Arts de Sant Jordi (English: Royal Catalan Academy of Fine Arts of Saint George).

The Carmen Amaya Fountain is another historical landmark in La Barceloneta, built in 1959. It is located where Carrer Sant Carles meets the beach. It was made as a tribute to the most famous flamenco dancer in history, Carmen Amaya, who was born in a Gypsy settlement in La Barceloneta in 1913. The fountain depicts two guitarists and three flamenco dancers in the nude. It reflects the difficult past that La Barceloneta faced when it was inhabited by Gypsies, fishermen, and shacks. In the 1970s, the shacks were removed, but the memories remained. It was almost forgotten after the 1992 Summer Olympics in Barcelona.

== Present day ==
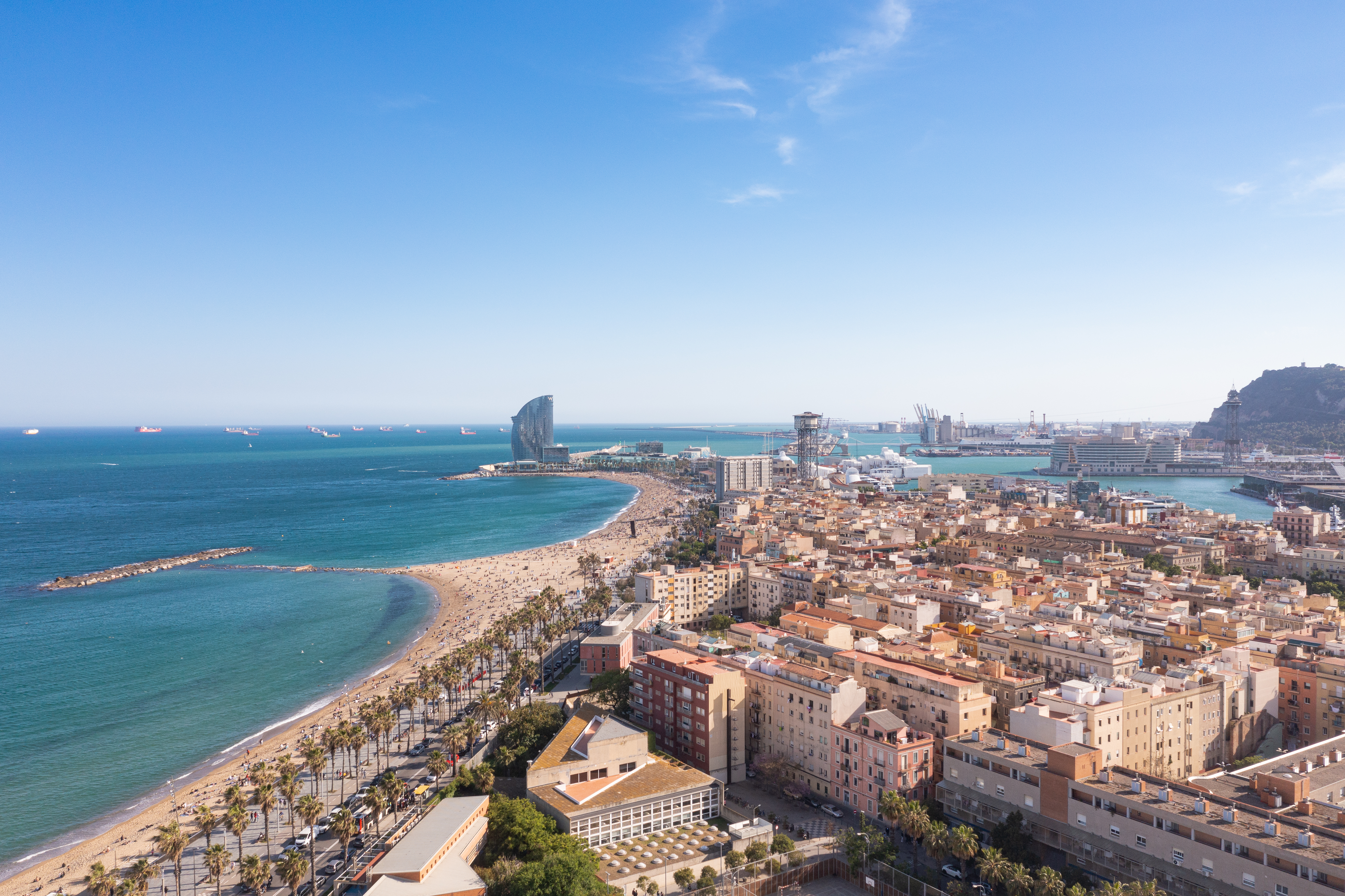
Aerial view of La Barceloneta and the beaches in Barcelona, Spain

In the present day, the neighborhood of La Barceloneta is still seen as foreign to the city where it is located. However, the environment has changed significantly, especially in the summer, when the beach is most popular. From dawn to dusk, the beach of La Barceloneta is the liveliest of all of Barcelona. La Barceloneta has many small bars or clubs where one can have dinner or a drink until late at night. When arriving at the beach, the environment and atmosphere of La Barceloneta change. Today, the cosmopolitan neighborhood reaches its peak of entertainment in the summer.

La Barceloneta is regarded as one of the best places to try fresh fish or paella in Barcelona. A variety of tapas are also available on any menu. The most typical tapa of La Barceloneta is called the "bomba". It is a ball of potatoes stuffed with meat and a choice of spicy sauce or the classic aioli. A "caña", a glass of beer from a keg, is always served as well. Near the beach, one might see balconies with clothes hanging to dry, various shops, wineries, bars, and restaurants.

La Barceloneta also houses a large Aquarium. The space consists of 20 large tanks and a transparent tunnel through which one can walk among sharks.

== See also ==
- Barceloneta (Barcelona Metro)
- Street names in Barcelona
- Urban planning of Barcelona
- Somorrostro
- Woman training for a Republican militia by Gerda Taro
