= Dead Men Ride =

1971 film

- Directed by: Aldo Florio
- Cinematography: Emilio Foriscot
- Music by: Bruno Nicolai
- Release date: 1971
- Language: Italian

Dead Men Ride (Italian: Anda muchacho, spara!, Spanish: El sol bajo la tierra) is a 1971 Italian-Spanish spaghetti Western film directed by Aldo Florio.

== Cast ==
- Fabio Testi as Roy Greenford
- Eduardo Fajardo as Redfield
- Ben Carrà as Lawrence
- Massimo Serato as Emiliano
- Roman Barrett as Newman
- Luciano Pigozzi as Manolo, the barber
- Daniel Martin as Miner
- Charo López as Jessica
- José Calvo as Joselito Cosorito
- José Nieto as Sheriff Mortimer
- Goffredo Unger as Chris
- Mario Morales as Miguel
- Francisco Sanz as Telegraphist
- Fabian Conde as Miner
- Barbara Pignaton as Whore
- Miguel del Castillo as Shaffer, the bank cashier
- Rufino Inglés as Sheriff
- José Luis Lluch as Redfield Henchman
- Mario Novelli as Alan, Redfield Henchman
- Joaquín Parra (actor) as Bob, Redfield Henchman
- Riccardo Petrazzi as Redfield Henchman
- Renzo Pevarello as Redfield Henchman
- Tomás Picó as Miner
