= Diana Lorys =

Spanish actress

- Born: Ana María Cazorla Vega; 20 October 1940 (age 85); Madrid, Spain
- Occupation: Actor
- Years active: 1960-present

Diana Lorys (born Ana María Cazorla Vega; 20 October 1940) is a Spanish actress. She has appeared in more than 50 films since 1960.

== Filmography ==
Year	Title	Role	Notes
1960	Pelusa		
1961	Festival		
1961	Usted puede ser un asesino	Lulú	
1961	La rivolta dei mercenari	Nora	
1961	La bella Mimí	Bailarina	
1961	Regresa un desconocido	Alicia	
1961	Hola, muchacho		
1962	Salto mortal	Lucía	
1962	La mentira tiene cabellos rojos	Vecina	Uncredited
1962	The Awful Dr. Orloff	Wanda Bronsky / Melissa	
1962	Shades of Zorro	Mestiza	
1963	Bochorno	Ofelia	
1964	Gunfighters of Casa Grande	Gitana, Daylight's Girl	
1964	Backfire	Rosetta	
1964	I gemelli del Texas	Fanny	
1964	La carga de la policía montada	Flower of the Mountains	
1965	Murrieta	Kate	
1965	I tre del Colorado	Nela, the Saloon Girl	
1966	Lightning Bolt	Captain Patricia Flanagan / Agent 36-22-36	
1966	The Texican	Kit O'Neal	
1966	Residencia para espías	Janet Spokane	
1967	The Devil's Man	Yasmin	
1967	Novios 68	Conchita	
1967	L'uomo del colpo perfetto	Huguette	
1968	Superargo and the Faceless Giants	Gloria Devon	
1968	No desearás la mujer de tu prójimo	Matilde	
1968	Villa Rides	Emilita	
1968	Sonora		Uncredited
1968	White Comanche		Uncredited
1968	O.K. Yevtushenko	Galina Samarav	
1969	Malenka	Bertha Zemis	
1969	Battle of the Commandos	Jannie	
1970	The Bloody Judge	Sally Gaunt	Uncredited
1970	Verano 70	Luisa	
1971	Kill Django... Kill First	Money	
1971	Blackie the Pirate	Manuela	
1971	El diablo Cojuelo	Doña Desconsuelo	
1971	Blindman	Bride	Uncredited
1971	Bad Man's River	Dolores	
1972	Ligue story	Juanita	
1972	Sex Charade		
1972	Les cauchemars naissent la nuit	Anna de Istria	
1973	Las juergas de 'El Señorito'	Merche / Elena	
1973	Don Quijote cabalga de nuevo	Moza del juicio ante Sancho Panza	
1973	Chino	Indian	
1974	Proceso a Jesús	Interprete de María Magdalena	
1974	Blue Eyes of the Broken Doll	Claude	
1974	Siete chacales	Maria	
1975	Get Mean	Princess Elizabeth Maria de Burgos	
1976	La lozana andaluza	Napolitana	
1977	Las marginadas	Rosa	
1977	California	Betty	
1978	La ciudad maldita	Dinah	
2007	Un hombre de porvenir	Natalia Spirelli	(final film role)
