= Cavalry Charge (film) =

1964 film

- La carga de la policía montada
- Directed by: Ramón Torrado
- Screenplay by: Bautista Lacasa Nebot; Manuel Tamayo; Ramón Torrado
- Story by: Bautista Lacasa Nebot
- Starring: Alan Scott; Frank Latimore; María Silva; Diana Lorys
- Cinematography: Ricardo Torres
- Music by: Daniel White
- Production company: Trébol Films C.C.
- Distributed by: Regia-Arturo González Rodríguez
- Release date: 1964
- Running time: 101 min
- Country: Spain

Cavalry Charge (Spanish: La carga de la policía montada) is a 1964 Spanish adventure western film directed by Ramón Torrado, written by Bautista Lacasa Nebot, scored by Daniel White and starring Alan Scott, Frank Latimore and Diana Lorys. It place an emphasis on the Francoist patria.

== Cast ==
- Alan Scott as Commander Inspector John Bedford
- Frank Latimore as Corporal Paul White
- Diana Lorys as Flower of the Mountains
- Mary Silvers as Valerie Jackson
- Alfonso Rojas as Sergeant Custer
- Bernabe Barta Barri as Trapper Don Halsey
- Rufino Inglés
- Fernando Bilbao as Brighton
- Rafael Hernández as Scout Adams
- Tito García as Fur Trader Peter Barton
- José Truchado as Chief Brown Bear
- Juan Cortés as Storekeeper Jackson
- Xan das Bolas
- Alfonso de la Vega as Trapper John
- Luis Barboo as Trapper
- Guillermo Méndez as Colonel McCloud
- Javier Inglés
- Antonio Moreno
- Ricardo G. Lilló
- Frank Braña
