= Woman training for a Republican militia =

Photograph by Gerda Taro

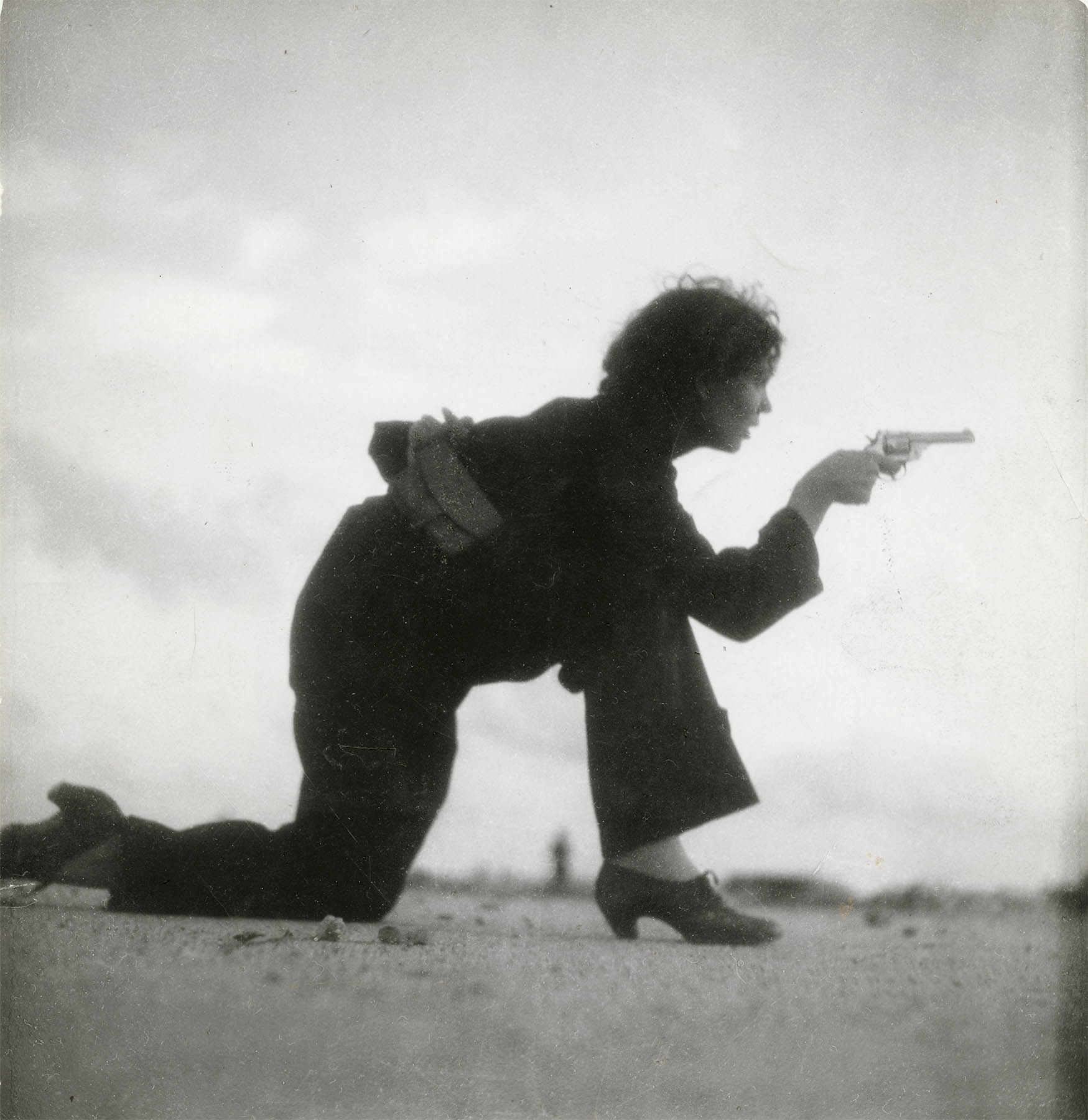
Woman training for a Republican militia by Gerda Taro (1936)

Woman training for a Republican militia is a famous photograph by German photographer Gerda Taro (1910–1937) during the Spanish Civil War in 1936, taken on Somorrostro beach in Barcelona.

The photography depicts a female republican militia member on the Somorrostro beach of la Barceloneta neighborhood.

== See also ==
- List of photographs considered the most important
