= Hands of a Gunfighter =

1965 film

- Directed by: Rafael Romero Marchent
- Written by: Joaquín Romero Hernández
- Music by: Angelo Francesco Lavagnino
- Release date: 1965
- Running time: 88 minutes
- Country: Italy
- Language: Italian

Hands of a Gunfighter (Spanish: Ocaso de un pistolero, Italian: Il destino di un pistolero, also known as Hands of Gunman) is a 1965 Spanish-Italian western film directed by Rafael Romero Marchent.

== Cast ==
- Craig Hill as Dan Murphy
- Gloria Milland as Laura Murphy
- Piero Lulli as Davy Carter
- Carlos Romero Marchent as Pat Davis
- Conchita Núñez as Margaret Dixon
- Jesús Puente as Sheriff Robert Rogers
- José Guardiola as John Carter
- Ralph Baldwin as Mack
- Paco Sanz as Alex Dixon
- John Bartha as Sheriff Fred
- Hugo Blanco as Charlie Carter
- Francisco José Huetos as Andy
- Lorenzo Robledo as Slim Carter
- Rufino Inglés as Barman
- Luis Induni as Capataz de Castle
- Goyo Lebrero as a drunk
- José Villasante as Henry
- Jesús Guzmán as Juez
- Sultán as Custer
- Agustín Bescos as a Barman
- Emilio Rodríguez as a citizen
