= El extraño viaje =

- Spanish film poster
- Directed by: Fernando Fernán Gómez
- Written by: Pedro Beltrán; Manuel Ruiz Castillo
- Story by: Luis García Berlanga
- Starring: Carlos Larrañaga; Jesús Franco
- Cinematography: José F. Aguayo
- Edited by: Rosa G. Salgado
- Music by: Cristóbal Halffter
- Release date: 21 November 1964
- Running time: 91 minutes
- Country: Spain
- Language: Spanish

El extraño viaje (English: The Strange Journey) is a 1964 Spanish black drama film directed by Fernando Fernán Gómez. Film director Jess Franco acts as the brother of the protagonist. The film was a huge flop on its limited release due to Francoist's censorship. It was voted seventh best Spanish film by professionals and critics in 1996 Spanish cinema centenary.

The film was included in a list published by Pedro Almodovar at the British Film Institute as one of the 13 great Spanish movies that inspired his career.

== Plot summary ==
In a large house in the middle of a little Spanish town live Venancio and Paquita, the childlike brother and sister of Ignacia, who bullies them continuously. Suspecting that she has a visitor after dark, they start snooping and one night she turns on them in fury. As she is throttling Paquita, Venancio brains her with a bottle and the two hide the body. After leaving town in the dark by taxi, they are then found dead on a beach.

The house is put up for sale and the owner of the bar next door has to empty the vats where he was storing his wine. When at the bottom of one is found the corpse of Ignacia, her secret lover Fernando admits all to the examining magistrate. He was a member of the band that played in the bar in the evenings and used to slip into Ignacia's house after work. When he found her dead, he helped Venancio and Paquita dispose of the body. Then he took them away to the sea, where he gave them knockout drops so that he could escape with Ignacia's money. Unfortunately, his dose was too powerful.

== Cast ==
- Carlos Larrañaga — Fernando
- Tota Alba — Ignacia Vidal
- Lina Canalejas — Beatriz
- Sara Lezana — Angelines
- Rafaela Aparicio — Paquita Vidal
- Jesus Franco — Venancio Vidal
- Luis Marín — Músico
- María Luisa Ponte — Mercera
