= La ciudad maldita =

1978 film directed by Juan Bosch

- Directed by: Juan Bosch
- Written by: Juan Bosch; Alberto De Stefanis
- Based on: Red Harvest by Dashiell Hammett
- Produced by: José María Cunillés; Antonio Girasante; Alberto Grimaldi; Luis Marin
- Starring: Chet Bakon; Diana Lorys; Roberto Camardiel; Daniel Martín
- Cinematography: Gino Santini
- Edited by: José Antonio Rojo
- Music by: Franco Julian
- Production companies: Films Dara; Produzioni Europee Associati
- Distributed by: Multivideo
- Release date: 29 November 1978 (Italy)
- Running time: 91 min
- Countries: Italy; Spain

La ciudad maldita (known in Italian as La Notte rossa del falcon) is a 1978 Spanish-Italian Spaghetti Western murder mystery film directed by Juan Bosch. The film was written by Alberto De Stefanis, produced by José María Cunillés, scored by Franco Julian, and starring Diana Lorys, Luciano Pigozzi, Roberto Camardiel and Daniel Martín. It is based on the novel Red Harvest, by Dashiell Hammett, inspired in Yojimbo, by Kurosawa, and A Fistful of Dollars, by Sergio Leone.

== Cast ==
- Chet Bakon as OP
- Diana Lorys as Dinah
- Roberto Camardiel as Sheriff Noonan
- Daniel Martín as Max Thaler
- Nat Graywood
- Adolfo Thous
- Alan Collins as Don Wilson
- Eduardo Bea
- Frank Clement
- Francisco Casares
- Manuela Aleardi
- Lone Fleming
- Antonio Mayans (as José Antonio Mayans)
- José Yepes
- Jesús Enguita
- Antonio Molino Rojo as Peter
