= Fabio Testi =

Italian actor (born 1941)

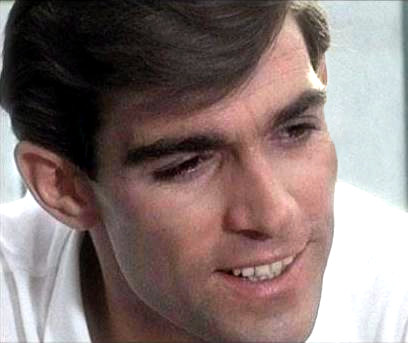
- Fabio Testi in The Garden of the Finzi-Continis (1970)
- Born: 2 August 1941 (age 84); Peschiera del Garda, Italy
- Occupation: Actor
- Spouse(s): Lola Navarro (m. 1984–1996)
- Partner: Ursula Andress (1973–1977)
- Children: 3

Fabio Testi (born 2 August 1941) is an Italian actor. After growing up witnessing film work done around Lake Garda, Testi entered the sets of the film and began work as a stuntman and a double on set, where he worked as a stuntman on The Good, the Bad and the Ugly. Testi continued stunt work and getting roles in low budget genre films until he was cast in Vittorio De Sica's film The Garden of the Finzi-Continis. Following this film, Testi became a star in Italy, appearing in some artistic films by Giuseppe Patroni Griffi and Claude Chabrol. Testi also continued to work in poliziotteschi genre films in the 1970s as well as a few gialli, and gained infamy for his publicised relationships with actresses Ursula Andress and Charlotte Rampling.

Testi's popularity as an actor slowed towards the 1980s after which he predominantly worked in television series. By the early 2000s, Testi also began appearing in reality shows such as Gran Hermano VIP. Since 2006 he has been involved in Italian politics, running for Mayor of Verona as a member of Cattolici Liberali Cristiani.

== Biography ==
Fabio Testi was born on 2 August 1941 in Peschiera del Garda on the Lake Garda in Northern Italy. A number of adventure and pirate films were shot at this lake which led him to enter the sets of these films originally as a stuntman and as a double. He initially took these roles in film and television work as a way of paying for his architecture degree, but later chose to enter film work. Among early work, Testi was a stunt double in Sergio Leone's The Good, the Bad, and the Ugly. He also played in Leone's follow-up as one of Henry Fonda's henchmen. Most of Testi's role in the film was cut except for one shot, as Leone felt that Testi was too clean-looking for the film.

Demofilo Fidani gave Testi his first on-screen role in his film Straniero... fatti il segno della croce! (transl. Stranger, Make the Sign of the Cross) Testi continued his career doing what film historian and critic Roberto Curti described as "low-grade genre" films including a Zorro film The Avenger, Zorro by Rafael Romero Marchent, the thriller Death Knocks Twice with Anita Ekberg and singer Dean Reed by Harald Philipp, and more films by Fidani such as One Damned Day at Dawn… Django Meets Sartana! where he played the role of Sartana. While director Fidani was scouting locations for the film Jungle Master, he met Vittorio De Sica who was also location scouting at the Orto Botanico dell'Università di Roma "La Sapienza". Fidani recalled that the two directors spoke: De Sica was looking for a younger Latin actor but couldn't find anyone, and asked Fidani if he knew any. Fidani stated he knew an actor who "can't act to save his life, but with you as a guide ... you know, I never have enough time, I always go for the first take'" Fidani stated later that upon discovering that Testi had been cast by De Sica, he had made Testi cut his hair. Curti noted that Fidani had a "notorious habit of embellishing his own career and filmography" and that the story may not be true.

Testi was cast in The Garden of the Finzi-Continis which won De Sica an Academy Award. Following the release of the film, Testi became a big box office name in Italy. He continued to do genre films as well as artistic films such as Giuseppe Patroni Griffi's 'Tis Pity She's a Whore, Denys de la Patelliere's Le Tueur and Claude Chabrol's Nada and Andrzej Zulawski's That Most Important Thing: Love. In the 1970s, Testi also worked on several genre films, predominantly crime films such as Pasquale Squitieri's Gang War in Naples, Sergio Sollima's Blood in the Streets, Tonino Valerii's Go Gorilla Go and Enzo G. Castellari's The Big Racket. Testi also did work in giallo films, such as Massimo Dallamano's What Have You Done to Solange? and Alberto Negrin's Red Rings of Fear. Testi also worked Lucio Fulci on two of his films: Four of the Apocalypse and Contraband.

Testi was cast in a role intended for Maurizio Merli in Stelvio Massi's Speed Cross and Speed Driver. Testi fell out of popularity in film by the 1980s showing up in Gianfranco Baldanello's thriller The Uranium Conspiracy and Silvio Amadio's drama A Gun for a Cop. From the eighties onward, Testi predominantly worked in television, such as Castellari's mini-series The Return of Sandokan where he replaced Philippe Leroy as Yanez. Testi also began showing up in television reality shows such as L'isola dei famosi in 2003, the Spanish show El gran hermano in 2005. In the late 2000s, Testi entered politics, where he ran for mayor in Verona.

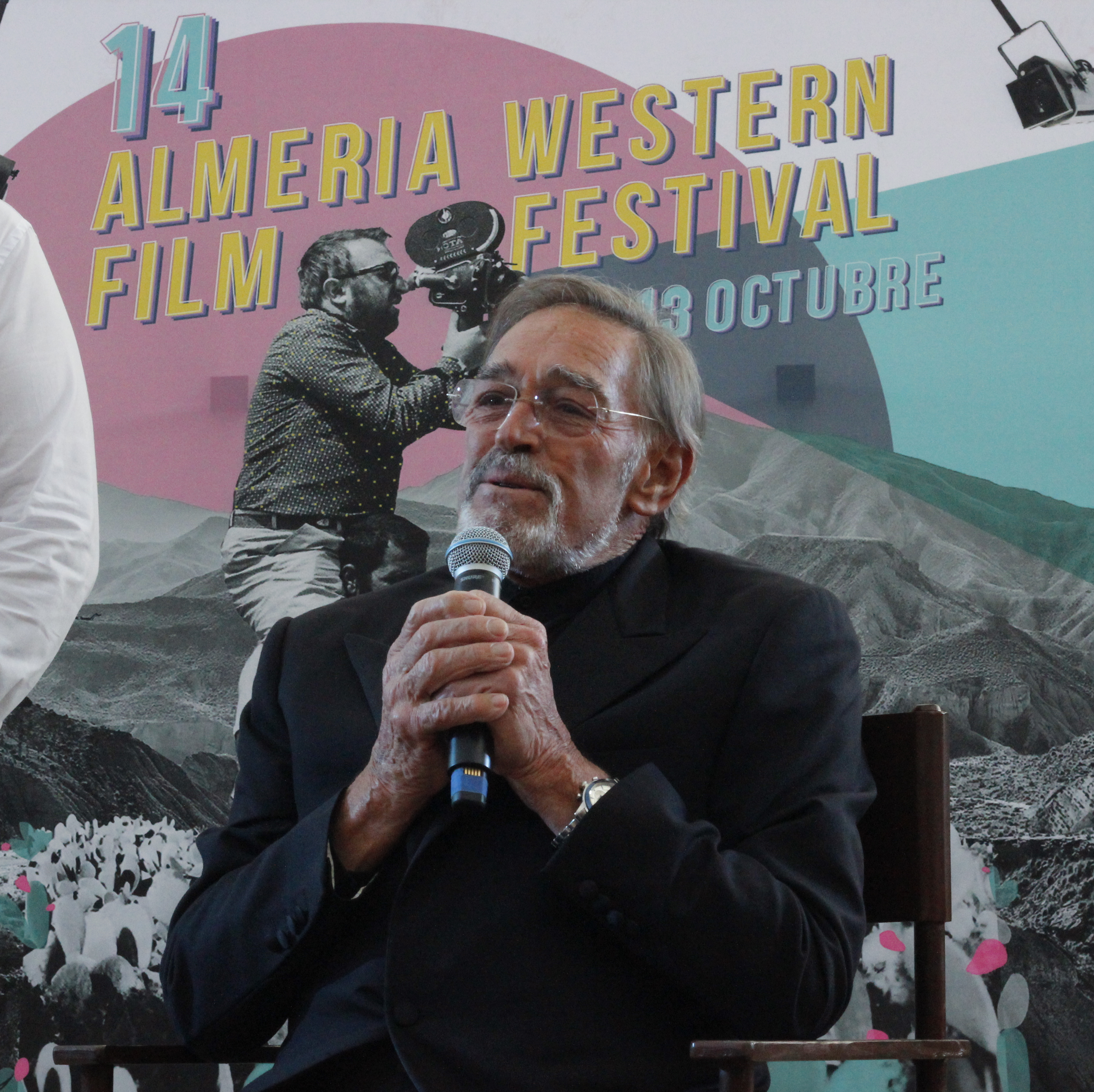
Fabio Testi during the 14th Almeria Western Film Festival.

On 5 October 2024 he received the Nosferatu Award at Festival Internacional de Cinema Fantàstic de Catalunya in Sitges, and on 10 October he received the Tabernas de Cine Award in the 14th Almeria Western Film Festival.

== Personal life ==
Testi was known to be in relationships with several actresses, including Edwige Fenech, Charlotte Rampling, Lynne Frederick, Ursula Andress and Jean Seberg. His longest relationship was with Spanish actress Lola Navarro, whom he began dating in the late 1970s and had three children with. The two married in 1984 and separated in 1996. As of 2013, Testi was focusing on his interest in agriculture, and owned the third largest kiwi farm in Italy. He considers himself Roman Catholic.

== Selected filmography ==
| Year | Title | Role | Director(s) | Notes | Ref(s) |
|---|---|---|---|---|---|
| 1968 | And Now... Make Your Peace with God | Sanders | Demofilo Fidani | | |
| 1968 | Straniero... fatti il segno della Croce! | —N/a | Demofilo Fidani | | |
| 1970 | One Damned Day at Dawn… Django Meets Sartana! | Sartana | Demofilo Fidani | | |
| 1970 | The Garden of the Finzi-Continis | Malnate | Vittorio De Sica | | |
| 1971 | Dead Men Ride | Roy | Aldo Florio | | |
| 1972 | The Avenger, Zorro | Zorro | Rafael Romero Marchent | | |
| 1972 | Le Tueur | Georges Gassot | Denys de la Patellière | | |
| 1972 | What Have You Done to Solange? | Enrico "Henry" Rosseni | Massimo Dallamano | | |
| 1972 | Gang War in Naples | Tonino Russo | Pasquale Squitieri | | |
| 1973 | Revolver | Milo Ruiz | Sergio Sollima | | |
| 1973 | Stateline Motel | Floyd Gambino | Maurizio Lucidi | | |
| 1974 | Nada | Diaz | Claude Chabrol | | |
| 1974 | Blood Brothers | Don Gaetano Frungillo | Pasquale Squitieri | | |
| 1975 | That Most Important Thing: Love | Servais Mont | Andrzej Zulawski | | |
| 1975 | Giubbe rosse | Bill Cormack | Joe D'Amato | | |
| 1975 | Four of the Apocalypse | Stubby Preston | Lucio Fulci | | |
| 1975 | Go Gorilla Go | Marco Sartori | Tonino Valerii | | |
| 1976 | The Big Racket | Inspector Nico Palmieri | Enzo G. Castellari | | |
| 1977 | The Heroin Busters | Fabio | Enzo G. Castellari | | |
| 1977 | China 9, Liberty 37 | Clayton Drumm | Monte Hellman | | |
| 1978 | Red Rings of Fear | Inspektor Gianni Di Salvo | Alberto Negrin | | |
| 1980 | Contraband | Luca Ajello | Lucio Fulci | | |
| 2005 | Torrente 3: el protector | Montellini Roures | Santiago Segura | | |
| 2025 | Reflection in a Dead Diamond | John Diman | Hélène Cattet; Bruno Forzani | | |
