= María Silva (actress) =

Spanish actress

- Born: María Jesús Marín Rodríguez; August 16, 1941; Palencia, Spain
- Died: March 17, 2023 (aged 81)
- Occupation: Actress
- Years active: 1959-1988

María Silva (16 August 1941 – 17 March 2023) was a Spanish film and television actress.

She was born on 16 August 1941 in Palencia. She made her debut in 1959 with the stage name Mara Silva, including Don José, Pepe y Pepito (1959) or Margarita se llama mi amor (1961). During the 1960s she gained recognition on spaghetti western films and thrillers like El sátiro (1970). At the end of 1960s she performed in zarzuelas for Televisión Española under the direction of Juan de Orduña. She retired from the big screen at the beginning of 1990.

She died on 17 March 2023 at the age of 81.

== Partial filmography ==
- Una gran señora (1959) - Modelo
- The Last Days of Pompeii (1959) - Julia's Maid
- La fiel infantería (1960)
- Don José, Pepe y Pepito (1961)
- Margarita se llama mi amor (1961) - Alumna que se sienta junto a Nacho
- Siempre es domingo (1961) - Amiga de Carlota
- Pecado de Amor (1961) - Novia y esposa de Ángel Vega
- The Awful Dr. Orlof (1962) - Dany
- Zorro the Avenger (1962) - Irene
- Terrible Sheriff (1962) - Clementine
- Shades of Zorro (1962) - Irene
- You Have the Eyes of a Deadly Woman (1962)
- Cristo negro (1963) - Mary Janson
- Tela de araña (1963) - Chica del club
- The Betrothed (1964) - Lucia Mondella
- La muerte silba un blues (1964) - Rosita
- El rapto de T.T. (1964)
- Cavalry Charge (1964) - Valerie Jackson
- Los cuatreros (1965) - Mary Thompson
- Vereda de Salvação (1965)
- 002 Operazione Luna (1965) - Dr. Frausink
- I due parà (1965) - Santa
- The Wild Ones of San Gil Bridge (1966)
- Los celos y el duende (1967) - Lucía
- Kill the Wickeds (1967) - Shelley
- Los subdesarrollados (1968) - Laly
- Ballad of a Bounty Hunter (1968) - Isabel Alvarez
- La dinamita está servida (1968) - Olga
- O.K. Yevtushenko (1968) - Pandora Loz
- El huésped del sevillano (1970) - Raquel
- Un par de asesinos (1970) - María Anderson
- When Heroes Die (1970) - Nicole
- Presagio (1970) - Berta Reinaldi
- Tombs of the Blind Dead (1972) - Maria
- Al diablo, con amor (1973)
- El Retorno de Walpurgis (1973) - Elizabeth Bathory
- Me has hecho perder el juicio (1973)
- Un par de zapatos del '32 (1974) - School Teacher
- Odio mi cuerpo (1974) - Mary Knoll
- The Mummy's Revenge (1975) - Abigail
- Devil's Kiss (1976) - Susan
- Nunca es tarde (1977) - Coro
- Esperando a papá (1980) - Laura
- El lobo negro (1981)
- 127 millones libres de impuestos (1981) - Claudia
- Duelo a muerte (1981) - Marquesa
- El lío de papá (1985) - Nuria
- La monja alférez (1987)
- Caminos de tiza (1988)
- Hacienda somos casi todos (1988)

== Bibliography ==
- Peter Cowie & Derek Elley. World Filmography: 1967. Fairleigh Dickinson University Press, 1977.
