= La Singla (film) =

- Theatrical release poster
- Directed by: Paloma Zapata
- Screenplay by: Paloma Zapata
- Produced by: Paloma Zapata; Nadja Smith; Paola Sáinz de Baranda
- Starring: Helena Kaittani; Antonia Singla
- Cinematography: Iñaki Gorraiz; Dani Mauri
- Edited by: Paloma Zapata
- Music by: Juliane Heinemann
- Production companies: La Fábrica naranja; Malandar Films; Inselfilm Produktion
- Distributed by: Atera Films
- Release dates: March 2023 (Thessaloniki); 10 November 2023 (Spain)
- Countries: Spain; Germany
- Language: Spanish

La Singla is a 2023 Spanish-German documentary film written and directed by Paloma Zapata about Flamenco dancer Antonia Singla.

== Plot ==
The film explores the career of deaf Romani flamenco bailaora La Singla, following the research on the subject carried out by young flamenco teacher and writer Helena.

== Cast ==
- Antonia Singla "La Singla"
- Helena Kaittani
- Adelfa Calvo
- María Alfonsa Rosso
- Isabel Steva Hernández "Colita"
- Juan Miguel Rother "Miguel Vargas"
- María Ángeles Narváez Anguita "La Niña del Silencio"
- Natalia Marín López

== Production ==
The film is a Spanish-German co-production by La Fábrica Naranja, Malandar Films and Inselfilm Produktion and it had the participation of Arte/ZDF, Canal Sur, TVC and Movistar Plus+, and backing from ICEC, ICAA, and Creative Europe's MEDIA.

== Release ==
The film premiered at the 25th Thessaloniki International Documentary Festival in March 2023. It also screened at the Teatro Cervantes during the 26th Málaga Film Festival on 15 March 2023. Distributed by Atera Films, it was released theatrically in Spain on 10 November 2023.

== Reception ==
Carlos Pérez de Ziriza of Mondosonoro rated the film 8 out of 10 points deeming it to be "an ode to the torrential power of music and also a vindication of collective memory".

Philipp Engel of La Vanguardia rated the film 4 out of 5 stars, deeming it to be "a unique story, told as an investigative thriller starring Helena Kaittani from Córdoba".

== Accolades ==
| Year | Award | Category | Nominee(s) | Result | Ref. |
|---|---|---|---|---|---|
| 2024 | 11th Feroz Awards | 'Arrebato' Special Award (non-Fiction) | | Won | |
| 2024 | 3rd Carmen Awards | Best Actress | Helena Kaittani | Nominated | |
| 2024 | 3rd Carmen Awards | Best Documentary Film | | Nominated | |

== See also ==
- List of Spanish films of 2023
