= Prey of Vultures =

1972 film by Rafael Romero Marchent

- Un dólar de recompensa
- Directed by: Rafael Romero Marchent
- Written by: Ernesto Gastaldi; José Luis Navarro
- Screenplay by: Fernando Popoli; Rafael Romero Marchent
- Story by: Luis Gaspar; Rafael Romero Marchent
- Produced by: Luciano Martino
- Starring: Peter Lee Lawrence; Carlos Romero Marchent; Orchidea De Santis; Alfredo Mayo
- Cinematography: Mario Capriotti
- Edited by: Antonio Gimeno
- Music by: Nora Orlandi
- Production companies: Copercines, Cooperativa Cinematográfica; Devon Film
- Distributed by: Chamartín
- Release date: 22 April 1972 (Italy)
- Running time: 87 min
- Country: Spain

Prey of Vultures, The Artist Is a Gunfighter or Revenge of the Resurrected (Spanish: Un dólar de recompensa) is a 1972 Spanish Spaghetti Western film directed by Rafael Romero Marchent, written by Luis Gaspar, scored by Nora Orlandi and starring Peter Lee Lawrence, Alfredo Mayo, Carlos Romero Marchent and Frank Braña

== Cast ==
- Peter Lee Lawrence as Danny Lom
- Orchidea De Santis as Janet Sullivan
- Carlos Romero Marchent as Lou Stafford
- Andrés Mejuto as Sheriff Sullivan
- Eduardo Calvo as Doc Jeremiah Dempsey
- Dada Gallotti as Carol Wolley
- Raf Baldassarre as Joe Porter, Blacksmith
- Luis Induni as Mr. O'Hara
- Emilio Rodríguez as Henry Davies, Storekeeper
- Alfredo Mayo as John Wolley
- Frank Braña as Judge
- Antonio Almorós as Stagecoach Passenger
- Miguel del Castillo as Wolley Friend
- Rufino Inglés as Townsman
- Lorenzo Robledo as Mathathy Johnson, Barber
- María Vico as Stagecoach Passenger
