= Carlos Romero Marchent =

Spanish actor (1944–2013)

Carlos Romero Marchent (22 February 1944 – 19 August 2013) was a Spanish film actor, son of Joaquín Romero Marchent and brother of Rafael Romero Marchent, who directed Spaghetti Western films, Joaquín Luis Romero Marchent, and film editor Ana María Romero Marchent.

He began at the end of 1950s with films like Saeta rubia, El hombre que viajaba despacito, Un fantasma llamado amor, El hombre del paraguas blanco and El día de los enamorados, alongside Concha Velasco and Tony Leblanc. In the 1960s he appeared in spaghetti western films like La venganza del Zorro, Cabalgando hacia la muerte, Ocaso de un pistolero and La muerte cumple condena. At the end of 1970s he appeared in the TV series Curro Jiménez, where he played Gastón, and Cañas y barro, where he played the role of Sangonera.

He died on 19 August 2013 at the age of 69.

== Filmography ==
| Year | Title | Role | Notes |
|---|---|---|---|
| 1956 | Un fantasma llamado amor | | |
| 1956 | Saeta rubia | Chico | |
| 1957 | El hombre que viajaba despacito | Niño | |
| 1958 | El hombre del paraguas blanco | Hijo del alcalde | |
| 1959 | La vida alrededor | | |
| 1959 | El día de los enamorados | Botones | |
| 1961 | Las estrellas | Manolo Ortiz 'Barberito' | |
| 1962 | Zorro the Avenger | Chema | |
| 1962 | The Shadow of Zorro | Chema | |
| 1963 | Bochorno | | |
| 1963 | La chica del trébol | Juan | |
| 1963 | Three Ruthless Ones | Charlie | |
| 1964 | Rueda de sospechosos | Rafael García | |
| 1965 | Seven Hours of Gunfire | Ted | |
| 1965 | Hands of a Gunfighter | Pat Davis | |
| 1966 | Dollars for a Fast Gun | Miguel, Pedro's Assistant | |
| 1966 | Nuevo en esta plaza | Muletilla burlón | |
| 1968 | Ballad of a Bounty Hunter | Bandido | |
| 1968 | Dead Men Don't Count | Forrest Hijo | |
| 1969 | El mejor del mundo | Carlos | |
| 1969 | Garringo | Bob | Uncredited |
| 1969 | The Avenger, Zorro | Fred Macaslim | |
| 1970 | Arizona Colt Returns' | | |
| 1970 | Sartana Kills Them All | Donald Kirby | |
| 1971 | Long Live Your Death | Mexican Rider | Uncredited |
| 1972 | Prey of Vultures | Lou Stafford | |
| 1972 | Cut-Throats Nine | Slim | |
| 1973 | Disco rojo | Luis | |
| 1973 | Santo contra el doctor Muerte | Paul, Agent 9004 | |
| 1974 | La boda o la vida | | |
| 1975 | El clan de los Nazarenos | Padre José | |
| 1975 | | | |
| 1982 | Las chicas del bingo | Antoñito | (final film role) |
