= Festival Flamenco Gitano =

Festival Flamenco Gitano was a flamenco group of the 1960s which toured Europe and the Americas, started in 1965 by German organizers. It featured Paco de Lucia, Ramon de Algeciras, Antoñita Singla, Camarón de la Isla and other numerous artists over the years. It has been described as "a showcase of the hottest flamenco talent at the time", and de Lucia was billed as "The Paganini of the Flamenco Guitar".

Various CD albums have been released featuring these shows.
