= Three Ruthless Ones =

1964 film

- Spanish: El sabor de la venganza
- Directed by: Joaquin L. Romero Marchent
- Screenplay by: Joaquín Luis Romero Marchent; Jesús Navarro Carrión; Rafael Romero Marchent
- Story by: Joaquín Luis Romero Marchent; Jesús Navarro Carrión; Rafael Romero Marchent
- Produced by: Félix Durán Aparicio; Adriano Merkel
- Starring: Richard Harrison; Gloria Milland; Robert Hundar; Fernando Sancho
- Cinematography: Rafael Pacheco
- Edited by: Mercedes Alonso
- Music by: Riz Ortolani
- Production companies: Centauro Films; Produzioni Europee Associate (PEA)
- Distributed by: Materna Film-Verleih; Andrés Salvador Molina; Magic Video II; Mike Hunter Video; Toleratus Films Andrés Salvador Moli; Toleratus Films S.A.; Wild East Productions
- Release dates: 8 February 1964 (Italy); 4 May 1964 (Spain)
- Running time: 97 min
- Countries: Spain; Italy

Three Ruthless Ones, Gunfight at High Noon, Sons of Vengeance or Eye for an Eye (Spanish: El sabor de la venganza) is a 1964 Spanish/Italian western film directed by Joaquin L. Romero Marchent, produced by Alberto Grimaldi, scored by Riz Ortolani, and starring Richard Harrison, Raf Baldassare and Gloria Milland.

It was shot in Almería.

== Cast ==
- Richard Harrison as Jeff Walker
- Fernando Sancho as Pedro Ramirez
- Gloria Milland as Louise Walker
- Robert Hundar as Chet Walker
- Miguel Palenzuela as Brad Walker
- Gloria Osuna as Susannah Westfall
- Luis Induni as Westfall
- Carlos Romero Marchent as Charlie
- José Manuel Martín as Richard
- José Truchado as Palmer
- Francisco Sanz as Juez Klem
- Alfonso Rojas as Grayson
- Aldo Sambrell as Palmer Henchman
- Emilio Rodríguez as Comisario Merrill
- Indio González as Palmer Henchman
- Rufino Inglés as Miembro del jurado
- Joaquín Burgos as Miembro del jurado
- Dina Loy as May
- Magda Maldonado as Esposa de granjero
- José Riesgo as Clark Walker
- Rafael Vaquero as Granjero
- Miguel Merino as Hermano de Clark
- Ricardo Rodríguez as Palmer Henchman
- Ricardo G. Lilló as Hotel Clerk
- Marcelo Gonzalez
- Joaquín Bergía as Barman
- Pablito Alonso as Brad de niño
- Enrique Hernández as Chet de niño
- Luis Miguel Arranz as Jeff de niño
- Red Cameron
- Freddie Toehl as Rock
- Agustín Bescos as Ciudadano
- Pedro Fenollar as Ciudadano
- Antonio Orengo
- Rafael Romero Marchent as Ciudadano que se lava los pies
