= Gunfight at Red Sands =

1963 film

- Spanish film poster
- Directed by: Ricardo Blasco; Mario Caiano
- Written by: Albert Band; Ricardo Blasco; James Donald Prindle (story)
- Produced by: Albert Band; José Gutiérrez Maesso
- Starring: Richard Harrison; Mikaela; G.R. Stuart; Sara Lezana; Dan Martin; Barta Barry
- Cinematography: Massimo Dallamano
- Edited by: Rosa G. Salgado
- Music by: Ennio Morricone
- Release date: 19 September 1963
- Running time: 97 minutes
- Countries: Italy; Spain
- Language: Italian

Gunfight at Red Sands (Italian: Duello nel Texas, lit. 'Duel in Texas', Spanish: Gringo), also known as Gunfight in the Red Sands, is a 1963 Italian-Spanish international co-production directed by Ricardo Blasco and Mario Caiano, and produced by Albert Band as his first Spaghetti Western. It was also the first Western to feature a score by Ennio Morricone and the second Spaghetti Western to star Richard Harrison.

== Plot ==
Outside of Carterville, Texas, the sheepherding Martinez family has discovered gold on their land. Manuel, the wayward youngest son boasts about the fact under the influence of alcohol in a saloon. The next day three masked men ride to the Martinez house, where they murder the father, wound Manuel and steal the gold belonging to the family. Unaware of the crimes they committed, the three masked riders are seen by Richard Martinez, called "Gringo" who is an adopted Anglo-American son of the Martinez family. Gringo has been away for four years fighting with guerillas against the Mexican Government. Discovering the tragedies, Gringo seeks the help of Sheriff Lance Corbett to find the killers who Gringo can only identify by their horses. Gringo kills one of the men who attempts to ambush him and gradually discovers that certain people in the town of Carterville want to obtain the land of the Martinez family for themselves.

== Cast ==
- Richard Harrison as Ricardo "Gringo" Martinez
- G.R. Stuart as Sheriff Lance Corbett
- Mikaela as Maria Huertas
- Sara Lezana as Elisa 'Lisa' Martinez
- Dan Martin as Manuel Martinez
- Sam Field as Doctor Bancroft
- Barta Barry as Lou Stedman
- Ald Sambrell as Juan Guardo
- Agustín González as Risitas Wilson
- Bruna Simoniato as Rosa Cardena
- Barbara Simon as Rosa Cardena
- Ángel Solano as Miller
- Gonzalo Ezquiro as King Wilson
- Xan das Bolas as Barber
- José Calvo as Francisco
- José Luis Chinchilla as Hombre del sheriff
- Tito García as Herrero
- Rufino Inglés as Poker Player
- Alfonso Rojas as Don Esteban
- Rafael Vaquero as Tendero
- Guillermo Vera as Mexicano
