= Fall of the Mohicans =

1965 film by Mateo Cano

- Directed by: Mateo Cano
- Written by: Alain Baudry; Vinicio Marinucci
- Produced by: Angelo Faccenna; Marius Lesoeur
- Starring: Jack Taylor; Paul Muller; Sara Lezana
- Cinematography: Miguel Fernandez Mila
- Edited by: Antonio Gimeno
- Music by: Bruno Canfora; Angelo Francesco Lavagnino
- Production companies: Eguiluz Films; Ital Caribe Cinematografica
- Distributed by: I.E. International Cinehollywood
- Release date: 20 August 1965
- Running time: 85 minutes
- Countries: Spain; Italy
- Language: Italian

Fall of the Mohicans (Spanish: Uncas, el fin de una raza/ Uncas, The End of a Race, or Italian: L'ultimo dei Mohicani) is a 1965 Spanish-Italian historical western adventure film directed by Mateo Cano and starring Jack Taylor, Paul Muller and Sara Lezana. The film is based on James Fenimore Cooper's 1826 novel The Last of the Mohicans, but made in the style of a Spaghetti Western. It was shot on location in the Tabernas Desert of Almería Another adaptation of the story The Last Tomahawk was released the same year by Germany's Constantin Film.

== Story ==
In 1757 French troops take Fort William Henry. British Colonel Munro and his two daughters are captured by the Marques of Montcalm and offered to the Huron chief Cunning Fox.

== Cast ==
- Jack Taylor as Duncan Edward
- Paul Muller as Colonel Munro
- Sara Lezana as Cora Munro
- Daniel Martín as Uncas
- José Manuel Martín as Cunning Fox
- Barbara Loy as Alice Munro
- Luis Induni as Hawkeye
- José Marco as Chingachgook
- Carlos Casaravilla as Tamerind
- Rufino Inglés as Doctor
- Modesto Blanch as Brancourt
- Pedro Rodríguez de Quevedo as General Webb
- Alfonso del Real as Higgins
- José Riesgo as Soldier
- Lorenzo Robledo as Commander
- Pedro Fenollar as French Officer
- Pastor Serrador as Marquis de Montcalm
- Carlos Casaravilla as Tamenund

== Bibliography ==
- Bertil O. Österberg. Colonial America on Film and Television: A Filmography. McFarland, 15 Apr 2009.
