= Eva León =

Spanish musician

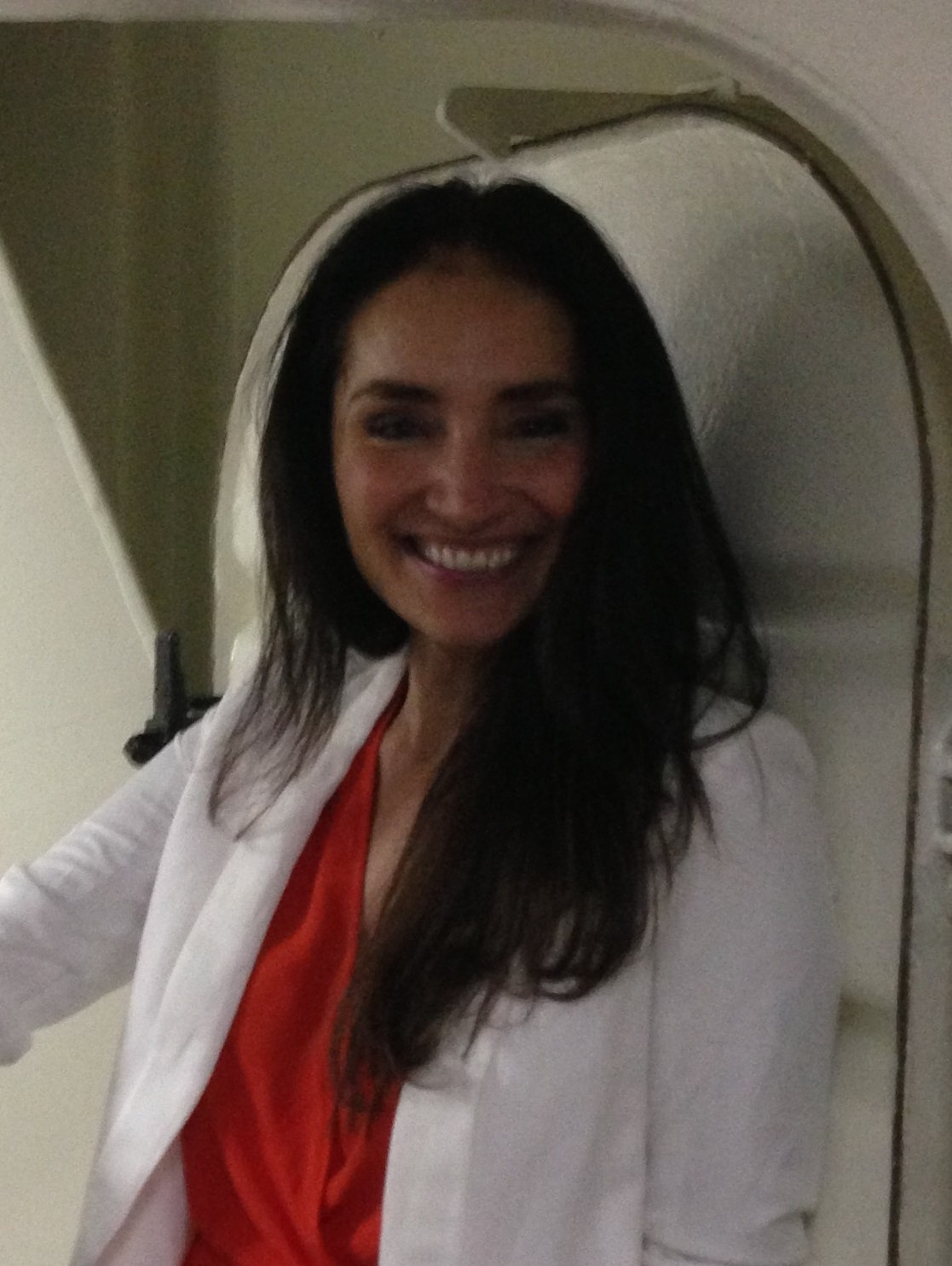
- León in 2013
- Born: Las Palmas, Gran Canaria, Canary Islands, Spain
- Occupation: Classical violinist
- Website: evaleon.com

Eva León is a Spanish violinist based in New York City.

In 2006, she won the 33rd Artists International Annual Debut Prize in New York and soon afterwards, she made her debut at Carnegie Hall. León has won the top prize at the Michaelangelo Abbado International Violin Competition.

== Early life and education ==
She was born and raised in Las Palmas, Canary Islands, Spain. Both her parents were music lovers and she attended her first concert at the age of 3. She started playing violin when she was 8.

At the age of 13, she moved away from her family to Barcelona to continue her violin studies under the tutelage of Xavier Turull. She also studied with Ruggiero Ricci (Salzburg), José Luis García Asensio (London), and Oleg Krysa (USA). She was awarded a scholarship to further her studies by the Foundation Güell, Musical Youth Foundation La Caixa, and the Association Sofía Puche. In 2000 she moved to New York to study with Neil Weintrob and was awarded her Master of Music degree from the Manhattan School of Music.

== Career ==
León started performing professionally at age 15. By age 18 she had won the Juventudes Musicales in Spain and at age 20 had her debut at Palau de la Música in Barcelona. She has performed in the United States, Europe, Latin America, the Middle East. She has recorded for television and for radio including Japanese National TV, the American National TV and Spanish National TV. She has performed with the Boston Classical Orchestra, Mexico State Symphony Orchestra, the Tenerife Symphony Orchestra, the Del Empordà Chamber Orchestra, the Galesburg Symphony, the Bratislava Chamber Orchestra, the Las Cruces Symphony the Rockford Symphony, the Colombia National Symphony, Castile and León Symphony Orchestra and Champaign-Urbana Symphony Orchestra and has worked with conductors such as Carlos Kalmar, Max Bragado-Darman, Steven Lipsitt, Enrique Bátiz, Steven Larsen and Baldur Bronniman.

León made her Carnegie Hall debut in 2006 and her Boston debut as soloist in Mendelssohn's Violin Concerto in 2009 playing with Steven Lipsitt and the Boston Classical Orchestra. She was featured at the Knox-Galesburg Symphony at its 60th anniversary concert 2009 held at the Orpheum Theatre. León performed Leonard Bernstein's unique reflection on love with The New Bedford Symphony Orchestra in 2012 at a Valentine's Day program.

In May 2009, León wrote an article titled, Discover the Chamber-music of Spanish Composer Joaquín Turina which was featured at the Master Class section at Strings Magazine.

She draws her influence from Johann Sebastian Bach and is a regular performer of Spanish composer Pablo de Sarasate.

=== Discography ===
León recorded her debut CD in 1996 with music by Grieg, Sarasate, Turull and Toldra for Moraleda Records. In 2009 she released her first CD for Naxos with music by Joaquín Turina, becoming the first Spanish violinist to record violin repertoire with them. She now has a multi-album record contract with Naxos. Recordings of Xavier Montsalvatge and Joaquín Rodrigo violin and piano music will be released under the same label.

In 2011, León was featured in Klassic Cat Records CD Consuelo Colomer.

== Reception ==
La Vanguardia wrote that León "has the power to captivate the five senses of her audience" and "on stage, she is an imposing presence, winning over [the audience] with her astonishing vitality and the energy of her interpretations." La Provincia, commenting about León's performance in 2009 wrote, "Fully substantive interpretation… the variety of the program reflects a curiosity, maturity and experience generally absent in young virtuosos … a combination of perfection and grace…wonderful acoustic flavor…a performer who will arouse much fascination."

The Boston Music Intelligencer wrote about her debut at Boston Classical Orchestra, "Ms. León showcased her strengths as a recitalist: expressive adagio playing, exploration of contrasts in articulation, and her ability to communicate emotion through both her visual and musical presentation… Ms. León’s mastery seemed to emerge naturally from the full string sound. In the final movement, Ms. León’s variety of expression and articulation won over the audience. She is full of youthful exuberance and fully involved in the emotional aspects of her delivery." Neue Presse of Germany wrote "charismatic violinist who possesses, along with her musical talent and tremendous aura, a gift for expression."

== Awards and honors ==
- Michaelangelo Abbado International Violin Competition – Top prize.
- Winner of the 33rd Artists International Annual Debut Prize in New York.
- Maria Canals International Music Competition – Laureate
- Winner of “Amics de Joan Massiá” Violin Competition as well as Best Interpreter of his work
- Winner of Juventudes Musicales of Spain
- Winner of the Ciudad de Soria Violin Competition.
