= The Avenger, Zorro =

1972 film

- Directed by: Rafael Romero Marchent
- Screenplay by: Rafael Romero Marchent; Nino Resa
- Story by: Rafael Romero Marchent
- Starring: Fabio Testi
- Cinematography: Marcello Masiocchi
- Edited by: Antonio Gimeno
- Music by: Coriolano Gori
- Release date: 21 February 1972
- Running time: 96 minutes
- Country: Italy/Spain

The Avenger, Zorro (Spanish: El Zorro justiciero, Italian: E continuavano a chiamarlo figlio di...) is a 1972 Spanish-Italian Western film written and directed by Rafael Romero Marchent.

== Cast ==
- Fabio Testi as Don Diego / Zorro
- Carlos Romero Marchent as Fred MacAslim
- Frank Braña as Dominguez
- Simone Blondell as Perla Dominguez
- Piero Lulli as Bill Warner
- Andrés Mejuto as Brook
- Eduardo Calvo as Richter
- Luis Induni as Sheriff
- Riccardo Garrone

== Release ==
The Avenger, Zorro was released on 21 February 1972.

== Footnotes ==
=== Sources ===
- Kinnard, Roy; Crnkovich, Tony (2017). Italian Sword and Sandal Films, 1908–1990. McFarland. ISBN 978-1476662916.
