= Rafael Romero Marchent =

Spanish actor, director, and screenwriter (1926–2020)

- Born: 3 May 1926; Madrid, Spain
- Died: 13 February 2020 (aged 93); Madrid, Spain
- Occupation: Director
- Spouse: María Tamayo López (-1991)
- Father: Joaquín Romero Marchent Gómez de Avellaneda (1899-1973)
- Relatives: Joaquín Luis Romero Marchent (1921–2012); Ana María Romero Marchent; Carlos Romero Marchent (1944-2013)

Rafael Romero Marchent (3 May 1926 – 13 February 2020) was a Spanish director, screenwriter and actor.

== Life and career ==
Born in Madrid, the son of the author Joaquín Romero Marchent Gómez de Avellaneda, he started his career as an actor, mainly cast in character roles. In 1959 he became assistant director, and in 1965 he made his directorial debut with Hands of a Gunfighter. Specialized in the Spaghetti Western genre, from the late 1970s he was also active on television. His brother Joaquín Luis Romero Marchent was also a director and screenwriter. In the 2000s he taught film and interpretation classes.

He was awarded in 1947 by the Medalla del Círculo de Escritores Cinematográficos for his role in the film La mies es mucha. He married Maruja Tamayo. He died on 13 February 2020 at the age of 93.

== Filmography ==
=== Director ===
- Hands of a Gunfighter (1965)
- Sharp-Shooting Twin Sisters (1966)
- Two Crosses at Danger Pass (1967)
- Ringo the Lone Rider (1968)
- One by One (1968)
- Dead Men Don't Count (1968)
- Garringo (1969)
- Awkward Hands (1970)
- Sartana Kills Them All (1971)
- The Avenger, Zorro (1972)
- Prey of Vultures (1972)
- El calor de la llama (1976)
- All Is Possible in Granada (1982)

=== Actor ===
- The Bullfighter's Suit (1947)
- Lola Leaves for the Ports (1947) - Curro Mairén
- Don Quixote (1947) - Lacayo (Lackey) (uncredited)
- Alhucemas (1948)
- La vida encadenada (1948)
- Doña María the Brave (1948) - paje Morales
- Mare Nostrum (1948) - Esteban
- The Party Goes On (1948) - Torero
- La mies es mucha (1949) - Modu
- Peace (1949) - Pedro
- Flor de lago (1950)
- Yo no soy la Mata-Hari (1950) - (uncredited)
- The Lioness of Castille (1951) - Juan de Padilla hijo
- The Seventh Page (1951) - Javier
- Juzgado permanente (1953)
- Cabaret (1953) - Pepe
- El mensaje (1954)
- The Louts (1954)
- Sor Angélica (1954)
- One Bullet Is Enough (1954)
- El indiano (1955) - Jaime
- La pecadora (1956) - Padre Antonio
- La espera (1956)
- Fulano y Mengano (1957) - Paco
- Un indiano en Moratilla (1958)
- El Cristo de los Faroles (1958) - Rafael
- Pasión bajo el sol (1958)
- Compadece al delincuente (1960)
- Zorro the Avenger (1962) - Juan Aguilar
- Three Ruthless Ones (1964) - Ciudadano que se lava los pies (uncredited)
- Seven Hours of Gunfire (1965) - Ciudadano que lee la carta (uncredited)
- All Is Possible in Granada (1982) - Camarero
- A solas contigo (1990) - Quintero
- Pesadilla para un rico (1996) - Portes
- Al límite (1997) - Juez 2º
- Tiovivo c. 1950 (2004) - Tertuliano
