= Murieta (film) =

1965 film

- Joaquín Murrieta
- Directed by: George Sherman
- Written by: James O'Hanlon
- Produced by: Francisco Molero; José Antonio Sáinz de Vicuña
- Starring: Jeffrey Hunter; Arthur Kennedy; Diana Lorys
- Cinematography: Miguel F. Mila
- Edited by: Alfonso Santacana
- Music by: Antonio Pérez Olea
- Production companies: Pro Artis Ibérica, S.A.
- Distributed by: Warner Bros. Pictures; Nora-Filmverleih; Ízaro Films; Warner-Pathé Distributors; Warner-Tonefilm; Divisa Home Video
- Release date: February 22, 1965 (Madrid)
- Running time: 107 min
- Country: United States

Murieta is a 1965 American biographical Western film directed by George Sherman and starring Jeffrey Hunter, Diana Lorys, Sara Lezana and Sancho Gracia. The film is about Joaquin Murrieta.

== Plot ==
Based on real life events - Mexican peasant Joaquin Murieta and his wife go north to California to prospect for gold, finding only one white person, a marshal, who will befriend them. But after Murieta is beaten and robbed, and his wife killed by bandits, Murieta takes out his vengeance by forming a gang of outlaws who rob the countryside. Murieta is eventually cornered by the marshal, who persuades him to end his crusade. But when Murieta is later wounded and convalescent, his gang operates a reign of terror without his knowledge, leading to his death at the marshal's hands in a final battle.

== Cast ==
- Jeffrey Hunter as Joaquín Murrieta
- Diana Lorys as Kate
- Arthur Kennedy as Capt. Love
- Roberto Camardiel as García 'Jack Tres Dedos'
- Sara Lezana as Rosita Murrieta
- Mike Brendel as Buck Winters
- Francisco Braña as Pistolero 1
- Gonzalo Esquiroz as Kiley - pistolero 2
- Fernando Villena as Pistolero 3
- Juan Cazalilla as Borrachín
- Héctor Quiroga as Tendero
- Julio Pérez Tabernero as Valenzuela
- María José Collado as Mejicana
- David Thompson as Comisario
- Andy Anza as Gomez
- Pedro Osinaga as Claudio 'Cucaracha'
- José Luis Chinchilla
- Sancho Gracia as Bandido de Murrieta
- Jose Halufi as Bandido de Murrieta
- Rufino Inglés
- Alfredo Muñiz
- Guillermo Méndez as Hombre en el saloon
- Enrique Santiago as Bandido de Murrieta
- Freddie Toehl as Conductor
