= Los Tarantos =

1963 film

- Directed by: Francisco Rovira Beleta
- Written by: Francisco Rovira Beleta; Alfredo Mañas
- Starring: Antonio Gades; Carmen Amaya
- Cinematography: Massimo Dallamano
- Edited by: Emilio Rodríguez
- Music by: Andrés Batista; Fernando García Morcillo; Emilio Pujol; José Solá
- Release date: 5 November 1963
- Running time: 112 minutes
- Country: Spain
- Language: Spanish

Los Tarantos is a 1963 Spanish musical drama film directed by Francisco Rovira Beleta. It was nominated for an Academy Award in the Best Foreign Film category.

The film is based on the play La historia de los Tarantos written by Alfredo Mañas, and inspired by Romeo and Juliet by William Shakespeare.

== Plot ==
The love between two gypsies, Juana La Zoronga and Rafael El Taranto, from different families in Barcelona, is thwarted by the enmity between their respective parents. Rafael sees Juana dance at a gypsy wedding and is captivated by her beauty and charm. They fall in love, aided by their younger siblings, who are secretly friends and sympathetic to the young lovers.

Juana earns the respect of Rafael's formidable mother, Angustias, through her spirit and grace in flamenco. However, her father Rosendo, an old beau of Rafael's mother, remains obstinate despite the pleas of Juana, Rafael, and Angustias. Juana's father offers her to his colleague, Curro, to make her forget about her romance with Rafael. But neither Juana nor Rafael can forget their love. Curro becomes arrogant, killing Rafael's friend Mojigondo and beating Juana when he suspects she has been meeting with Rafael. Desperate, Juana seeks Rafael out in his dovecote, and they have sex, planning to elope the following day. However, Curro, incited by Juana's brother Sancho, finds them together and kills them both. Rafael's brother subsequently hunts Curro down in his stables and kills him.

Angustias and Rosendo are united in their grief, and Juana's younger brother comforts Rafael's younger sister, showing that the feud will not continue any further.

== Cast ==
- Carmen Amaya ... Angustias
- Sara Lezana ... Juana
- Daniel Martín ... Rafael
- Antonio Gades ... Mojigondo
- Antonio Prieto ... Rosendo
- José Manuel Martín ... Curro (as J. Manuel Martín)
- Margarita Lozano ... Isabel
- Juan Manuel Soriano
- Antoñita Singla ... Sole (as Antonia 'La Singla')
- Aurelio Galán 'El Estampío' ... Jero (as A. Galán 'El Estampío')
- Peret... Guitarist
- Andrés Batista ... Guitarist
- Emilio de Diego ... Guitarist
- 'Pucherete' ... Guitarist
- Blay ... Guitarist
- El Chocolate ... Cantaor
- 'La Mueque' ... Cantaor
- 'Morita' ... Cantaor (as 'Morità')
- Enrique Cádiz ... Cantaor
- 'El Viti' ... Cantaor
- J. Toledo ... Cantaor
- Antonio Escudero 'El Gato' ... Juan/Bailaor (as A. Escudero 'El Gato')
- D. Bargas ... Bailaor (as D. Bargas 'Lulula')
- Amapola ... Antonia/Bailaora
- 'El Guisa' ... Bailaor
- Antonio Lavilla ... Sancho
- Francisco Batista
- Carlos Villafranca ... Salvador
- Josefina Tapias

== See also ==
- List of submissions to the 36th Academy Awards for Best Foreign Language Film
- List of Spanish submissions for the Academy Award for Best Foreign Language Film
