= Carmen Amaya =

Spanish flamenco dancer and singer (1918–1963)

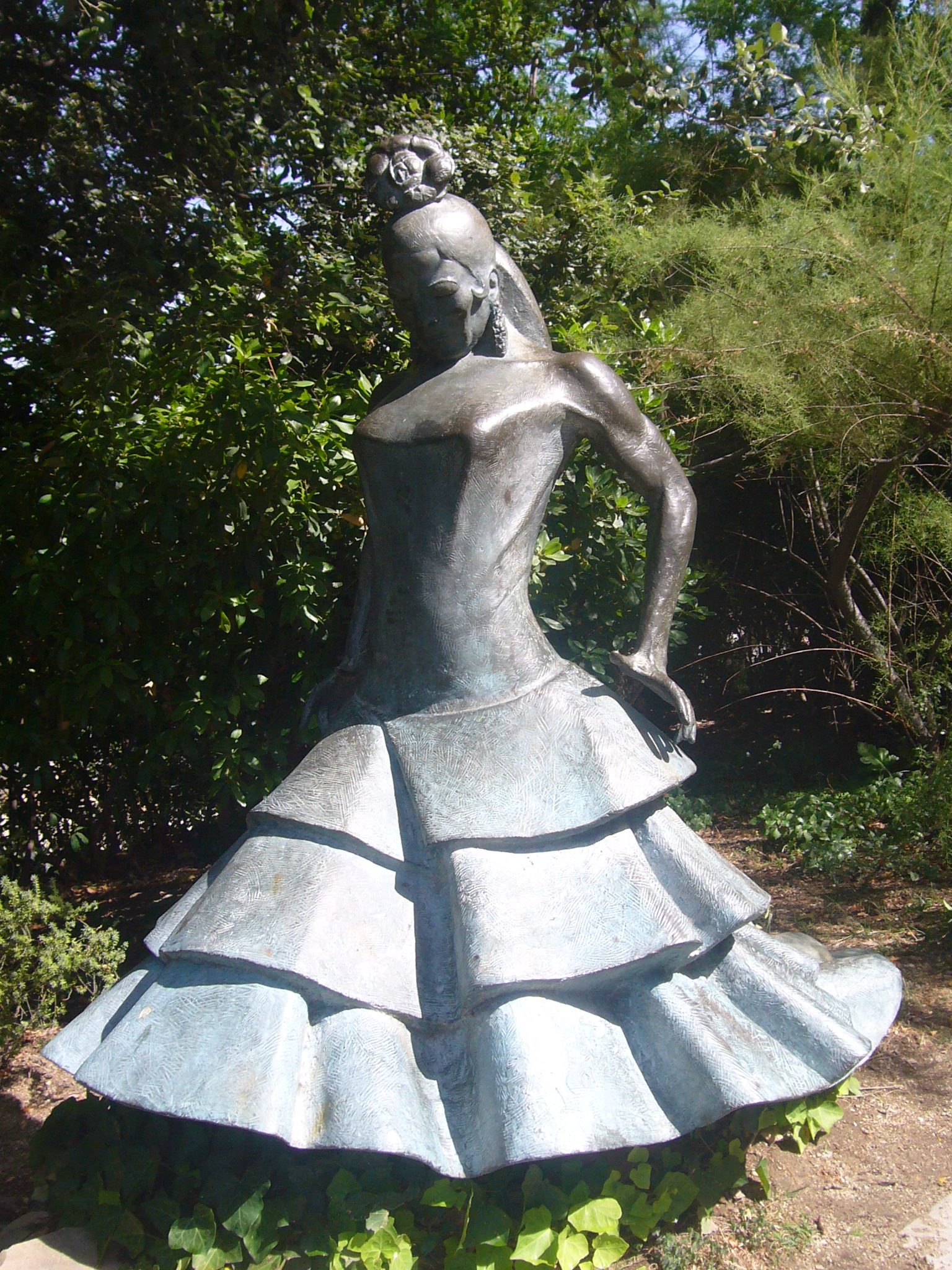
- Posthumous monument to Carmen Amaya in Barcelona
- Born: Carmen Amaya Amaya; November 2, 1918; Somorrostro, Barcelona, Catalonia, Spain
- Died: November 19, 1963 (aged 45); Begur, Girona, Spain
- Resting place: Cemetery of Ciriego, Santander, Spain
- Other name: La Capitana
- Occupations: Flamenco dancer; Singer; Actress
- Years active: 1924–1963
- Notable work: Los Tarantos; Juan Simón's Daughter; Maria de la O
- Spouse: Juan Antonio Agüero González (m. 1952)
- Relatives: La Chunga (cousin); Remedios Amaya (cousin); Chato Amaya (cousin); La Chunguita (cousin)
- Awards: Medal of Merit of Tourism (Barcelona); Lazo of the Order of Isabella the Catholic; Adoptive Daughter of Begur; Monument at Montjuïc (Barcelona); Fountain in Somorrostro

Carmen Amaya Amaya (2 November 1918 – 19 November 1963), nicknamed La Capitana (English: The Captain) was a Spanish Romani flamenco dancer and singer, born in the Somorrostro district of Barcelona, Catalonia, Spain.

She is often hailed as "the greatest Flamenco dancer ever" and "the most extraordinary personality of all time in flamenco dance." She was the first female flamenco dancer to master footwork previously reserved for the best male dancers, due to its speed and intensity. She sometimes danced in high-waisted trousers as a symbol of her strong character.

== Biography ==
Carmen Amaya Amaya was born in Somorrostro, Spain, to a Romani family, her father José Amaya Amaya (alias "El Chino", "The Chinaman"), a guitar player, and Micaela Amaya Moreno, her mother. Carmen was the second of eleven children, although only six (three sisters and two brothers) survived to adulthood. She was also the cousin of famed flamenco dancers Chato Amaya, Remedios Amaya, La Chunga, and La Chunguita.

Her date of birth is disputed. Montse Madridejos and David Pérez Merinero name 1918 as her year of birth. They cite Barcelona's inhabitants list of 1930, in which a family Amalla with a 12-year-old daughter Carmen is mentioned. They claim that no birth document is available and the document of baptism was lost due to a church fire. Furthermore, a 1920 oil painting by Julio Moisés named Maternidad shows a mother with a 2-3 year old girl, supposed to be Carmen with her mother Micaela. According to them, photographs showing Carmen Amaya as a teenager also support 1918 as the year of birth. According to Montse Madridejos, professor of Music History at the University of Barcelona and a flamenco history researcher, who specializes in Carmen Amaya, her ethnicity could have also been a factor in the birth date ambiguity: "At that time, a gypsy was neither baptized, nor registered".

In 2023, the researcher Montse Madridejos published an academic article in the journal Sinfonía Virtual in which she underscores and gives more weight to 1918 as the possible year of birth of Carmen Amaya.

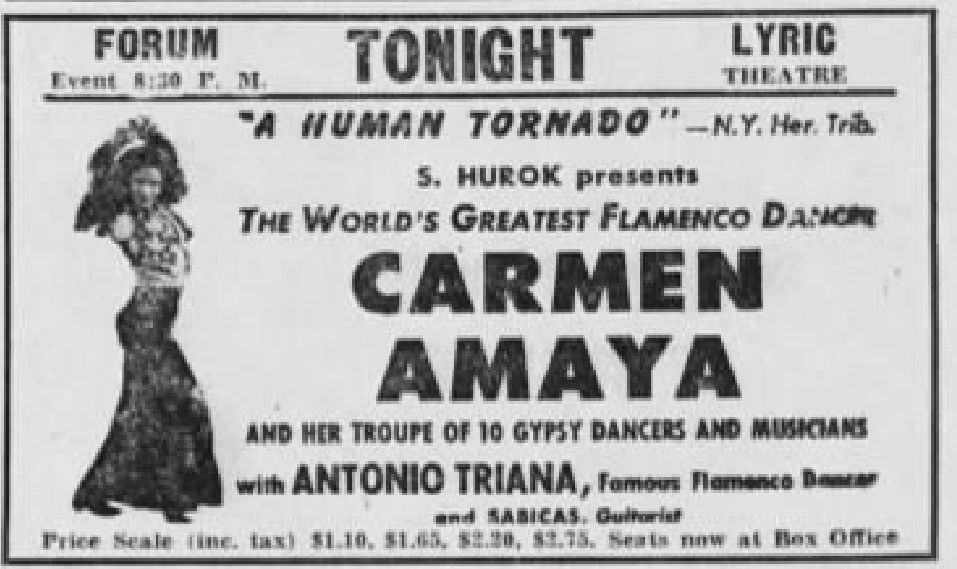
1942 newspaper advertisement

Amaya entered the flamenco world accompanied by her father, an impoverished Calé Romani guitarist who made a living by playing in pubs day and night. When Carmen was a child, she started going out with her father at night. He accompanied her on the guitar while she performed. Afterwards, they begged and picked the small change that the public threw on the floor. Soon earned her first nickname, "La Capitana".

At the same time, she started to appear in some lesser known theaters. It was only after Josep Santpere, a bright variety show businessman, showed for the first time his interest in Carmen and introduced her to more prestigious venues, that she made her debut at the Spanish Theatre in Barcelona. Soon after, she was performing at the Palace Theatre in Paris.

The first time she appeared in print was in 1931 thanks to Sebastià Gasch, an art critic who saw her and wrote an article in the weekly newspaper Mirador. Sebastian Gash wrote:

"Suddenly a jump! And the gypsy girl danced. Indescribable. Soul. Pure Soul. Feeling made flesh. The floorboards vibrated with unprecedented brutality and incredible precision. La Capitana was a gross product of Nature. Like all gypsies, She must have been born dancing. It was before school, before the academy. All that she knows, She must have known from birth. Promptly, the viewer feels subjugated, upset, dominated by the face of La Capitana, by her fierce hip movements, by the bravery of her pirouettes and the force of her broken turns, whose animal ardor ran parallel with the astonishing accuracy with which she executed them. The raging battery of her heels and the unsteady play of her arms now aroused, excited, then collapsing, surrendered, abandoned, dead, gently moved by the shoulders, are still recorded in our memories like indelible plaques. what caused us to look at her dance was her nerve, which twisted her in dramatic contortions, her blood, her violence, her wild impetuosity as a caste dancer."

At this point Vicente Escudero, a respected businessman, saw her dancing and concluded that Carmen would bring about a flamenco revolution thanks to her perfect synthesis of two important styles: that of the traditional dancers, and the emerging style of dancers in the variety shows.

In 1930, she was part of the Manuel Vallejo company, performing all over Spain. On her return to Barcelona she danced at the Teatro Español, recommended by José Cepero.

That year she worked in the Zarzuela Theatre, also known as the Coliseum, in Madrid with Conchita Piquer, Miguel de Molina, and other famous artists, and at the Fontalba Theatre. That was the authentic success of Carmen nationwide. She played a small role in La hija de Juan Simón and Maria de la O, and worked for a musical magazine in Barcelona. From her first performance" in 1935 to her last one in "Los Tarantos", her dancing showcases the purest form of flamenco. The films she starred in are very few films have been created around one figure. They are also a model for dancers who define their dance as being "of temperament". Very seldom in the history of New York have dance and flamenco been as successful as Carmen Amaya's performances.

Juan Carceller hired her for a tour. She travelled to several big cities, including San Sebastián. In 1935, Luisita Esteo presented her in Madrid, in a show at the Coliseum. On 18 July 1936, when the coup in Spain took place, Carmen and her team were in the Zorrilla Theatre in Valladolid, working for Carcellé's company. At that time, they were financially secure and she had bought her first car. They were due to go to Lisbon to sign the lease, but the car was requisitioned and they could not travel to Portugal until November.

=== Beginning of international success: Latin America (1936–1940) ===
In 1936, when the Spanish Civil War had just begun, Carmen Amaya and her troupe were on tour in Valladolid with Luisita Esteso's show. They crossed the border from Spain to Portugal and, after a short time arrived in Lisbon. From there they sailed for Buenos Aires on the ship Monte Pascoal, which took fifteen days to cross the Atlantic and arrive at Brazil and Uruguay. She debuted in Buenos Aires, accompanied by Ramón Montoya and Sabicas at the Maravillas Theatre.

During this stage of her life, she added to her artistic group several members of her family. She made films in Buenos Aires with Miguel de Molina and won the admiration of musicians Arturo Toscanini and Leopold Stokowski, who publicly praised her.

The success of Carmen Amaya and her family exceeded all expectations. They planned to stay for only four weeks but ended up staying there for nine months, since every time Carmen performed, the theater was filled and tickets were sold out two months in advance. A good example of the enormous popularity that the artist achieved in this South American country is the construction of a theater that bears her name: el Teatro Amaya.

In addition, it seems that during most of those years in America the bailaora maintained a personal relationship with Sabicas, who declared shortly before his death that he and Carmen had been dating for nine years, and that they had split in Mexico.

=== Consolidation in the United States (1941–1947) ===
In the US, Carmen Amaya met many of the most influential people of her time. She went several times to Hollywood to film some movies and the most important personalities of cinema, music or culture wanted to see her dance. The musician Toscanini saw one of her performances once and declared that he had never seen an artist with more rhythm and more fire. She improvised continuously, as quickly as perfectly.

She traveled to New York in 1941 and performed at Carnegie Hall with Sabicas and Antonio de Triana. Whilst in the United States, she also met Franklin Roosevelt, President of the United States. It was reported that after seeing her, Roosevelt gave her a bowling jacket with brilliants and invited her to dance at the White House. She returned to Europe where she performed at the Théâtre des Champs-Élysées in Paris and later in London, where she got to meet the Queen of the United Kingdom.

=== Return to Spain ===
When Carmen Amaya went back to Spain in 1947, she had gained international recognition due to her tours in America. In this era, what made her performance style unique and creative was the way she performed her flamenco dance. Apart from her choreography, another feature which made her famous at that time was her personality and behavior pattern.

She was a great success at the London Princess Theatre in 1948, and also on her next American tour. She toured Argentina again in 1950.

She returned to dance in Spain the following year, performing at the Tivoli theatro in Barcelona after several performances in Rome. She continued her work in Madrid, Paris, London, and different cities in Germany, Italy, and the rest of Europe. The Queen of England congratulated her when she performed there; Carmen Amaya and Elizabeth II appeared together in a newspaper photograph entitled: "Two queens face to face."

In 1951, she married guitarist Juan Antonio Agüero, a member of her troupe, coming from a distinguished family from Santander, who was not Romani. They lived an authentic love story and celebrated an intimate wedding. In 1959, Carmen experienced one of the most exciting moments of her life, when the inauguration ceremony of a fountain bearing her name was held. The fountain was placed on the Paseo Marítimo de Barcelona, which crosses the neighbourhood of Somorrostro, the same places where she had walked by many years before as a child, barefoot and dragging her misery.

In subsequent years she continued her work in northern Europe, France, Spain, the United States, Mexico and South America. She triumphed at the Westminster Theatre in London and at La Zarzuela theatre in Madrid in 1959. At that time, Barcelona paid tribute to Carmen Amaya by building the Carmen Fountain in the artist's old home district, Somorrostro, to popular acclaim.

She recorded her last film, Los Tarantos, by Rovira-Beleta in 1963, and afterwards continued working. At the end her illness, a kind of renal impairment that impeded her properly eliminating the toxins that her body accumulated, prevented her from continuing in Gandía.

Her illness was exacerbated by the filming of her latest film, Los Tarantos, directed by Rovira-Beleta (1963). Carmen overcame her health issues and at the end of filming started a summer tour. The last time she performed in Madrid, she was already terminally ill. Finally, her illness stopped her from performing. The doctors could not find a suitable treatment. She danced for the last time in Malaga. On 8 August 1963, whilst she was working in Gandía, Carmen interrupted her performance. She was dancing when suddenly she said to Batista: "Andrés, we finished."

=== Death ===
Carmen Amaya died of kidney disease in Begur, Girona, Catalonia, northeast Spain, in 1963 and is buried at the Cemetery of Ciriego in Santander.

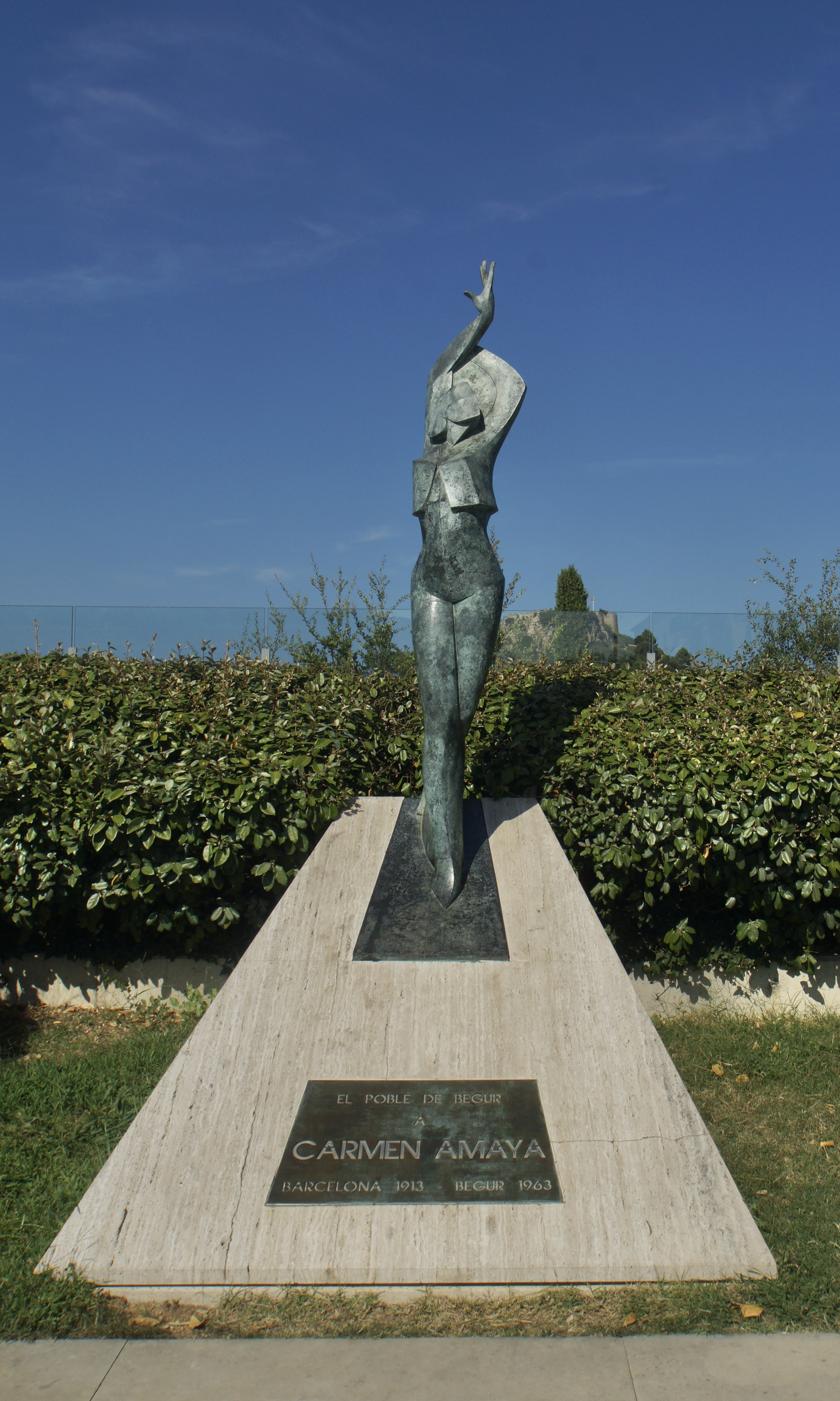
Posthumous monument erected in honor of Carmen Amaya. Located in Begur, Spain.

She was awarded the Medal of Merit of Tourism in Barcelona, the Lasso of the Lady of the Order of Isabel la Católica award, and given the title of Adoptive Daughter of Begur.

Three years after her death (1966) she was honored by a monument placed in the Amusement Park of Montjuic. Buenos Aires has a street named after her. In Madrid in the "Tablao" Los Califas, she was honored by a tribute performance in which many artists participated, including Lucero Tena, Mariquilla, and Felix de Utrera.

In 1988, as an homage to Carmen Amaya, the Tablao de Carmen was founded in the Poble Espanyol, the very place where she danced for the King of Spain Alfonso XIII during the inauguration of the 1929 Barcelona International Exposition. Tablao de Carmen displays some of the photographic legacy of Carmen Amaya. The guitar of her husband Juan Antonio Agüero (by Santos Hernández 1930) is a part of the patrimony of the founder family of Tablao de Carmen and it is played in the Tablao on special occasions.

=== Medals and recognition awards ===
Her death was a great loss for the entire Flamenco world. She was awarded with the Medalla del Mérito Turístico de Barcelona, Lazo de Isabel la Católica and the title of Hija Adoptiva de Bagur. Her funeral summoned a large number of Roma People from different parts of Spain and even France.

Amaya died in Bagur, where she spent her last days, her remains rest in the crypt of her husband's family, in Santander. Three years after her death in 1966, the statues of her were erected in the Parque de Montjuic in Barcelona, and in Buenos Aires, while in Madrid, in Tablao Los Califas, a tribute, led by Lucero Tena, among other artists, took place. She was also honored in Llafranch (Girona) in 1970.

The personality of Carmen Amaya has been celebrated by critics, flamencologists and writers, as well as by poets, including Fernando Quiñones, author of the poem Soneto y letras en vivo para Car men Amaya. A selected transcription of these comments by Vicente Marrero, reads: Carmen Amaya can see the amazing conviction that sometimes tends to dance. "Gitanilla" ungainly, skinny, petite, almost disembodied. Brunette, with a tragic and remote idol face, Asian cheekbones, with long eyes full of omens, twisted arms. With her "repajolera" gypsy [Romani] grace, she is not just another millionaire in North America, but one of our great dancers, who has succeeded, with the secret of dance and her dance she was born to dance, and she danced phenomenally. Carmen Amaya, is her name, is not a different woman in each of her dances, as so often happens with other great dance figures.

The performance technique of Amaya was often described by contemporaries in reviews, emphasizing her strong stage presence and distinctive physical technique. Her expressive body movements and Romani background were often mentioned in reviews as the main features of her art. During her years of activity in North America, Amaya gained a considerable financial success and became a well-known personality of the flamenco dance.

Carmen's flamenco legacy is still valid to this day as an example of dancing with force, meter, intensity and power and a way of expression which brought an end to the sweetness of flamenco which had endured until that point. The famous producer Sol Hurok described Carmen as "The Human Vesuvius." Carmen Amaya has been the incarnation of the flamenco dance par excellence. She has danced in numerous films.

On 2 November 2023, Google celebrated her 110th birthday with a Google Doodle.

== Selected filmography ==
- 1929 - La bodega (Wine Cellars)
- 1934 - 2 mujeres y 1 Don Juan
- 1935 - La hija de Juan Simón
- 1935 - Don Viudo de Rodríguez
- 1936 - María de la O
- 1939 - Embrujo del Fandango (Cuba)
- 1941 - Original Gypsy dances
- 1942 - Aires de Andalucía
- 1942 - Panama Hattie
- 1944 - Knickerbocker Holiday (Pierna de Plata)
- 1944 - Follow the Boys (Sueños de Gloria)
- 1945 - Los amores de un torero (México)
- 1945 - See My Lawyer (Entiéndase con mi abogado)
- 1953 - When Do You Commit Suicide? (1953 film)
- 1954 - Dringue, Castrito y la lámpara de Aladino
- 1955 - Música en la Noche
- 1963 - Los Tarantos
