= Francisco Guerrero (character) =

Secret identity of comic book superhero El Gato Negro

El Gato Negro
- Francisco as El Gato Negro. Art by Richard Dominguez

Publication information
- Publisher: Azteca Productions
- First appearance: El Gato Negro #1 (1993)
- Created by: Richard Dominguez

In-story information
- Alter ego: Francisco "Pancho" Guerrero
- Team affiliations: Team Tejas
- Notable aliases: The Nocturnal Warrior
- Abilities: Expert in Ninjitsu, Expert in Taijitsu, Highly trained luchador, Boxing, Highly trained weapons expert, Access to high tech equipment, Master detective

Francisco "Pancho" Guerrero Jr., also known as El Gato Negro, is a fictional character and comic book superhero created by Richard Dominguez and published by Azteca Productions. The character made his first appearance in El Gato Negro #1 (October 1993).

Grandson of the original El Gato Negro, a former luchador-turned-adventurer, Francisco works as a social worker in Edinburg, Texas and devotes most of his free time to community service. Driven by the gruesome murder of his best friend at the hands of drug-smugglers, Francisco becomes the new El Gato Negro in order to wage war on crime. Unlike most superheroes, he possesses no superpowers and instead makes use of his own athletic abilities, accumulative knowledge, detective skills to fight crime. Operating throughout Lower Rio Grande Valley, he is assisted by several supporting characters including his grandfather Agustin Guerrero and weapons-mechanic expert Antonio Trujillo, and fights an assortment of villains ranging from common criminals to outlandish supervillains. Despite being popular with the citizens of his community, El Gato Negro is constantly being hunted by local law enforcement and sensationalized as a menace to society by the media. El Gato Negro is known to perform his vigilante activities under the cover of darkness, earning him the nickname The Nocturnal Warrior, a term which first appeared in within the comics in El Gato Negro #3 (Nov. 1995).

The character's debut series was met with critical success but lasted only four issues. After a seven-year hiatus, El Gato Negro later returned to be published in a new second series entitled, "El Gato Negro: Nocturnal Warrior". El Gato Negro's popularity has landed him guest-starring roles in several publications and other media including being featured in Mountain Dew's "Do the Dew" Tour. Dominguez is currently in-talks for a possible live-action film adaption based on the character.

== Publication history ==
=== Creation and conception ===
El Gato Negro was conceived by Richard Dominguez sometime in the mid-to-late '80s and was originally intended to debut in a largely Mexican-American or Latino superhero group called Team Tejas. Dominguez later placed Team Tejas on hold to focus on the development of the El Gato Negro character, as he recalls:

El Gato Negro was created or "born" when I was sketching on my notebook paper and in binders during (when I was supposed to be taking notes) classes in a community college...He was originally supposed to be a member of an all-Hispanic superhero group which I called "Team Tejas". I later became partial this particular character and put my emphasis on him and put the rest of the team in the "backburner".

The name "El Gato Negro" originated from an abandoned settlement by the name of "El Gato", which was located south of Pharr, Texas. Dominguez would later devise the character's secret identity, Francisco Guerrero, to have direct ties to the Mexican Revolution. The character's given name came from Mexican revolutionary Francisco "Pancho" Villa, while the surname Guerrero was mainly chosen for its English-translation "warrior", although Dominguez has hinted at a more historical significance:

I haven't made up the entire story yet, I haven't actually told this story yet, so I don't have the details, but El Gato has a history all the way to the Mexican Revolution through his great-grandfather.

El Gato Negro would become grounded in Mexican and Tejano folklore and popular culture, including a large influence from the Mexican wrestling traditions, like the wrestling style called lucha libre. Various aspects of the character's personality and visual design were directly inspired by some of Dominguez's favorite comic book superheroes including The Spirit, The Crimson Avenger, Daredevil, Nightwing and most noticeably Batman. He also drew inspiration from Walter B. Gibson's The Shadow and Johnston McCulley's Zorro, as well as Lee Falk's comic strip The Phantom. Elements from Japanese animation, manga, and martial arts films also aided in the development of El Gato Negro's costume design and equipment. The example of Judge Margarito Garza's Relampago character helped Dominguez pursue his creation in a self-published format.

=== Publication ===
El Gato Negro made his debut in El Gato Negro #1 (October 1993). Cover art by Dave Kramer.

Francisco Guerrero made his first published appearance in El Gato Negro #1 written and illustrated by Dominguez in 1993. The first three-part story-arc "Unknown passing, Unforgettable Return" introduced El Graduado, a notorious villain intent on making a large drug-trafficking deal in South Texas in order to gain a seat with the criminal organization known as The Annulus. El Graduado's best efforts are consistently thwarted by El Gato Negro until a final confrontation in which the criminal is apprehended and last seen awaiting trial. The debut series proved popular, and a fourth issue soon followed featuring a subplot involving Judge Garza's Relampago character, his first appearance in print after nearly fifteen years. The fourth issue titled "Enter: The Dogs of War!" occurs just weeks after the events of the first story-arc. The issue involved two hired mercenaries intent on killing El Gato Negro. Francisco, exhausted from his vigilante activities, barely survived his first encounter with the deadly duo, which resulted in near inter-cranial injury. A fifth issue tentatively titled "And Now...Relampago" was due for release, but the comic was put on hiatus ending the last issue with a cliffhanger. There are currently plans to release a trade-paperback compilation featuring of the original series which will include the unpublished issue, thereby resolving the storyline.

El Gato Negro returned in 2004 under the new series "El Gato Negro: Nocturnal Warrior" after a seven-year hiatus. Dominguez enlisted the aid of Michael S. Moore to serve as writer and co-plotter of the new series (having previously worked together on the first published issue of Team Tejas) and artist Efren Molina. The combination of Moore's writing style and Molina's pencils have given the new series a much darker tone than its predecessor, to which Dominguez explains:

I felt that I didn't do justice to true [El Gato Negro] fans who really deserve a book that is worthwhile reading about a Hispanic superhero. I'm relaunching the series with the services of writer Michael Moore (who is part Latino), who I believe truly understands the essence of the community...I'm really excited about Efren Molina's pencils...[His] pencils give a darker atmosphere for the book. It pulls the 'the true-blue-Gato fans' right into the story.

The new four-part "Legacy" storyline will retell the history of El Gato Negro and introduces a new villain in his ever-increasing rogues gallery, a blind assassin, known as El Observador.

== Fictional character history ==
In El Gato Negro's first appearance in El Gato Negro #1, he is already an established crime-fighter. According to his origin story, Francisco was raised by his grandfather, Agustin Guerrero, his parents having died in a traffic collision. Francisco studied diligently in school, eventually graduating from South Texas College with a major in sociology, a minor in psychology and earned a master's degree in political science. After completing his education, Francisco decided to look after his grandfather and became a prominent social worker in Edinburg, Texas. Francisco adopted the moniker of El Gato Negro shortly after the death of his childhood friend Mario Bustamonte, a border patrol officer who was overpowered and murdered by several drug-runners. During the months Francisco operated as El Gato Negro, he instantly became popular with the citizens of the Lower Rio Grande Valley. However, the media began vilifying his vigilante activities and to make matters worse El Gato Negro is constantly pursued by police Captain Miguel Bustamone, Francisco's friend and Mario's older brother.

In the first El Gato Negro storyline "Unknown Passing, Unforgettable Return" #1-3, Francisco encountered Armando Ochoa, better known in the criminal underworld as "El Graduado". Being the son of the successful businessman and drug lord Ignacio Ochoa, El Graduado planned to take his father's place amongst a criminal organization known as The Annulus, which makes a yearly summit in South America. In order to impress the Annulus, El Graduado was to make a large drug-trafficking deal in Texas.

After being consistently thwarted by the hero, El Graduado kidnapped his former girlfriend Narcilina Montoya and Francisco's grandfather. Holding both of them at Guerrero's Produce, El Graduado offered Agustin him the position as a silent partner in his drug trade. After refusing to help him, Agustin is taken outside to be executed. Francisco frantically rushes to the Guerrero's Produce building and is surprised to find his grandfather in his old El Gato Negro costume. With their efforts along with the aid of the Texas rangers, they are able to subdue the villain El Graduado. El Gato Negro finally earned the respect of Miguel Bustamonte, but he continues to hunt the hero regardless, believing his purposes to be noble, but his methods dangerous.

In 1997's "Enter: The Dogs of War!" storyline from El Gato Negro #4 Francisco suffered his greatest defeat at the hands of the Briones Brothers. As El Gato Negro, Francisco is shown to have become overconfident in his abilities and spending more sleepless nights watching over the valley. In revenge for the incarceration of El Graduado, Boss Ochoa enlisted the aid of his nephews, known as The Dogs of War to assassinate the Nocturnal Warrior. Francisco's overwhelming fatigue slowed him in their battle and he was nearly beaten to death. Despite suffering from near inter-cranial injury, he managed to drag himself home, where he collapsed in the arms of his grandfather.

In the ongoing "Legacy" storyline from "El Gato Negro: Nocturnal Warrior" #1-4, El Graduado has been released from police custody and is enlisting rival mob bosses and street gangs to join his crime family in order to become the main drug supplier for the Annulus. Those who disagree are slaughtered by the blind mercenary and assassin El Observador, who is currently under the payroll of the Ochoa crime family.

== Personality and characterization ==
El Gato Negro's personality can be characterized by his prowess in combat, highly skilled deductive abilities, a highly instilled sense of idealism and strict moral code. Adopting the persona of a Black Cat, the hero is loosely associated with superstition, bringing bad luck to those who would do evil. He uses darkness to evoke a strong psychological impact among the guilty, often taunting them while he hides in the shadows unseen. El Gato Negro uses any force necessary to apprehend criminals but never so far as to kill them.

=== Francisco Guerrero ===
In his secret identity, El Gato Negro is Francisco Guerrero, known for his generous charity and willingness to go out of his way to help others. He is also Catholic, who believes in aiding his community. Francisco carries the mantle of El Gato Negro as a heavy burden, one which robs him of his social life. According to El Gato Negro #1, Francisco gets "This queasy feeling in my gut when I do these 'deed's...but I get an awfully bad one if I don't do anything about it!" He often ponders whether or not his existence as El Gato Negro is a sin of pride or genuine necessity and has, on occasion, snuck into his local church confessional to talk with the padre.

== Skills, abilities and resources ==
Unlike the average comic book superhero, El Gato Negro has no superpowers or abilities out of the normal human spectrum. Instead he makes use of his extensive training in martial arts, professional wrestling, tactical weaponry and is assisted by several supporting characters, including his grandfather. While the original El Gato Negro relied more heavily on his fighting ability, Francisco's incarnation of El Gato Negro has a wide-variety of technology to choose from.

=== Costume and equipment ===
Detail of El Gato Negro's mask from El Gato Negro #1. Art by Richard Dominguez.

Francisco's suit design differs significantly from that of his grandfather's, which was more typical for the Mexican wrestling traditions. His entire suit is made of a breatheable material described as "similar to biker's shorts", the nose and cat-like ears of his mask being reinforced with synthetic leather. The ears of the headpiece also serve to amplify the slightest sound and are able to retain their cup-shape despite being folded or bent. Inside each one of the ears is a battery compartment that powers the mask's lenses, modified from night vision goggles. The suit was designed by Francisco and his friend Antonio Trujillo.

El Gato's weapon of choice is the shuriken or "Flying Cat's Claw". The shurikens are made of steel and are no bigger than 2½" by 3/32", each one having 8 sharp barbs with a chisel-like tip. Francisco's suit can conceal a total of 8 Cat Claws in special compartments in his boots and gloves. El Gato will only use the Flying Cat Claws if he or someone else is in immediate danger. These modified shurikens were designed by both Francisco and James Takayuki. Other weapons in El Gato Negro's arsenal include two stylized batons which secretly adhere to the back of his costume.

=== The Gatocycle ===
A heavily modified motorcycle constructed by Antonio Trujillo. The Gatocycle has a four stroke, four cylinder engine with twin over-head camshaft and 4 mikuni 40 SS Carburettors, with a max power of 156 HP at 10,000 RPM and max torque of 12Kgm at 9,000 RPM. The vehicle was wrecked shortly after its introduction while El Gato Negro was in a high-speed pursuit, and later Antonio Trujillo begrudgingly reconstructed it.

== Supporting characters ==
Much of El Gato Negro's character is defined by the supporting characters that surround him as well as their interactions between each other. The most important supporting role in the El Gato Negro mythos is filled by Agustin Guerrero. The few characters who know of El Gato Negro's secret identity include mechanic Antonio Trujillo and martial artist James Takayuki, both of whom supply the hero with equipment. Other supporting characters include Miguel Bustamonte, a recurring character since his first introduction, and pool shark informant Enrique “Rata” Armendariz. Narcilina Montoya is a recurring love interest, although Francisco's activities as El Gato Negro often prevent him from pursuing a more meaningful relationship.

El Gato Negro is known to join forces with fellow superheroes in order to reach a shared goal. He is close friends with the hero Relampago and an ally of Team Tejas, despite his refusal to join the government-funded group. El Gato Negro has also been known to team-up with the anti-hero known as L-7, despite their differing views on vigilante justice. He has often been paired up with characters outside of the Azteca Productions' universe, such as Hector Cantú and Carlos Castellanos' Baldo as well as guest-starring in David Álvarez's Yenny, although these are usually deemed non-continuity storylines.

=== Enemies ===
El Gato Negro's enemies vary from common thugs to outlandish supervillains, some of which have tragic origin stories leading them to a life of crime, while others are simply fueled by their own greed, lust for power, or desire to cause as much chaos as possible. Recurring antagonists include El Graduado, The Dogs of War, Boss Ochoa, El Observador, Dirge, Spring-Heeled Jack, Graveyard, The Anaconda, and Autoheist.

== In other media ==
=== Film adaptation ===
As of January 2016, Richard Dominguez was currently working with writer-turned-director Michael S. Moore in directing and filming a live-action short-film adaptation titled El Gato Negro: Prey.

=== Television adaptation ===
In February 2019, Deadline Hollywood reported that MGM Television is developing an El Gato Negro television series, with Diego Boneta starring and executive producing the series through his production company Three Amigos, and with Joel Novoa co-executive producing. In September 2019, Robert Rodriguez joined the project to direct and executive produce, with the series originally set to be on Apple TV+.

In February 2024, Amazon Prime Video (which owns MGM) greenlit the series, now titled El Gato, for production in the spring of 2024.

== See also ==
- Agustin Guerrero (comics)
