= El Gato (TV series) =

Upcoming American superhero television series

- Genre: Superhero; Action; Adventure; Science fiction
- Created by: Eric Carrasco
- Based on: El Gato Negro by Richard Dominguez
- Written by: Eric Carrasco
- Starring: Diego Boneta; Sarah Jones; Lorenza Izzo; Eric Lange; Alfonso Dosal; Angela Sarafyan; Adriana Barraza
- Composer: toydrum
- Countries of origin: United States; Mexico
- Original languages: English; Spanish

Production
- Executive producers: Eric Carrasco; Turi Meyer; Alfredo Septién; Mark Burnett; Diego Boneta; Steve Stark; Kai Dolbashian; Joel Novoa-Schneider; Marilú G. Carranza
- Production locations: Mexico City, Mexico; Austin, Texas, U.S.
- Production companies: MGM Television; Azteca Productions; Three Amigos Productions; Toluca Pictures; 1.21 Films

Original release
- Network: Amazon Prime Video

El Gato is an upcoming American superhero television series created by Eric Carrasco and based on the comic series El Gato Negro, created in 1993 by Richard Dominguez. The show stars Diego Boneta as El Gato Negro, with Sarah Jones, Lorenza Izzo, Eric Lange, Angela Sarafyan, Alfonso Dosal and Adriana Barraza as supporting characters.

The series is produced by MGM Television and is set to be distributed by Amazon Prime Video.

== Cast ==
- Diego Boneta as Francisco "Frank" Guerrero / El Gato Negro; son of a former vigilante who must take on the mantle of hero and navigate a sea of crime and family secrets.
- Sarah Jones as Ashley; a CIA field agent who works as Frank's manager, who seeks to dismantle an undercover red criminal
- Eric Lange as Simon Casimir / The Nazarite; reformed criminal and monk possessed of superhuman strength
- Lorenza Izzo as Rosa; a stranger to the world of wealth into which she has married, and the first to recognize the sharks that surround her family
- Adriana Barraza as Alma; widow of Frank's father and who helps him on his missions. In the 1970s, she discovered that her husband was the masked vigilante known as "El Gato Negro"
- Alfonso Dosal as Alejandro "Alex" Guerrero; a cruel Oxford executive and director of a multimillion-dollar agricultural company, he is Gabriel's ambitious nephew who was once like his brother
- Angela Sarafyan as Elisa Kazanjian; A cold former CIA agent with a traumatic past. She works in Mexico City investigating the criminal past of agricultural billionaire Gabriel Guerrero

== Production ==
=== Development ===
In February 2019, Deadline Hollywood reported that MGM Television is developing a El Gato Negro television series, with Mexican actor Diego Boneta starring and executive producing the series through his production company Three Amigos, and with Joel Novoa as co-executive producer. In September 2019, Robert Rodriguez joined the project to direct and executive produce, with the series originally slated for Apple TV+. British-born entrepreneur Mark Burnett along with Americans Steve Stark, Kai Dolbashian, Joel Novoa-Schneider and Mexico's Marilú G. Carranza would serve as executive producers of the series. The creator of the original comic book, Richard Dominguez, owner of Azteca Productions, granted the rights and permissions for the use of his characters.

=== Casting ===
Actress Lorenza Izzo joined the cast in May 2024. In February 2024, Amazon Prime Video (which owns MGM) greenlit the series, now titled El Gato, to start production in spring 2024. On June 11, Sarah Jones and Adriana Barraza joined the cast as Ashley and Alma, respectively. On June 20, Eric Lange and Alfonso Dosal joined to the cast. On June 28, Angela Sarafyan joined the cast.

=== Filming ===
Principal photography began on June 24, 2024 in Mexico City, Mexico.
