= Miguel Bustamonte =

- Miguel Bustamonte, drawn in an homage to Bruce Timm. Art by Richard Dominguez.

Publication information
- Publisher: Azteca Productions
- First appearance: El Gato Negro #1 (October 1993)
- Created by: Richard Dominguez

In-story information
- Full name: Miguel Bustamonte
- Supporting character of: El Gato Negro

Miguel Bustamonte is a fictional character who appears in comic books published by Azteca Productions. Created by Richard Dominguez, the character made his first appearance in El Gato Negro #1 (October 1993). He was the first supporting character to be introduced El Gato Negro mythos and has been a recurring character since then.

== Fictional character history ==
In his first appearance, Miguel is already the police captain of the Texas Rangers division located in McAllen, Texas. His brother, Mario Bustamonte, had grown up as a childhood friend of Francisco Guerrero. Through his brother, Miguel had formed a lasting friendship with young Francisco as well. Years later, both brothers pursued careers in law enforcement, with Mario becoming a border patrolman. One night out on patrol, Mario was overpowered and murdered by illegal drug-smugglers. Devastated, Miguel vowed to bring his brother's killers to justice, while Francisco, in secret, vowed to do the same as El Gato Negro.

During the first few months of El Gato Negro's activity, Miguel believes the vigilante to be in league with the drug-smugglers. He even goes so far to theorize that El Gato Negro may have been involved in his brother's death. Driven by this possibility, Miguel pursued El Gato Negro with an almost vengeful desire. El Gato Negro later earned his respect after capturing the villain El Graduado and saving his life, but he continues to hunt the hero regardless, believing his actions to be dangerous.

In the "Legacy" storyline from El Gato Negro: Nocturnal Warrior (#1–3), Miguel reveals that his mistrust of El Gato Negro also stems from his belief that if anyone were more deserving to fulfill the legend of El Gato Negro, it would be Mario. His hunt for El Gato Negro is fueled by not wanting his brother's dream sullied by some crazed vigilante.

== In other media ==
=== Film adaptation ===
Richard Dominguez is currently in talks for a possible live-action film adaptation of El Gato Negro which may feature Miguel as a major supporting character.
