= List of Latino superheroes =

This is a list of Latino superheroes, either from Latin America or of Latin American descent.

== AAA Comics ==
- Slug (Atomix)
- Sebastian Cristea (Colentina)

== AC Comics ==
- Fawn (Starforce 6)
- Rayda (half Mexican, Femforce)

== Adelita Comic Books ==
- El Monje Negro / The Black Monk (Mexican)

== Antarctic Press ==
- La Chichona Mendoza or Chesty Mendoza, female wrestler turned superhero

== Archie Comics ==
=== Archie Comics ===
Character	Alias	Ethnicity	Classification	First appearance
Jaguar	Ralph Hardy	Peruvian	Hero	Adventures of the Jaguar #1 Menace of the Inca Serpent (September 1961)

== Azteca Productions ==
- El Gato Negro (Agustin Guerrero)
- El Gato Negro (Francisco Guerrero)
- Calibre (Team Tejas)
- Lonestarr (Team Tejas, Jonathan Gonzales)
- Reata (Team Tejas, Vanessa Castillo)
- Relampago (Marcos Zapata)

== Burrerias de Editormex ==
- Hermelinda Linda (Mexican witch, August 1965)

== Click! Comics ==
- Rattler
- Rico Chico / Rich Kid
- Santana
- Santo / Saint

== Clip Comics ==
- Mantis (Mexican superhero, January 1994)

== Dark Horse Comics ==
- Clownface
- Nick Cruz (R.I.P.D.)
- Panda

== DC Comics ==
=== DC Universe ===
Character	Alias	Ethnicity	Classification	First appearance
Acrata	Andrea Rojas	Guatemalan	Hero	Superman (vol. 2) Annual #12 (August 2000)
Aquagirl	Lorena Marquez	United States	Hero	Aquaman (vol. 6) #16 (2004)
Azucar	Veronica Lopez	Chicana (Mexican American)	Hero	Suicide Squad Most Wanted: El Diablo & Killer Croc #3 (2016)
Aztek	Unknown	Mexican	Hero	Aztek, The Ultimate Man #1 (August 1996)
El Bagual	Unknown	Argentinian	Hero	The Flash (vol. 2) Annual #13 (2000)
Bat Hombre	Unknown	Unknown	Hero	Batman #56
Big Words	Anthony Rodriguez	Unknown	Hero	Star Spangled Comics #7 (April 1942)
Black Orchid	Alba Garcia	Unknown	Hero	Justice League Dark #9 (2012)
Blue Beetle	Jaime Reyes	Chicano (Mexican American)	Hero	Infinite Crisis #3 (February 2006)
Boruka	Unknown	Costa Rican	Hero	Batman/Superman: World's Finest #21 (2023)
Bunker	Miguel Jose Barragan	Mexican	Hero	Teen Titans (vol. 4) #1 (September 2011)
Bushmaster	Bernal Rojas	Venezuelan	Hero	Super Friends #45 (June 1981)
Cachiru	Unknown	Argentinian	Hero	The Flash (vol. 2) Annual #13 (2000)
Cadejos	Andrés Aguilar	Costa Rican	Hero	Batman/Superman: World's Finest #21 (2023)
Cimarron	Unknown	Argentinian	Hero	The Flash (vol. 2) Annual #13 (2000)
El Castigo (The Whip)	Don Suarez	Mexican	Hero	The Flash (vol. 2) Annual #13 (2000)
El Castigo (The Whip)	Rodrigo Gaynor	Chicano (Mexican American)	Hero	Flash Comics #1
El Castigo (The Whip)	Shelly Gaynor	Chicana (Mexican American)	Hero	Seven Soldiers #0
Crackerjack	None	Honduran	Hero	Thriller #1 (November 1993)
El Diablo	Rafael Sandoval	Chicano (Mexican American)	Hero	El Diablo (vol. 2) #1 (August 1989)
El Diablo	Chato Santana	Chicano (Mexican American)	Hero	El Diablo (vol. 3) #1 (September 2008)
El Dorado	Eduardo	Mexican	Hero	Super Friends TV Show
El Espada (The Sword)	Billy -Bobb Rodriguez	Chicano (Mexican American)	Hero	
Empress	Anita Fite	Haitian	Hero	Young Justice #16 (2000)
Extraño	Gregorio De La Vega	Peruvian	Hero	Millennium #2 (January 1988)
Fire	Beatriz da Costa	Brazilian	Hero	Super Friends #25 (October 1979)
Firebrand	Alejandro 'Alex' Sanchez	United States	Hero	Firebrand #1 (February 1996)
El Fuego (The Fire)	Unknown	Unknown	Hero	Unknown
Gangbuster	Jose Delgado	United States	Hero	The Adventures of Superman #428 (May 1987), The Adventures of Superman #434 (November 1987)
Gaucho	Unknown	Argentinian	Hero	Detective Comics #215
Hardline	Armando Ramon	Puerto Rican	Hero	Conglomerate #1
Hawkgirl	Kendra Saunders	Cuban	Hero	Flash Comics #1 (1940)
Iman	Diego Irigoyen	Mexican	Hero	Superman (vol. 2) Annual #12 (August 2000)
Green Lantern	Kyle Rayner	American / Mexican	Hero	Green Lantern (vol. 3) #48 (1994)
Green Lantern	Jessica Cruz	Chicana (Mexican American)/Honduran	Hero	Green Lantern (vol. 5) #20 (July 2013)
El Lobizon	Unknown	Argentinian	Hero	The Flash (vol. 2) Annual #13 (2000)
Más y Menos	Unknown	Guatemalan	Hero	Teen Titans (vol. 3) #38 (September 2006)
El Muerto	Pablo Valdez	Mexican	Hero	Superman (vol. 2) Annual #12 (August 2000)
Pampero	Unknown	Argentinian	Hero	The Flash (vol. 2) Annual #13 (2000)
Pantha	Rosabelle Mendez	Unknown	Hero	The New Titans #73 (February 1991)
The Question	Renee Montoya	Dominican	Hero	52 (comics)
Rana Dorada	Unknown	Costa Rican	Hero	Batman/Superman: World's Finest #21 (2023)
Robina	Isabella Ortiz	Unknown	Hero	We are Robin #1 (June 2015)
La Salamanca	Unknown	Argentinian	Hero	The Flash (vol. 2) Annual #13 (2000)
Shazam	Pedro Peña	United States	Hero	Flashpoint #1 (May 2011)
Sideways	Derek James	Puerto Rican	Hero	Sideways Vol 1 (2018)
Flecha Verde (Green Arrows of the World)	Unknown	Mexican	Hero	Adventure Comics #250 (July 1958)
Vibe	Cisco "Paco" Ramone	Puerto Rican / Colombian	Hero	Justice League of America Annual #2 (October 1984)
Vizacacha	Unknown	Argentinian	Hero	The Flash (vol. 2) Annual #13 (2000)
Vulcan	Miguel Devante	Unknown	Hero	Son of Vulcan (vol. 2) #1 (August 2005)
Wonder Woman	Maria Mendoza	Peruvian	Hero	Just Imagine: Wonder Woman #1 (2002)
Xiuhtecutli	Unknown	Mexican	Hero	Justice League of America #235 February (1985)
Yaguarette	Unknown	Argentinian	Hero	The Flash (vol. 2) Annual #13 (2000)
Ya'Wara		Brazilian	Hero	Aquaman (vol. 7) #7 (May 2012)
Wildcat	Yolanda Montez	Mexican	Hero	Infinity, Inc. #12 (March 1985)

=== The Guardian Line ===
The Guardian Line
Character	Alias	Ethnicity	Classification	First appearance
Max	Unknown	Unknown	Hero	Joe & Max #1 (2006)

=== Hanna-Barbera ===
- Quick Draw McGraw

=== Homage Comics ===
Character	Alias	Ethnicity	Classification	First appearance
Bravo	Detective Ruiz	Unknown	Hero	Astro City
El Robo	Manuel de la Cruz	Unknown	Hero	Astro City

=== Impact Comics ===
Character	Alias	Ethnicity	Classification	First appearance
Jaguar	Maria Concepcion de Guzman	Brazilian	Hero	Impact Winter Special #1

=== Milestone Comics ===
Character	Alias	Ethnicity	Classification	First appearance
Aquamaria	Maria (last name unknown)	Unknown	Hero	Blood Syndicate #10 (January 1994)
Brickhouse	Marta (last name unknown)	Puerto Rican	Hero	Blood Syndicate #1 (January 1993)
Dusk	Unknown	Greek / Hispanic	Hero	Static #19
Fade	Carlos Quinones Jr	Dominican	Hero	Blood Syndicate
Flashback	Sara Quinones	Dominican	Hero	Blood Syndicate
Kobalt	Unknown	Cuban	Hero	Kobalt #1 (June 1993)
Manuel Dexterity		Unknown	Hero	Xombi
Manuella Dexterity		Unknown	Hero	Xombi
Mistress Mercy	Unknown	Puerto Rican	Hero	Blood Syndicate
Tech-9	Rolando Texador	Puerto Rican	Hero	Blood Syndicate
Templo	Juan Templo	Unknown	Hero	Blood Syndicate #9

=== Wildstorm ===
Character	Alias	Ethnicity	Classification	First appearance
Bloodmoon	Robert Diaz	Unknown	Hero	Team 7
Dozer	Joseph H. Mendoza	Unknown	Hero	Wetworks
Joe the Indian	Unknown	Mexican / Navajo	Hero	Crimson
Powerhaus	Hector Morales	German / Argentine	Hero	Gen13 Volume 2 #7 (1995)

== Disney Publishing Worldwide ==
Character	Alias/Identity	Ethnicity/Nationality	Hero	First appearance
Gum Girl	Gabriella "Gabby" Gomez	Mexican	Hero	The Gumazing Gum Girl! Book 1: Chews Your Destiny (2013)
Bubble Boy	Rico Gomez	Mexican	Hero	The Gumazing Gum Girl! Book 1: Chews Your Destiny (2013)
Sol Azteca	Raul Gomez	Mexican	Hero	The Gumazing Gum Girl! Book 4: Cover Blown (2019)
The Jaguares	Miguel, Alma, Lucas and Litza	Mexican	Hero	The Gumazing Gum Girl! Book 4: Cover Blown (2019)

== Ediciones Jose G.Cruz ==
- El Vampiro Tenebroso (Mexican vampire)
- Santo El Enmascarado de Plata (Mexican Wrestler, very popular due to his movies, comic books and his wrestler career)
- El Valiente (A Mexican cowboy)
- Juan sin Miedo (Another Mexican cowboy)
- Adelita (First Female Mexican hero)
- Apolo (A globetrotter crime fighter, based on a Mexican wrestler)

== Gauntlet Comics ==
- Diabla (UNForce)
- Fuego (UNForce)

== Group EsComic ==
- Aqua (Mexican, los Vigilantes del Agua / The Watchmen of the Water)
- Beto (Mexican, los Vigilantes del Agua / The Watchmen of the Water)
- Mauriman (Mexican, los Vigilantes del Agua / The Watchmen of the Water)
- Nico (Mexican, los Vigilantes del Agua / The Watchmen of the Water)
- Paolo (Mexican, los Vigilantes del Agua / The Watchmen of the Water)
- Rossana (Mexican, los Vigilantes del Agua / The Watchmen of the Water)

== Image Comics/Top Cow ==
- Avatar of Earth (Avatars of Good)
- Dusk (New Force)
- El Diablo (Freedom Force)
- Paula Ramirez of the Specials (Rising Stars)
- Tempest (Stryke Force Puerto Rican)
- Vortex (Regulators)

== JBC ==
- Kiko (Combo Rangers)
- Lisa (Combo Rangers)
- Luke (Combo Rangers)
- Tati (Combo Rangers)

== Editorial Novaro ==
- Anibal 5 (Mexican cyborg)

NOVARO COVERS

== Latinographix ==
- Diary of a Reluctant Dreamer (Undocumented Vignettes from a Pre-American Life) by Alberto Ledesma.
- Angelitos by Ilan Stavans and Santiago Cohen.
- Drawing on Anger: Portraits of U.S. Hypocrisy by Eric J. García.
- United States of Banana by Boricua Giannina Braschi and Joakim Lindengren in English (2021) on the liberation of Puerto Rico by super heroes Segismundo, Zarathustra, Hamlet, and the Puerto Rican poet Giannina. The villain is the King of the United States of Banana.
- Thunderbolt: An American Tale by WilfredSantiago (2019).
- The Adventures of Chupacabra Charlie by Frederick Luis Aldama and Chris Escobar.

== la Editoral RaCaNa ==
- Aguila Solitaria / Lone Eagle (Mexican, 1976)
- Arandu, El Principe de la Selva / Arandu, The Prince of the Forests (South American, 1970)

== Los Comex ==
- El Muerto (Real Name: Diego de la Muerte, alias El Muerto: The Aztec Zombie, Mexican-American)

== Manga Mix ==
- Cyber-Beast (Mexican, 1998)
- Destello (Mexican, 1998)
- Los Magnificos (a team of Mexican superheroes)

== Marvel Comics ==
=== Marvel Universe ===
Character	Alias	Ethnicity	Classification	First appearance
Ajak	The Legendary Inca Hero, Tecumotzin Lord of Flight	Peruvian	Hero	The Eternals #2 (August 1976)
Cuauhtli	Mexican	Hero	Marvel Westerns: Outlaw Files	
Allegra	Allegra	Unknown	Unknown	Marvel Comics Presents #150
Antonio Argent	Antonio Argent	South America	Unknown	X-Men: The 198 #1
Araña/Spider-Girl	Anya Sofia Corazon	Mexican / Puerto Rican	Hero	Amazing Fantasy (vol. 2) #1 (November 2004)
Armena Ortega		Cuban	Hero	District X #2
Auteur	Alex Flores	Unknown	Hero	Wonder Man #2
Axo	Alejande 'Alex' Luna	Unknown	Hero	Exceptional X-Men #2 (October 2024)
La Bandera	Teresa Lopez	Cuban	Hero	Wolverine (vol. 2) #19 (December 1989)
Bantam	Robert Velasquez	Puerto Rican	Hero	Captain America Annual #12
Becca the Earthgirl	Becca Rodriguez	American	Unknown	Weirdworld #5
Captain Universe	Gabriel Vargas	Chicano (Mexican American)	Hero	Amazing Fantasy (Vol. 2) #14 (October 2005)
Chango	Unknown	Unknown	Hero	Daredevil Father #2 (October 2005)
Crusher	Unknown	Cuban	Hero	Tales of Suspense #91 (July 1967)
Crusher	Juan Aponte	Unknown	Hero	Daredevil #119 (March 1975)
Darwin	Armando Munoz	African American / Hispanic	Hero	X-Men: Deadly Genesis #2
Defensor	Gabriel Carlos Dantes Sepulveda	Argentinian	Hero	Marvel Super Hero Contest of Champions #1
Egg	Fabio Medina	United States	Hero	The Uncanny X-Men (vol. 3) #1
El Condor	Unknown	Unknown	Hero	Captain America #442 (August 1995)
El Dragon	Marco	Unknown	Unknown	Young Allies #1
Eleggua	Nestor Rodriguez	Unknown	Hero	Daredevil: Father #1(April 2004)
Esteban Ortega		Cuban	Unknown	District X #2
Falcon	Joaquin Torres	Mexican	Hero	Captain America: Sam Wilson #1
Feral	Maria Callasantos	Unknown	Hero	The New Mutants #99 (March 1991)
Firebird	Bonita Juarez	Chicano (Mexican American)	Hero	The Incredible Hulk (vol. 2) #265
Flourish	Marisol Guerra	Mexican	Hero	Storm (vol. 3) #1
Ghost Rider	Roberto "Robbie" Reyes	Chicano (Mexican American)	Hero	All-New Ghost Rider #1 (March 2014)
Helix	Rafael Carago	United States	Hero	Maximum Clonage Alpha (August 1995)
HighNote	Raoul Hernandez	Colombian	Hero	Thor #300 (October 1980)
Horacio de la Fuente		Mexican	Unknown	Silver Surfer (vol. 6) #3 (June 2011)
Hummingbird	María Aracely Penalba	Mexican	Hero	Scarlet Spider (vol. 2) #1 (January 2012)
Inferno	Dante Pertuz	Colombian	Hero	Inhuman #1 - Part 1: Genesis
Ink	Eric Gitter	Unknown	Hero	Young X-Men #1
Junk	Daniel Silva	Unknown	Hero	Death of Wolverine: The Weapon X Program #1 (January 2015)
Laserfist	Raphael Suarez	Unknown	Unknown	Fantastic Four #389
Living Lightning	Miguel Santos	United States	Hero	The Avengers West Coast #63 (October 1990)
Luz Delgado		Unknown	Unknown	Ghost Rider (vol. 3) #8
Makina	Fiona Rivera	Unknown	Unknown	Spider-Man: Friends and Enemies #1 (November 1994)
Mercedes Merced		Unknown	Hero	Taskmaster (vol. 2) #1 (November 2010)
Medico Mistico	Unknown	Unknown	Hero	Avengers: The Initiative #8 (December, 2007)
Miguel Legar		Unknown	Hero	The Amazing Spider-Man #508
Miss America	America Chavez	Puerto Rican	Hero	Vengeance #1 (2011)
El Muerto	Juan-Carlos Estrada Sanchez	Mexican	Hero	Friendly Neighborhood Spider-Man #6 (May 2006)
Naja		Unknown	Hero	Inhuman #5
Nocturne	Angela Cairn	Half Cuban	Hero	The Spectacular Spider-Man #190 (July 1992)
Noise	Julio Mendoza	Mexican	Unknown	Marvel Graphic Novel: Rick Mason, The Agent (December 1989)
Nova	Sam Alexander	Mexican	Hero	Marvel Point One one-shot (October 2011)
Ojo Macabra	Candelaria Vélez	Unknown	Hero	Captain America #442 (August 1995)
Pathfinder	Nick Rodriguez	American	Hero	Alpha Flight #1 (December 1985)
Pit Bull	Unknown	Mexican	Unknown	The Incredible Hulk (vol. 3) #8
Poison	Cecilia Cardinale	Cuban	Hero	Web of Spider-Man Annual #4 (1988)
Power Man	Victor Alvarez	Afro Dominican	Hero	Shadowland: Power Man #1 (October 2010)
Rafael Vega		Puerto Rican	Hero	Wolfpack #1 (August 1988)
Red Locust	Fernanda Ramirez	Mexican	Hero	Champions #9
Reptil	Humberto Lopez	Mexican	Hero	Avengers: The Initiative Featuring Reptil #1
Cecilia Reyes		Puerto Rican	Hero	X-Men (vol. 2) #65
Rictor	Julio Esteban "Ric" Richter	Mexican	Hero	X-Factor #17 (June 1987)
Rigger	Margarita Ruiz	American	Hero	Thor #426 (September 1990)
Ripper	Unknown	Unknown	Unknown	Ghost Rider
Risque	Gloria Dolores Munoz	Half Cuban	Hero	X-Force #51
Scorn	Tanis Nieves	American	Hero	Carnage #1
Silverclaw	Maria De Guadalupe "Lupe" Santiago	Costa Verde (fictional)	Hero	The Avengers (vol. 3) #8 (September 1998)
Sister Salvation	Unknown	Unknown	Hero	Wolverine (vol. 2) #18
Skin	Angelo Espinosa	Puerto Rican	Hero	The Uncanny X-Men #317
Slingshot	Yo-Yo Rodriguez	Puerto Rican	Hero	The Mighty Avengers #13 (July 2008)
Snap	Ginger Beach	Unknown	Hero	Wonder Man #1
Spectro	Hector Cervantez	American	Unknown	Silk #1
Spider-Man	Miles Morales	Afro Puerto Rican	Hero	Ultimate Fallout #4
Spider-Man 2099	Miguel O'Hara	Chicano (Mexican American)	Hero	The Amazing Spider-Man #365
Stat / Spider	Esteban Beach	Unknown	Hero	Wonder Man #3
Sunspot	Roberto "Bobby" da Costa	Brazilian / American	Hero	Marvel Graphic Novel #4: The New Mutants
Synapse	Emily Guerrero	Unknown	Hero	The Uncanny Avengers (vol. 3) #1
Tag	Brian Cruz	Puerto Rican	Hero	The New Mutants (vol. 2) #7 (January 2004)
Taran	Spider Clan (High Priestess)	Peruvian	Hero	Peter Parker: Spiderman Annual 2001 (January 2002)
Tattoo Artist	Leon Nunez	United States	Hero	Young X-Men #1
Tempest	Angel Salvadore	Unknown	Hero	X-Force #6 (January 1992)
Thornn	Lucia Callasantos	Unknown	Hero	New X-Men #118 (2001)
Tito Bohusk		American	Hero	New X-Men #141 (May 2003)
Tores	Miguela Tores	Unknown	Unknown	Generation X #21
Toro	Benito Serrano	Colombian	Hero	Young Allies (vol. 2) #1
El Toro (Bull)	Benito Serrano	Cuban	Unknown	Tales to Astonish #54 (April 1963)
Toro Rojo (Red Bull)	Tupac Amaru	Peruvian	Hero	Thor #290 - Ring around The Red Bull (December 1979)
Truthsayer	Unknown	Unknown	Hero	Darkhold: Pages from the Book of Sins #16
Uplink	Hector Fuentes	Unknown	Unknown	Sleepwalker #7
Velocidad	Gabriel Cohuelo	Mexican	Hero	The Uncanny X-Men #527
El Vejigante	Miguel Rodriguez	Puerto Rican	Hero	Fantastic Four in...Ataque Del M.O.D.O.K.! #1
Victorious	Victor Mancha	Chicano (Mexican American)	Hero	Runaways (vol. 2) #1 (April 2005)
White Tiger	Hector Ayala	Puerto Rican	Hero	The Deadly Hands of Kung Fu #19 (December 1975)
White Tiger	Angela del Toro	Puerto Rican	Hero	Daredevil (vol. 2) #51 (November 2003)
White Tiger	Ava Ayala	Puerto Rican	Hero	Avengers Academy #20 (December 2011)
Wind Dancer	Sofia Mantega	Venezuelan	Hero	The New Mutants (vol. 2) #1 (July 2003)
Wolf	Unknown	Mexican	Hero	Captain America #269 (May 1982)
Wraith	Hector Rendoza	American	Hero	Uncanny X-Men #392 (March 2001)
Zona Rosa		Unknown	Hero	Captain America #442 (August 1995)

==== Marvel UK ====
- Pacer of the Gene Dogs
- Perez of Warheads (Mexican)
- Villarosa of Mercy Corps

EARTH-TRN521

- Arácnido (Mexican)

==== MC2 ====
- Argo the Almighty (half, son of Hercules)
- Black Tarantula (Fabian)

==== Marvel 1602 ====
- Carlos Javier, counterpart of Charles Xavier

==== Marvel 2099 ====
- Book (Mexican, X-Men)
- Breakdown (Mexican)
- Brimstone Love (Mexican)
- Captain America / Roberta Mendez
- Darkson / Joachim Eduardo Vasquez (Mexican)
- La Lunatica / Luna of the X-Men (Mexican)
- Quirk (Part Mexican)
- Rosa (Mexican)
- Spider-Man 2099 (Mexican-American)

==== New Universe ====
- Golem in the Paranormal Army
- Relampago / Lightning of Medusas Web (Chilean)

==== Ultimate Marvel ====
- Antonio Stark (Hispanic)
- Captain Spain [Carlos Fraile]
- Scorpion [Maximus Gargan], Mexican
- Spider-Man (Miles Morales) is half African-American, half-Hispanic.

=== Ultraverse/Malibu ===
- Mantra, Lukasz
- Prototype, Jimmy Ruiz

== Misión Santiago ==
- Capitan Chile (Chilean, November 2001)

== Ocean Comics ==
- Street Fighter (Puerto Rican)

== Portal Comics ==
- Apolo (Liga de los Vengadores / League of Avengers)
- Argentineman, (La Liga de Plato / The Silver League)
- Asterisco / Asterisk (Argentine)
- Atalanta (Los Universales / The Universals)
- El Avisador / Warning man (Argentine, La Liga de Plato / The Silver League)
- Bandera / Flag (Argentine, La Liga de Plato / The Silver League)
- Batería Azul / Blue Battery (Argentine, La Liga de Plato / The Silver League)
- Baudioman (Argentine, La Liga de Plato / The Silver League)
- Bicho / Bug (Argentine, La Liga de Plato / The Silver League)
- Capitán Rioplatense / Riverplate Captain (Argentine, La Liga de Plato / The Silver League)
- Chanchman / Pig man (Argentine, La Liga de Plato / The Silver League)
- Eléctrico / Electric (Argentine, La Liga de Plato / The Silver League)
- Escarlata / Scarlet (Los Universales / The Universals)
- Fábula / Fabulous (Argentine, La Liga de Plato / The Silver League)
- Fantasy (Los Universales / The Universals)
- Farmaboy (Argentine, La Liga de Plato / The Silver League)
- Hades (Liga de los Vengadores / League of Avengers)
- Helios (Liga de los Vengadores / League of Avengers)
- Hermes (Liga de los Vengadores / League of Avengers)
- Hunter (Los Universales / The Universals)
- Ínfimo (Argentine, La Liga de Plato / The Silver League)
- Lumbrí de Seda / Silk Worm (Argentine, La Liga de Plato / The Silver League)
- Poseidon (Liga de los Vengadores / League of Avengers)
- Powerman (Los Universales / The Universals)
- Rata-man / Rat-man (Argentine, La Liga de Plato / The Silver League)
- Supermarcos (Argentine, La Liga de Plato / The Silver League)
- Supremo / Supreme (Los Universales / The Universals)
- Titan (Los Universales / The Universals)
- Titania (Los Universales / The Universals)
- Vengador / Avenger (Los Universales / The Universals)

== PS238 ==
- Alejandro Torres, code-named The Flea.

== PsyComix ==
- Cerdotado (Mexican comic, anthropomorphic pig)

== Publicaciones Herrerías ==
- Alma Grande, el Yaqui Justiciero (Mexican Yaqui, July 1961)

== Rio Bravo Comics ==
- El Peso Hero (first norteño Mexican superhero, July 2011)

== Shibalba Press ==
- el Bulbo / The Bulb (Mexican comic, anthropomorphic lightbulb)

== Toukan ==
- Meteorix (Mexican superhero)

== Visual Ediciones ==
- Diablo / Devil (Chilean, Bandido imprint, 1996)

== Independents ==
- Aguila Negra / Black Eagle (Mexican cowboy)
- Aguila Roja / Red Eagle (Mexican hero)
- Amigoman – The Latin Avenger [Bilingual – USA (Span/Eng)]
- Angel Negro / Black Angel (Uruguay)
- Aqua (Mexican comic)
- Araña Verde / Green Spider (Mexican comic)
- Azor el primitivo / Azor the Primitive (Mexican Tor-like character, 1964)
- Black (Chile, Ilumina Studio)
- Borromeo (Mexican, Los Superfrios, 1960s)
- El Búho / The Owl (Mexican superhero)
- Caballero Rojo / Red Knight (from Argentina)
- Capitan Jupiter (Chilean, Space Patrol)
- Capitan Leo (Peruvian)
- Carita (Mexican, Los Superfrios, 1960s)
- Cazador (Argentine)
- Chanoc (Mexican comic created by Ángel Mora (artist) and P.Z. Fernández (writer).)
- Count (Mexican, Los Superfrios, 1960s)
- Cybersix (Argentine)
- Duck Girl (granddaughter of Xochiquetzal (Aztec goddess) and Horus; Andromeda and Bishamon)
- El Duende (Mexican superhero)
- Enigma (Mexican superhero)
- El Eternauta / Eternity Traveller (Argentine, Hora Cero Semanal)
- Finch – Duck-Girl's sufficient sidekick (South American ninja / Half-Latina; speaks Portuguese only) (Duck-Girl season 3)
- Fly Man (Argentine, Supervolador)
- Gardino (Mexican, Los Superfrios, 1960s)
- El Gavilán / The Sparrowhawk (Mexican superhero, Hombres Intrépidos presentan / Intrepid Men, 1960)
- Graviman (Argentine, Supervolador)
- Guardián invisible (Mexican superhero)
- El Chispa (Argentine)
- El Gallo (Argentine)
- El Guerrero del Antifaz created by Manuel Gago García.
- El Halcon Blanco / The White Hawk (Mexican superhero)
- El Hombre Aguila / Eagle Man (Mexican superhero)
- El Hombre Invisible / The Invisible Man (Mexican hero from the 1950s and 1960s)
- El Hombre Mosca / Man Fly (Mexican superhero, Hombres Intrépidos / Intrepid Men, April 1960)
- El Hombre de Negro / The Man in Black (Mexican superhero)
- los Invencibles (Mexican duo, Zor y los Invencibles)
- El Jinete Fantasma / The Ghost Rider (Chilean)
- Korvus (Argentine)
- la Llanera Vengadora (Mexican hero, Flor Silvestre, la Llanera Vengadora)
- Mampato (Chilean)
- La Máscara Roja / The Red Mask (Mexican superhero)
- Murciélaga She-Bat (Hispanic American, Created by Dærick Gröss)
- Murciélago / Bat (Mexican superhero)
- Ogú (caveman from ancient Chile)
- Orion (Created by Modesto Vazque R, 1981)
- El Pantera / The Panther (Mexican)
- Pantera Roja / Red Panther (Mexican)
- Patoruzú (Argentine)
- Quintin (Mexican, Los Superfrios, 1960s)
- Radius, el Hombre Increible / Radius, the Incredible Man (Mexican superhero created by V. Arzote (writer) and R.L. Gayten and A. Segura (artists), 1965)
- Relámpago, el ser increible / Lightning, the Incredible Being (1960's Mexican superhero)
- Rena (from 40th C. Chile)
- Scratchbuilt (Half Miskito, Half Central American, F.R.E.E.Lancers)
- El Señor Destino (Mexican superhero)
- Serpio (Mexican cyborg, El Camino Amarillo, November 2002)
- Sónoman (Argentine)
- Starman (Mexican superhero)
- Superhijitus (Argentine)
- Supermaya
- Supervolador / Super-flier (Argentine)
- Tawa, el hombre gacela (Mexican, Created by Joaquin Cervantes Bassoco)
- Zooman: el Hombre Mosca / Zooman: The Human Fly (Mexican superhero, 1979)
- Zor (robot, from the 1960s Mexican comic Zor y los Invencibles)

== Newspapers ==
- Paco (Los Supersabios / The Super-Wise, Novedades, Mexican newspaper strip, Created by German Butze, January 27, 1936)
- Panza (Los Supersabios / The Super-Wise, Novedades, Mexican newspaper strip, Created by German Butze, January 27, 1936)
- Pepe (Los Supersabios / The Super-Wise, Novedades, Mexican newspaper strip, Created by German Butze, January 27, 1936)
- Paladín el Cacique y Los Campeadores Boricuas (El Nuevo Día, Puerto Rico newspaper strip full-page, full-color tabloid-size Sunday comic, Written and drawn by Nick Iannone, Published from 1992–1998, paladinpr.com on the web)

== Novels ==
- El Coyote pulp-western hero created by J. Mallorquí.
- El Guerrero del Antifaz / The Soldier with the Mask created by Manuel Gago García.
- Marco from the book series Animorphs.
- United States of Banana by Giannina Braschi features the madcap adventures of Boricua Giannina, Hamlet, and Zarathustra on their mission to free Segismundo from the dungeon of the Statue of Liberty where he has been imprisoned for 100 years by his father, the villainous King of the United States of Banana. The book has also been produced as a theater play and a comic book by the same title.

== Luchadores Enmascarados ==
- Averno
- Abismo Negro / Black Abyss / Black Hole
- Blue Demon / El Demonio Azul
- Blue Panther
- Cien Caras / Hundred Faces
- Dr. Wagner, Jr.
- Fishman
- El Hijo del Santo / Santito / Son of the Saint
- Huracan Ramirez
- Mil Mascaras / Man of a Thousand Masks
- Mr. Lince
- Místico
- La Mujer Murcielago / The Batwoman
- Neutrón
- Pablo Halkyard / The Sea Bass
- La Parka
- Rey Bucanero / Buccaneer King
- Rey Misterio, Sr.
- Rey Mysterio, Jr.
- El Santo Enmascarado de Plata / Silver Masked Saint
- Silver King / Black Tiger / César Cuauhtémoc González
- Tinieblas
- Último Guerrero / The Last Warrior

== Radio ==
- Frijolito (Venezuelan)
- Martin Valiente (Venezuelan)
- el Monje Negro / The Black Monk (Mexican, 1936)
- Cisco Kid

== Television ==
- Batmanuel (from The Tick)
- Bumblebee Man (parody of El Chapulín Colorado on The Simpsons)
- El Chapulín Colorado / The Red Grasshopper (Mexican TV show)
- Dark Angel (Maxine "Max" Guevara, portrayed by Jessica Alba).
- Eduardo Dorado Jr. of Young Justice
- Isaac Mendez of Heroes
- Jade (Gargoyles)
- Kennedy of Buffy the Vampire Slayer
- Marco from the TV series Animorphs
- La Mascara Negra
- Maya Herrera of Heroes
- Molly Hernandez of Runaways
- Obsidiana (Gargoyles)
- Profesor Super O (Colombia)
- Ricky Fitness of The Aquabats! Super Show!, portrayed by Richard Falomir.
- El Tigre: The Adventures of Manny Rivera
- El Toro Fuerte from the TV series Jackie Chan Adventures
- Turquesa (Gargoyles)
- Zafiro (Gargoyles)
- Zorro / the Fox

== Video games ==
- Angel (Mexican, King of Fighters)
- Armor King (Mexican, Tekken)
- Blanka (Brazilian, Street Fighter)
- El Blaze (Mexican, Virtua Fighter 5)
- King (Mexican, Tekken)
- Lisa (Latin American, Dead or Alive)
- Ramon (Mexican, King of Fighters)
- El Stingray (Mexican, Slam Masters)
- Tizoc (Mexican, King of Fighters and Fatal Fury)
- El Fuerte (Mexican, Street Fighter)

== Film ==
- Carmen Cortez (Spy Kids franchise) / played by Alexa PenaVega
- Gregorio Cortez (Spy Kids franchise) / played by Antonio Banderas
- Juni Cortez (Spy Kids franchise) / played by Daryl Sabara
- El Coyote in La Vuelta de El Coyote (The Return of El Coyote), played by José Coronado
- Machete (played by Danny Trejo)
- Mirageman, played by Marko Zaror
- Puss in Boots / El Gato con Botas (from Shrek 2, Shrek the Third, Shrek Forever After, and Puss in Boots; anthropomorphic cat, voiced by Antonio Banderas)
- Vadinho (Aztec, mentor of Pumaman, L' Uomo puma / Pumaman, ADR Films 1980)
- Zorro / The Fox
- Zovek (Invasión de los muertos, co-starring Blue Demon)

== See also ==
- American Comic Books
- Ethnic stereotypes in comics
- List of Filipino superheroes
- List of Native American superheroes
