= Agustin Guerrero (character) =

Fictional professional wrestler

El Gato Negro
- Agustin as El Gato Negro. Art by Efren Molina.

Publication information
- Publisher: Azteca Productions
- First appearance: El Gato Negro #1 (Oct. 1993)
- Created by: Richard Dominguez

In-story information
- Alter ego: Agustin "Gus" Guerrero
- Abilities: Highly trained luchador, Boxing, Expert in Ninjitsu, Expert in Taijutsu

Agustin "Gus" Guerrero, also known as El Gato Negro, is a fictional character and comic book superhero created by Richard Dominguez and published by Azteca Productions. The character made his first appearance in El Gato Negro #1 (October 1993) as a major supporting character. Outside of the comic book continuity he is often referred to as "Silver Age El Gato Negro".

Operating in South Texas, Agustin first donned the alter ego of El Gato Negro in order to form a successful career in Lucha Libre in the early 1950s. The fame he achieved in wrestling allowed him to have several adventures outside of the ring, leading him to use his talents to thwart the activities of the criminal underworld. He would later retire the identity in the late '60s, only for it to be adopted by his grandson nearly three decades later. To the general public, Agustin is regarded as a successful produce-magnate and owner of Guerrero's Produce.

== Publication history ==
=== Creation and conception ===
Richard Dominguez first conceived El Gato Negro sometime in the mid-to-late '80s and originally planned to showcase the character in a largely Latino superhero group dubbed Team Tejas. Dominguez became partial to the character after placing some considerable emphasis on his development, and later placed the Team Tejas project on "the backburner."

El Gato Negro's visual design was largely influenced by the Lucha Libre traditions as well as Dominguez's favorite comic book and pulp superheroes. Included among them was Lee Falks' comic strip superhero the Phantom, a character who is believed to be immortal but in reality, is descended from twenty previous generations of crime-fighters who all adopt the same persona. This, along with other factors, inspired Dominguez to create a predecessor to the modern-day El Gato Negro.

Much of the lucha libre design became recycled in to Agustin "Gus" Guerrero, grandfather to the current incarnation of El Gato Negro. The surname "Guerrero" was initially chosen for its English-translation of "warrior", although Dominguez has hinted at a more historical significance, mainly with ties to the Mexican Revolution.

=== Publication ===
Agustin made his first published appearance in El Gato Negro #1 (Oct. 1993) as a major supporting character in the three part story-arc, "Unknown Passing, Unforgettable Return". This storyline introduced the villain known as El Graduado, son of South Texas crime lord Boss Ochoa, a foe Agustin had faced many times early in his career as El Gato Negro. Although retired from his vigilante activities as El Gato Negro, Agustin did make two separate appearances in costume.

There are plans to release a new series entitled, Lucha Grande Comics, which will depict the early adventures of Agustin Guerrero.

== Fictional character history ==
=== “Silver Age” ===
El Gato Negro in one of his early adventures. Art by Efren Molina.

Agustin was born and raised in Edinburg, Texas by his mother as he was abandoned by his father at a young age. A mysterious figure, even to those who knew him best, Agustin grew up knowing very little of his father other than his ambiguous title of "El Hombre del Gato". Later in life, Agustin enlisted in the Korean War with the Texas Battalion. Separated from his group while on a raid, he became lost in the jungle only to encounter an exiled Japanese warrior and assassin known as Kuro Neko ("黒い猫" - "The Black Cat"). Forming an alliance, the Black Cat trained Tejano in martial arts and stealth. After being rescued and discharged from the military, Agustin returned to Edinburg to begin a career in Lucha Libre. Recognizing the recurring cat motif in his life, Agustin chose the identity of El Gato Negro, promising to bring bad luck to his opponents. Under the management of his friend Paco Perez, Agustin became a famous masked-wrestler in South Texas. But it was his vigilante activities as El Gato Negro that made him a legend amongst the communities of South Texas.

=== Modern Age ===
Agustin cradles his physically drained grandson. Art by Richard Dominguez.

Agustin finally retired from crime-fighting after settling down with Paco's sister Reynalda Perez. Reynalda later died from complications during the birth of their son Francisco. Although his son learned of his father's legacy as El Gato Negro, he abdicated the title, preferring to lead a normal life. Francisco died in a traffic collision with his wife, leaving Agustin to become the legal guardian of the couple's only son, Francisco Jr. Years later, his grandson adopted the mantle of El Gato Negro to avenge the death of his best friend Mario Bustamonte.

During the first few months that Francisco operated as El Gato Negro, he encountered Armando Ochoa, better known as the career-criminal "El Graduado". Son of the successful businessman and drug lord Ignacio Ochoa, an enemy Agustin had faced early in his career, El Graduado planned to take his father's place amongst a criminal organization known as the Annulus. After his attempts at a large drug-trafficking deal are consistently thwarted being foiled by El Gato Negro, a desperate El Graduado held Agustin hostage at his own produce company. After refusing El Graduado's offer to become a "silent partner" he is sentenced to death. Escaping the firing squad, Agustin managed to incapacitate his would-be executioners and allows Francisco enough time to subdue El Graduado.

In 1997's "Enter: The Dogs of War" storyline, Agustin's grandson faced off against the Briones Brothers. The evil duo ambushed El Gato Negro and nearly beat him to death. Despite suffering from near inter-cranial injury, Francisco managed escape and drag himself home, where he collapsed in the arms of his grandfather.

== Skills, abilities and resources ==
El Gato Negro has no superhuman abilities, instead he makes use of his martial arts, boxing, and lucha libre training as well as his own deductive reasoning. Another powerful tool in his arsenal is the fact that the general public believes the vigilante to be something more than human; an urban legend. As most discredit his existence, El Gato Negro is able to do things an ordinary man cannot.

=== Costume ===
Agustin's costume design is typical for the lucha libre tradition, consisting of a black sleeveless shirt, black pants, and a black cat mask. The design of the mask has varied throughout the years, but has retained its familiar cat motif. In some depictions his costume includes a long black cape. The cape was designed more for looks rather than functionality and is generally excluded from the stories.

== In other media ==
=== Film adaptation ===
As of January 2016, Richard Dominguez is currently working with writer-turned-director Michael S. Moore in directing and filming a live-action short-film adaptation titled El Gato Negro: Prey.

=== Television adaptation ===
In February 2019, Deadline Hollywood reported that MGM Television is developing an El Gato Negro television series, with Diego Boneta starring and executive producing the series through his production company Three Amigos, and with Joel Novoa co-executive producing. In September 2019, Robert Rodriguez joined the project to direct and executive produce, with the series originally set to be on Apple TV+.

In February 2024, Amazon Prime Video (which owns MGM) greenlit the series, now titled El Gato, for production in the spring of 2024.
