= El Observador (character) =

Publication information
- Publisher: Azteca Productions
- First appearance: El Gato Negro: Nocturnal Warrior #1 (Nov. 2004)
- Created by: Richard Dominguez

In-story information
- Alter ego: Unknown
- Team affiliations: The Annulus
- Abilities: Master of Capoiera, Expert swordsman, Skilled in use of bladed weapons

El Observador (The Observer) is a fictional character and comic book supervillain appearing in comic books published by Azteca Productions. Co-created by Richard Dominguez and Michael S. Moore, the character made his first appearance in El Gato Negro: Nocturnal Warrior #1 (November 2004).

An expert assassin and mercenary from Brazil, El Observador has an exclusive contract with the South American crime syndicate known as The Annulus. While he possess no superhuman abilities, El Observador is highly skilled with lethal projectiles, bladed weapons, and is a superb hand-to-hand combatant. He is also known by the nickname The Sightless Assassin, due to his lack of human eyes. Instead he has advanced photo lenses attached to his skull that send rapid images to his brain, allowing him to react faster than the average person. El Observador's true identity and origins are currently unknown.

== Fictional character history ==
El Observador’s made his first appearance in the ongoing "Legacy" storyline from El Gato Negro: Nocturnal Warrior (#1-4). The villain El Graduado is enlisting rival mob bosses and street gangs to join the Ochoa crime family in his attempt to become the main narcotics supplier of South Texas. Those who refuse to join are slaughtered by El Observador, who is currently on loan from The Annulus.

The sightless assassin’s first encounter with El Gato Negro was shortly after he killed an entire street gang. Taking their battle to the rooftop of the local produce company, El Observador had the upper hand until the arrival of the Texas Rangers. Both are last seen falling from the building and it is unknown whether either one is taken in to police custody.

== Skills, abilities and resources ==
El Observador's goggles, art by Efren Molina.

El Observador possess no superhuman abilities and instead makes use of his physical prowess, skills with bladed weaponry, and knowledge of various fighting techniques including the Brazilian martial art style of Capoeira.

The most distinctive parts of El Observador's costume are his brown trench coat and wide-brimmed hat. Concealed within his trench coat are several throwing knives and other bladed weapons. His weapons of choice include two long swords which he uses to mercilessly hack away at his opponents. The objects that appear as goggles on his head are in fact highly advanced photo lenses attached to his skull. The lenses take rapid images that are sent directly to his brain, which he quickly interprets to predict his opponent's next move.
