= Pineapple Man =

- Cover art for Pineapple Man #3; Art by Sam Campos

Publication information
- Publisher: SoloGraphics, later Kaaawasaki
- First appearance: Pineapple Man #0: The Hunt (1994)
- Created by: Sam Campos

In-story information
- Alter ego: Isamu Pahoa
- Team affiliations: Grandma Pahoa; Miyoko Tabata; Luk Fun Chun
- Abilities: Superhuman strength and agility Trained hand-to-hand combatant

Pineapple Man is a fictional independent comic book superhero created by Sam Campos and published under the SoloGraphics imprint, formed both by himself and his (now ex) wife Genesis. The character made his debut appearance in a two-part story arc titled Pineapple Man #0: The Hunt in 1994.

Pineapple Man's secret identity is that of Isamu Pohoa, a young Hawaiian man who turned to a life of crime after graduating from high school. After falling out of favor with the crime lord Kawafuchi, Sam is shot and left for dead atop an ancient heiau dedicated to Kukailimoku, the Hawaiian god of war. Instead of dying however, Isamu metamorphosed into the frightful form of Kukailimoku, having both superhuman strength and agility. Learning to control his new-found powers, he reluctantly decides to use them for good, and dons the alter ego of Pineapple Man due to his pineapple-like appearance. The series ran four successful issues, locally outselling Batman and X-Men comics. Currently the comic is on hiatus, with no word of continuation.

== Publication history ==
Limited edition print, art by Sam Campos.

While attending Kahuku High School, Sam Campos was caught reading comics in his art class. His teacher gave him an ultimatum: create his own comic book character over the following weekend or fail the class. The end result was Pineapple Man, a character that drew upon the rich local mythology and celebrated Campos's own Hawaiian culture.

Several years later, Campos and his then wife Genesis attended a comic convention where they met Richard Dominguez, an independent creator and publisher. After having an in-depth discussion on Dominguez's own creation, El Gato Negro, the couple were inspired to create their own independent comic book. They established the SoloGraphics imprint, and working as a husband-and-wife team, revived Campos's Pineapple Man character in the two-part story arc The Hunt published in 1994.

Four successful self-titled issues appeared shortly after, including a special Christmas issue. At the peak of its run, Pineapple Man locally outsold both Batman and X-Men comics, and was distributed internationally. A fifth issue was to be published online in a web comic format but nothing has since materialized. The comic is currently on hiatus with no official word of continuation.

Campos has been called "the nexus for local [Hawaiian] comic book lovers for decades" and is the founder of the Hawaiian Comic Book Alliance.

== See also ==
- Professional Amigos of Comic Art Society
