= Brandy (film) =

1964 film

Cavalca e uccidi
- Spanish: Brandy
- Directed by: José Luis Borau; Mario Caiano
- Screenplay by: José Luis Borau
- Story by: José Mallorquí Figuerola
- Produced by: Eduardo Manzanos
- Starring: Alex Nicol; Robert Hundar; Margaret Gratson; Renzo Palmer; Pauline Baards
- Cinematography: Manuel Merino
- Edited by: Mercedes Alonso
- Music by: Riz Ortolani
- Production companies: Fénix Cooperativa Cinematográfica; Produzioni Europee Associati
- Distributed by: Austria; J.J. Films S.A.; Palace Video Productions; Paramount Pictures; Something Weird Video
- Release date: 30 April 1964 (Italy)
- Running time: 82 minutes
- Countries: Spain; Italy

Brandy AKA Ride and Kill (Italian: Cavalca e uccidi) is a 1964 Spanish/Italian western film directed by José Luis Borau and Mario Caiano, composed by Riz Ortolani and starring Alex Nicol, Roberto Undari and Renzo Palmer. It is based on a story by José Mallorquí Figuerola, who created the character El Coyote. It is the film debut of Mario Caiano.

== Cast ==
- Alex Nicol as Brandy
- Maite Blasco as Eva
- Antonio Casas as Sheriff Clymer
- Jorge Rigaud as Beau
- Luis Induni as Tunnell
- Robert Hundar as Moody
- Renzo Palmer as Pastor Andrews
- Natalia Silva as Alice Garrido
- Giuseppe Addobbati as Judge Stauffer
- Pauline Baards as Mrs. Staffler
- Antonio Gradoli as Underhill
- José Canalejas as Chirlo
- Mark Johnson as Chico
- Miguel del Castillo as Neighbour
- Juan Lizárraga as Neighbour
- Giovanni Petti as Lewitt
- Héctor Quiroga as Murray
- Alfonso Rojas as Hamlin
- José Villasante as Rancher
- Víctor Bayo as Neighbour
- Alfonso de la Vega as Tendero
- Elena Santonja as Mrs. Murray
- Wilfredo Casado as Waiter at the saloon
- Rafael Hernández as Secretary
- Pedro Fenollar
- Manuel Ayuso as Major
- Frank Braña as Driver
- Antonio Orengo as Ciudadano
- Jorge del Moral
- Rafael Bejarano as Cowboy
- Antonio Zamora
- Vicente Cárdenas
