= Guerrero (disambiguation) =

Guerrero is a Mexican state.

Guerrero(s) may also refer to:

== Places ==
Antarctica

- Guerrero Glacier

Argentina

- Guerrero, Buenos Aires, a settlement in Castelli Partido

Colombia

- Estadio Olímpico Pascual Guerrero, sports stadium in Santiago de Cali

Cuba

- Guerrero, Cuba

Mexico

- Guerrero Municipality, Chihuahua
- Guerrero Municipality, Coahuila
- Guerrero, Coahuila
- Guerrero Municipality, Tamaulipas
- Cuilapan de Guerrero, Oaxaca
- Colonia Guerrero, Mexico City
- Guerrero Negro, Baja California Sur
- Guerrero metro station, in Cuauhtémoc, Mexico City
- Guerrero (Mexico City Metrobús), a BRT station in Mexico City
- Montecristo de Guerrero, Chiapas
- Nueva Ciudad Guerrero, Tamaulipas
- Práxedis G. Guerrero, Chihuahua
- Vicente Guerrero, Chihuahua
- Vicente Guerrero, Tlaxcala
- Villa Guerrero, Jalisco
- Villa Guerrero, State of Mexico

== Media ==
- Guerreros, a 2002 Spanish film
- Guerrero 12, a 2011 Mexican film
- Guerrero (film), a 2016 Peruvian film
- "Guerrero" (song), a 2023 song by Emilia
- Two fictional characters featured in comic book titles published by Azteca Productions:
  - Agustin Guerrero (comics), the original El Gato Negro
  - Francisco Guerrero (comics), the modern-day El Gato Negro
- Guerrero, a mercenary in the TV series Human Target
- Soy Guerrero, a statewide television network in Guerrero, Mexico

== Other uses ==
- Guerreiro, Galician/Portuguese equivalent
- Guerrero, a slave ship
- Guerrero Harvest Mouse, a species of rodent
- Los Guerreros, a professional wrestling family
