= The Coyote (film) =

1955 film

- Directed by: Joaquín Luis Romero Marchent; Fernando Soler
- Written by: Pedro Chamorro; Jesús Franco; José Mallorquí (novels); Pedro Masó
- Produced by: Gonzalo Elvira; Ismael Palacio Bolufer
- Starring: Abel Salazar; Gloria Marín; Manuel Monroy
- Cinematography: Ricardo Torres
- Edited by: Antonio Gimeno
- Music by: Odón Alonso
- Production companies: Palacio Films; Oro Films
- Release date: 5 May 1955
- Running time: 75 minutes
- Countries: Mexico; Spain
- Language: Spanish

The Coyote (Spanish: El coyote) is a 1955 Mexican-Spanish western film directed by Joaquín Luis Romero Marchent and Fernando Soler and starring Abel Salazar, Gloria Marín and Manuel Monroy. Based on the character El Coyote created by J. Mallorquí. It was followed by a sequel The Coyote's Justice in 1956.

== Plot ==
In 1848, the dandy-like Cesar de Echague returned to California from the east of the continent. He finds conditions that oppress his Mexican compatriots and only pursue American interests. A rebellion carried out by the inhabitants was bloodily put down; the leaders imprisoned.

During the day, César remains the gentleman he portrays to polite society; At night, however, he becomes a black-masked bandit who sides with the oppressed, and just like Zorro, he leads the insurgents towards their goal: fighting and defeating the oppressors, embodied by the officer of the Northern States, Captain Pots.

== Cast ==
- Abel Salazar as El Coyote / Cesar de Echague
- Gloria Marín
- Manuel Monroy
- Rafael Bardem
- Santiago Rivero as Captain
- Antonio García Quijada
- Mario Moreno
- Julio Goróstegui
- Xan das Bolas
- Pepa Bravo
- Joaquín Burgos
- José Calvo
- Ignacio de Córdoba
- Ignacio de Paúl
- Fernando Delgado
- Luis Domínguez Luna
- Antonio Fornis
- Rufino Inglés
- Mari Sol Luna
- Héctor Mayro
- Antonio Molino Rojo
- Jerónimo Montoro
- Antonio Moreno
- Alfredo Muñiz
- Carlos Otero
- Miguel Pastor
- José María Prada
- Vittorio Pronzatto
- José G. Rey
- José Riesgo
- Emilio Rodríguez
- Lis Rogi
- Pepa Ruiz
- Manuel San Román
- Ángela Tamayo
- Ángel Álvarez

== Bibliography ==
- de España, Rafael. Directory of Spanish and Portuguese film-makers and films. Greenwood Press, 1994.
