= Villa Guerrero =

Villa Guerrero may refer to one of several places in Mexico:

- Villa Guerrero, Jalisco
- Villa Guerrero, State of Mexico

== See also ==
- Guerrero (disambiguation)
