= The Coyote's Justice =

1956 film

- Directed by: Joaquín Luis Romero Marchent
- Written by: Jesús Franco; José Mallorquí
- Produced by: Gonzalo Elvira
- Starring: Abel Salazar; Gloria Marín; Manuel Monroy
- Cinematography: Rafael Pacheco
- Music by: Odón Alonso
- Production companies: Centauro Films; Oro Films
- Release date: 8 March 1956
- Countries: Mexico; Spain
- Language: Spanish

The Coyote's Justice (Spanish: La justicia del Coyote) is a 1956 Mexican-Spanish western film directed by Joaquín Luis Romero Marchent and starring Abel Salazar, Gloria Marín and Manuel Monroy. Based on the character El Coyote created by J. Mallorquí. It was a sequel to the 1955 film The Coyote.

== Plot ==
Don Cesar de Echague, masquerading as the avenger "El Coyote", continues the American troops' fight against injustice and perversion of justice against the Hispanic population of California in the mid-1840s. At the same time, he courts the charming Leonor de Acevedo as a nobleman who lives inconspicuously. She rejects him at first because she only knows him as a cowardly nobleman, but rewards him with her love when she learns about his true calling.

== Cast ==
- Abel Salazar as El Coyote
- Gloria Marín as Leonor de Acevedo
- Manuel Monroy as Mr. Edmund Grin
- Rafael Bardem
- Billy Hayden
- Antonio García Quijada
- Carlos Otero
- Miguel Pastor Mata as coronel Clark
- Julio Goróstegui
- Mario Moreno
- José G. Rey
- Luis Domínguez Luna
- Antonio Fornis
- Emilio Rodríguez as Provocador
- Ángel Álvarez as Fiscal
- Manuel San Román
- Alfredo Muñiz
- Pepita Bravo
- José Riesgo
- Joaquín Burgos
- Antonio Moreno
- Héctor Mayro
- Mary Sol Luna
- José María Prada as Barman

== Bibliography ==
- de España, Rafael. Directory of Spanish and Portuguese film-makers and films. Greenwood Press, 1994.
