= El Observador =

El Observador is Spanish for "The Observer". It may refer to:

== Journalism ==
- El Observador (Chile), a Chilean newspaper published in Quillota
- El Observador (Costa Rica), a Costa Rican newspaper
- El Observador (San Jose), a Californian newspaper published in San Jose
- El Observador (Spain), a Spanish newspaper published in Málaga
- El Observador (Uruguay), a Uruguayan newspaper published in Montevideo
- El Observador (Venezuelan TV program), a Venezuelan newscast of Radio Caracas Televisión
- El Observador de la Realidad, a former Catalan newspaper
- El Observador Ponceño, a former Puerto Rican newspaper
- Observador, a Portuguese newspaper

== Comics ==
- El Observador (comics), a comic book supervillain appearing in comic books published by Azteca Productions
