= Armando Ochoa =

Armando Ochoa may refer to:

== Persons ==
- Armando Xavier Ochoa - Roman Catholic Bishop
- Armando Ochoa - known as El Graduado, fictional character and comic book supervillain
