= El Gato Negro =

Fictional American comic book superheroes

- Both versions of El Gato Negro. Art by Richard Dominguez.
- Publisher: Azteca Productions
- First appearance: El Gato Negro #1 (October 1993)
- Created by: Richard Dominguez
- Characters: Agustin Guerrero; Francisco Guerrero

El Gato Negro (The Black Cat) is the name of two fictional American comic book superheroes created by Richard Dominguez and featured in the Azteca Productions' Universe. Both characters made their first appearance in El Gato Negro #1 (October 1993).

In the comic's continuity, Agustin Guerrero was the first to hold the title of El Gato Negro in the 1950s, creating the pseudonym in order to form a successful career in lucha libre. His motives soon changed however, as he decided to use his talents to fight the criminal element that plagued South Texas. Agustin later retired the alter ego in the late '60s, only for his grandson to adopt it three decades later. Agustin was first introduced as a major supporting character and there are plans to release a series featuring his own exploits as El Gato Negro.

Francisco Guerrero, the second and current incarnation of El Gato Negro, is Agustin's grandson. Francisco makes his living as a social worker in South Texas and devotes most of his free time volunteering for community service. Growing tired of the increasing crime rate in the Lower Rio Grande Valley and haunted by the murder of his friend Mario, Francisco continues the legacy of El Gato Negro, spending his nights fighting against crime. This version often receives comparison to Batman, which is in fact one of the character's many influences.

== Publication history ==
=== Early years ===
El Gato Negro made his debut in El Gato Negro #1 (October 1993). Cover art by Dave Kramer.

The El Gato Negro characters were created by comic book artist and writer Richard Dominguez, both making their first published appearance in El Gato Negro #1 (October 1993) published under Dominguez's own Azteca Productions imprint. The original series followed the adventures of Francisco Guerrero, a social worker living in Edinburg, Texas and grandson to the original El Gato Negro, who adopted his grandfather's former nom de guerre in order to avenge the death of his best friend. The series also introduced Agustin Guerrero, the original El Gato Negro of the early '50s and late '60s, as a major supporting character. Although the character officially retired from his former vigilante-activities, Agustin did appear in costume at the climax of the first story-arc entitled, "Unknown passing, Unforgettable Return" (El Gato Negro #1-3).

Dominguez had originally intended to introduce El Gato Negro as member of a largely Latino superhero group dubbed Team Tejas, but after placing considerably more emphasis on his character development, Dominguez ultimately decided to abandon the Team Tejas project for a later date. The character's secret identity, Francisco Guerrero, was devised to have direct ties to the Mexican Revolution. His given name was borrowed from Mexican revolutionary Francisco "Pancho" Villa, while the surname Guerrero was mainly chosen for its English-translation "warrior", although Dominguez has hinted at a more historical significance, one which has yet to be revealed. Meanwhile, the shared alter-ego of El Gato Negro originated from an abandoned settlement by the name of "El Gato", located south of Pharr, Texas.

The character's personality and visual design was greatly influenced by Dominguez's own favorite pulp and comic book superheroes (most noticeably Batman) along with classic Mexican luchadors such as El Santo. Another strong influence was Lee Falk's The Phantom, a crime-fighter believed to be immortal but is in fact descended from 20 previous generations of crime-fighters who all adopted the same persona. This, along with Dominguez's own appreciation of the Silver Age of Comics, inspired the creation of a predecessor to the modern-day El Gato Negro. This character is now known as Agustin Guerrero, a former luchador-turned-adventurer of the late '50s and '60s.

The Francisco Guerrero incarnation of El Gato Negro became a popular character soon after his introduction, the first printing of the series actually sold-out within two months. A notable 1997 issue revived Margarito C. Garza's Relampago character, his first published appearance in nearly fifteen years. The series was later placed on hiatus during the late '90s, although the character consistently made appearances in other media.

=== 2000s ===
In 2004, rather than return to the original series, Dominguez launched a brand new series continuing the adventures of El Gato Negro entitled, "El Gato Negro: Nocturnal Warrior". For this, Dominguez enlisted the aid of Michael S. Moore to serve as writer and co-plotter, having previously worked together on the first published issue of Team Tejas. The series also featured the work of guest penciller Efren Molina, while Dominguez acted as letterer and inker. The combination of Moore's writing style and Molina's pencils gave the new series a few stylistic changes from its predecessor.

Plans to release a compilation series of the original El Gato Negro series are currently in the works. A brand new limited series entitled Lucha Grande Comics which will feature the early adventures of Agustin Guerrero is also in development.

== Fictional character biographies ==
=== Agustin "Gus" Guerrero ===
Separated from the Texas Battalion while on a raid, Agustin became lost in the harsh jungles of Korea only to encounter an exiled Japanese warrior and assassin known as "The Black Cat". Forming an alliance, the Black Cat properly trained the lost Tejano in martial arts and stealth. After being rescued and discharged from the military, Agustin returned to South Texas to begin a career in Lucha Libre. Recognizing a recurring cat motif in his life, Agustin chose the identity of El Gato Negro, promising to bring bad luck to his opponents. However, it was his vigilante activities outside of the ring that made him a legend among the communities of South Texas. Agustin's incarnation of El Gato Negro had become so much a part of the local folklore that few even acknowledge his existence, referring to him as a "fairy tale". His motives soon changed, however, as he decided to use his talents to fight the criminal element that plagued South Texas. Agustin later retired the alter ego in the late 1960s, only for his grandson to adopt it three decades later.

=== Francisco "Pancho" Guerrero ===
The second and current El Gato Negro, Francisco Guerrero is a social worker by day and a vigilante by night. The citizens of Southwest Texas believe Francisco to be the original El Gato Negro, returning once again to rid Texas of evil. Prior to becoming the new El Gato, Francisco was growing tired of the increasing crime rate in his hometown of Edinburg, Texas. The final straw being the death of his friend, Mario, a border patrol officer who was overpowered and murdered by several drug-runners. Deciding to take action, with the permission of his grandfather, Francisco adopted the moniker of El Gato Negro and operated as the Nocturnal Warrior for several months, successfully fighting against crime. Despite being popular with the citizens of his community, El Gato Negro is constantly being hunted by local law enforcement led by police Captain Miguel Bustamonte, Francisco's best friend and Mario's older brother.

=== Antonio Trujillo ===
A former member of the EZLN in the Mexican state of Chiapas, Antonio emigrated to Edinburg, Texas, United States, along with his wife Rosarita, where they both struggled to adjust to their new lives. Fortunately, social worker Francisco Guerrero helped to get the couple settled in their new home and gain citizenship. Antonio later landed a job at a local mechanic shop, eventually becoming an owner of his own establishment Taller Trujillo. Francisco confided with his friend his identity as El Gato Negro, and in return for his help, Antonio is considered to be a "tech tool" and constructs much of the tools he needs to fight crime.

== In other media ==
=== Film adaptation ===
As of January 2016, Richard Dominguez is currently working with writer-turned-director Michael S. Moore in directing and filming a live-action short-film adaptation titled El Gato Negro: Prey.

=== Television adaptation ===
In February 2019, Deadline Hollywood reported that MGM Television is developing an El Gato Negro television series, with Diego Boneta starring and executive producing the series through his production company Three Amigos, and with Joel Novoa co-executive producing. In September 2019, Robert Rodriguez joined the project to direct and executive produce, with the series originally set to be on Apple TV+.

In February 2024, Amazon Prime Video (which owns MGM) greenlit the series, now titled El Gato, for production in the spring of 2024.
