= Guerreiro =

Guerreiro is a Galician and Portuguese word for "warrior". It can be found as a surname in Portuguese-speaking countries. This surname is strongly associated with the city and county of Loule, in the south of Portugal.

Notable people with the surname include:

- Ana Maria Guerreiro Dias (born 1974), Portuguese long-distance and marathon runner
- André Guerreiro Rocha (born 1984), Brazilian footballer
- Anita Guerreiro (1936–2025), Portuguese actress and fado singer
- Fabrício Guerreiro (born 1990), Brazilian mixed martial artist
- Félix Guerreiro (born 1950), Portuguese footballer (forward)
- Joana Isabel Cipriano Guerreiro (born 1996), Portuguese child murder victim
- Jonathan Guerreiro (born 1991), Russian-Australian ice dancer
- Katia Guerreiro (born 1976), Portuguese singer
- Leandro Guerreiro (born 1978), Brazilian footballer (defensive midfielder)
- Luis A. Guerreiro (born 1956), Portuguese psychologist, writer, journalist, and poet
- Márcio Guerreiro (born 1981), Brazilian footballer (midfielder)
- Pedro Guerreiro de Jesus Correia (born 1987), Portuguese footballer (defender)
- Pedro Guerreiro (born 1966), Portuguese politician
- Ramiro Saraiva Guerreiro (1918–2011), Brazilian politician and diplomat
- Raphaël Guerreiro (born 1993), Portuguese footballer
- Roger Guerreiro (born 1982), Brazilian-Polish footballer (midfielder)
- Toninho Guerreiro (1942–1990), Brazilian footballer (forward)

== See also ==
- Guerrero (disambiguation), Spanish equivalent
- O Dragão da Maldade Contra o Santo Guerreiro, a 1969 Brazilian film
