= Crusher (comics) =

Crusher is the name of three supervillains appearing in American comic books published by Marvel Comics.

== Publication history ==
The first Crusher first appeared in Thor #130 and was created by Stan Lee and Jack Kirby.

The second Crusher first appeared in Tales of Suspense #91 (July 1967), and was created by Stan Lee and Gene Colan. The character died in his second appearance in Iron Man #6 and his body later appeared in Daredevil #119 (March 1975).

The third Crusher first appeared in Daredevil #119 (March 1975), and was created by Jenny Blake Isabella and Bob Brown. The character died in the same issue.

== Fictional character biography ==
=== Servant of Pluto ===
Crusher

Publication information
- Publisher: Marvel Comics
- First appearance: Thor #130 (July 1966)
- Created by: Stan Lee; Jack Kirby

In-story information
- Species: Human Mutate
- Abilities: Superhuman strength Immunity to diseases

In an effort to free Hercules from Pluto's thrawl, Thor battles his way through the forces of Pluto. Pluto sends Crusher to fight against Thor. As no opponent had broken free from Crusher's grasp before, Thor is the first to do so and sends Crusher flying. Pluto releases Hercules from his thrall to prevent Thor from shattering the Greek underworld.

=== Caldwell Rozza ===
Crusher

Publication information
- Publisher: Marvel Comics
- First appearance: Tales of Suspense #91 (July 1967)
- Created by: Stan Lee; Gene Colan

In-story information
- Alter ego: Caldwell Rozza
- Species: Human Mutate
- Notable aliases: "El Professor"
- Abilities: Superhuman strength Durable skin Enhanced weight

Caldwell Rozza is a Cuban scientist in South America who creates a formula that would make the President of his country the "master of the world." The President does not trust Rozza and has him test the formula on himself. The formula causes Rozza to grow in size and strength, becoming Crusher, a giant, rock-hard, immensely heavy superhuman. The President, intending to use Crusher as an asset to his army, tells Crusher to kill Iron Man so he can be promoted and become a general. Iron Man defeats Crusher, who falls through the floor and lands underground.

Crusher lands in Subterranea, where the formula that gave him his powers wears off. While exploring Subterranea, he finds Tyrannus' abandoned base and uses the materials there to recreate the Crusher formula. After the formula is complete, Crusher digs to the surface to get revenge on Iron Man. After making his way to the surface, Crusher finds the men who smuggled him into America and forces them to help him to Stark Industries. Crusher battles Iron Man and takes Whitney Frost hostage to force Iron Man to hand over the Centrifugal Ray to him. Iron Man tackles Crusher and carries him to the ocean in an attempt to knock him out utilizing the thin atmosphere of lower orbit. However, Crusher's attempts to break free cause Iron Man to lose his grip, knocking Crusher into the waters below. Crusher is so heavy that he sinks to the bottom of the ocean and drowns.

=== Juan Aponte ===
Crusher

Publication information
- Publisher: Marvel Comics
- First appearance: Daredevil #119 (March 1975)
- Created by: Jenny Blake Isabella; Bob Brown

In-story information
- Alter ego: Juan Aponte
- Species: Human Mutate
- Abilities: Superhuman strength Durable skin Enhanced weight

Coroner Dr. Jakkelburr receives the first Crusher's body following his death and studies him to recreate the formula. Jakkelburr successfully recreates the formula and gives it to Juan Aponte, a bantamweight boxer who intends to become a heavyweight boxer. The formula causes Juan to become aggressive and eventually transform into a mindless version of the Crusher. Crusher battles Daredevil and tears up Fogwell's Gym in the fight. When he accidentally causes a wall to topple toward his coach Pop Fenton and former boxer Father Gawaine, Crusher rescues them, but is crushed by the falling wall. Juan reverts to his normal form and dies in Fenton's arms.

== Powers and abilities ==
The first Crusher possesses superhuman strength and is immune to diseases.

The Caldwell Rozza and Juan Aponte incarnations of Crusher possess superhuman strength, durable skin, and enhanced weight.
