= The Guardian Line =

Christian comic book

- Company type: Private
- Industry: Publishing
- Founded: 2004
- Headquarters: Chicago, Illinois
- Key people: C. Jeffrey Wright, CEO; Michael Davis, VP Creative; Cherly Clemetson, VP Editorial; Kathy Steward, Editor, Trudi Gentry, Brand Manager
- Products: comic books
- Website: TheGuardianLine.com

The Guardian Line is a Christian comic book line published by UMI Media, a division of publishing and media firm Urban Ministries Inc.

== Publishing history ==
The line launched in December 2006 and was created by Michael Davis, co-founder of Milestone Media and the comic "Static!" Static was made into a WB cartoon called Static Shock. The four debut titles on the line are Code, Joe & Max, The Seekers and Genesis 5. The characters inhabit the Guardian Universe located in the fictional city of New Hope. The line is distributed by Diamond Comic Distributors and UMI.

== Titles ==
- Code - Think Jason Bourne meets John Shaft with a Bible. This guy can't remember a thing except the fact that he's defending the city of New Hope from Steven Dark.
- Jesse (from The Seekers) - This kid "finds" an iPod in the church and decides to take it for a spin. Turns out the player is a time travel machine that gives him and his best friend the ability to travel back in time.
- Joe - A braided-up 11-year-old boy with his own Guardian Angel (Max). Joe can save New Hope in the future, but not if Steven Dark gets him first. Max protects him, but only by speaking in scripture from the Bible.
- The Messenger - This wise old man links the characters to God.
