= Margarito C. Garza =

American judge (1931–1995)

Margarito C. Garza (October 29, 1931 – November 15, 1995) was an American judge and comic book enthusiast. He served as the 148th District Court Judge of Corpus Christi, Texas. for three terms in the 1980s to the 1990s and served two terms as Judge of the Nueces County Court at Law from 1972 to 1976 .He also served as Assistant District Attorney in Corpus Christi in the late 1960s. Garza was the first Mexican American to be elected to a judgeship in Nueces County. He was also notable for creating the first Mexican-American comic book hero, Relampago, in 1977 and was a pioneer in the nascent industry of comic retailers. Garza died in 1995 after a lifetime of public service to his community.

== Relampago ==
Garza created Relampago shortly after attending a local comic book convention. Tired of seeing the same crimes being tried in his court-room, he had created the superhero as a way to exercise his own fantasies of fighting crime. As he further developed the character and storyline, Judge Garza sent letters to Marvel and DC Comics telling them of his creation, but both companies showed little interest. He would later try to get a listing in a comic pricing guide, but the publishers said the character was "too obscure". The Judge decided to maintain the comic in a self-published print, becoming more of a personal project than a money-making venture.

Relampago made his first published appearance in Relampago! #1 in 1977. Only 1,000 copies of the original book were printed at the time and many of them destroyed soon after due to concerns of possible copyright infringement, making it a rarity among collectors. Only two subsequent issues followed soon after. Several years later, the comic attracted the attention of Richard Dominguez, a Dallas illustrator, who found an issue of the comic in a half-price book store.

Forming a close friendship, Garza and Dominguez planned a Relampago revival series. Their progress was hindered, however, due to Garza's long hours in court and hectic schedule. To prove himself to the Judge, Dominguez published his own comic book titled El Gato Negro in 1993. Garza realized how serious Dominguez was and agreed to collaborate on a new Relampago series with a planned cross-over issue featuring their respective heroes. This collaboration never came to be however, as Judge Garza died in 1995 before a script could be written.
