= El Coyote (character) =

Fictional character from the Wild West

- Cover illustrated by Francisco Batet "Huracan sobre Monterrey" (sic); Spanish Ediciones Cliper, Barcelona; El Coyote pulp novel #2, October 1944
- First appearance: Novelas del Oeste, novel N° 9, late 1943, "El Coyote" (Editorial Molino, Barcelona)
- Created by: José Mallorquí

In-universe information
- Aliases: César de Echagüe: alter ego El Coyote; aka José Martinez (Lopez) and Commander Delharty
- Nationality: A Spanish pulp novel series 1944–1953, with 192 stories from California 1846–1876, published by Ediciones Cliper

El Coyote (the Coyote or prairie wolf) is a fictional character (operating during the time of the American "Wild West"), originally presented in a Spanish Novelas del Oeste ("Stories of the West") Number 9 pulp novel in late 1943, written by Carter Mulford, later as J. Mallorquí. Mulford was one of several pseudonyms of the successful Spanish author José Mallorquí y Figuerola (1913–1972). The novel was issued by the Barcelona publishing house Editorial Molino. Mallorquí was so satisfied with his work, that he now started writing a series - encouriged by his wife - of extremely popular novels with the character "El Coyote" in the head role - giving his hero a personality, milieu and approach different to Johnston McCulley's El Zorro's (the Fox) - for Ediciones Cliper in Barcelona. Between September 1944 and late 1953 the hero appeared in a series of 192 pulp-like EL COYOTE novels, with several revival editions throughout the years.

The novels covered 30 years of chronological adventures from 1851 (and earlier - from 1846 and on) until around 1876. Because of the long time span and multiple occasions of Coyote semi-retirement "the door is open for many more adventures in the future". The original Cliper novels were not published in strict chronological order. Several stories began during the 1870s, remembering earlier events - or sometimes a short early years intro, with the main plot occurring several years later. Cover illustrators were not always identical to inside illustrators. The novels – and the comics – were also glued in album collections and sold in hardbound "limited bookform". Cliper issued the original novels in batches of 5 to 7 hardbound albums during the early years (and many comics from 1947). Cid had 24 volumes with 134 novels, and Forum had one collection with all 192 novels in 16 hardbound volumes (and also one with a limited number of new comics).

== Spanish editions ==
- Cliper (1944–1953) – the original editions (which also featured the very first novel, El Coyote) – 192 novels (originally 2.50 and a short while 2.00 pesetas each – later 3 and 4) - with a celibrating original number 50, Luces de California, in mid 1947 at 3.60 - covering the last episode of Coyote's fights against Robert Toombs. Covers and insides illustrated by Francisco Batet (Pellejero). The first 120 in the "El Coyote" novel series started with number 1, La vuelta del Coyote ("The return of El Coyote"), in September 1944. There also were 10 Numero Extra (see below – including one Extra-Especial) – and finally 62 (4 and later 5 pesetas) "Nuevo Coyote" were published (no inside illustration).
- Cid (1961–1964) with reeditions of above in one series of 64-100 pages (18,4x10,8 cm) illustrated by Jano (Francisco Fernández Zarza-Pérez) and possibly others.
- Bruguera (1968–1971) - 110 of the early novels (including nine Extras, but not the unnumbered Especial) with El proscrito de las lomas as the last (17,5x10,5 cm - 112-136 pages). Covers illustrated by Antonio Bernal (Romero) - and with several inside illustrations.
- Favencia (1973–1977) - the 192 novels (18,0x10,9 cm and circa 136 pages each) with high quality illustrations especially by Jano (see Cid above) - and by Carlos Prunés. Inside illustrations by Pedro Alferes Gonzales, and Ramon de la Fuente.
- Forum (1983–1984) with 96 reedited double volumes (19,0x14,1 cm - each volume with 128-250 pages) – covers illustrated by Salvador Fabá (who really succeeds with superb and tough images of the hero); insides by Julio Bosch and José María Bellalta (who also did the fine comics - with J. Garcia, manuscript).
- Planeta DeAgostini (2003–2004) with the above 96 (21,0x14,7 cm - each volume with circa 160-300 pages) illustrated by Tony Fejzula & R.M. Gera.

The original novel El Coyote (written in 1943) was reedited in September 2025 with a prologue, and published by Albo - Zarco.

== Vigilante hero ==
California was incorporated into the US in February 1848. The conquest of California became one of the results of the Mexican–American War from April 26, 1846 (in which the history of Texas also had an important role) to February 2, 1848, after several turbulent California years as part of Mexico and even twice as a short-lived independent republic (1836 and 1846) - and before the great gold rush. The new "region", originally administrated by the US military was, because of the gold findings, skipping the "Territory status" and registered as the 31st State of the United States on September 9, 1850.

Mexico had started its fight for independence in 1810 and became free from Spain in 1821 during the era of the legendary El Zorro, who debuted at the time Spain reigned (about two generations - circa 40 years - before Coyote's debut).

=== El Coyote's double identity ===
El Coyote (from Ediciones Cliper) illustrated by Francisco Batet, 1946, inside the novels.

César de Echagüe (the III – with Mexican and Spanish roots) was a wealthy Californio nobleman. He was resident at the large estate and ranch - 40,000 hectare (100,000 acres or 400 km2) cattle farming (and possibly also sheep and horse plus some winery), and later also orange cultivating - el Rancho de San Antonio, just north-east of Los Angeles. César had a conventionally charming appearance, was regarded a coward and a feminine, effete (weak) figure - and he was lazy, comfortable, cynical and sceptic - with false superficiality. He was described as educated and refined, a master of expression, and a practical, pragmatic man.

Behind his facade he doubled as El Coyote, a masked vigilante avenger, expert of disguise - wanted by the law - and defender of the weak, fighting for freedom, honesty, justice and vengeance. Coyote protected the original Hispanics (and the Native Americans - Indians) of California from the Anglo Americans - and certainly from all "bad ones". Mallorquí did address the Afro-American question only briefly.

=== Heroes don't die - they vanish ===
The Coyote stories continued the mythical traditions of Robin Hood, Dick Turpin, Dumas' d'Artagnan and The Three Musketeers, and The Scarlet Pimpernel (the last one published in 1905 - debuting on theater in 1903, which was the very first popular novel with the "double identity" plot). Dime novel detective Nick Carter debuted in 1886. Tarzan was introduced in 1912, Doctor Syn (not the original but an early "Scarecrow") in 1915, and El Zorro found its way to the public in 1919, but El Coyote became even bigger – in Spain. Among other early famous, often masked American novel and/or radio heroes, were Charlie Chan (original idea already in 1919) with the first novel in 1925 (movies 1926), The Shadow, debuting 1930 on radio (and 1931 in novels), plus The Phantom Detective, Doc Savage, The Spider and the Lone Ranger in 1933, and the Green Hornet in 1936. Some of the very early comic strip superheroes (or costumed crime-fighters) were Buck Rogers introduced in 1928, Dick Tracy 1931, and Flash Gordon in 1934. The most famous comic book (or strip) hero is Superman originated in 1933 (and commercially published in 1938). In 1934 Lee Falk's Mandrake debuted, and in 1936 his The Phantom (character) - comic strip. Batman and the original Captain Marvel entered in 1939. Captain America and the originals of The Flash, Green Lantern and Daredevil made their debuts in 1940. Wonder Woman, Blackhawk and Green Arrow debuted in 1941, and in 1947 Black Canary entered the scene.

=== Coyote's appearance ===
Coyote wore a neatly trimmed pencil mustache (bigote fino - fine moustache) - and a black (mostly illustrated as dark blue, also in the comics – and sometimes brown) Mexican, decorated charro costume. He had high boots (often outside the pants) and a decorated jarano sombrero, a black or white shirt – neither blue nor red – although most drawings show a white shirt (on the Scandinavian covers blue), with a black (sometimes shown as red or blue) silk scarf - but mostly a red tie. He also had a black belt (sometimes illustrated as a red silk one – although mostly as a brown belt), plus two holstered revolvers (Western dual holster gun belt with cartridge) hanging low on double cartridge belts (often only one belt shown). Some illustrations show only one revolver with cartridge belt and holster – but mostly two revolvers. He also had a combat knife or dagger – and a rifle (in later years probably a Winchester), a lasso and a Mexican sarape on his horse – and he sometimes wore gloves.

The mask - an antifaz - covered more of his upper face than shown on most of the fine drawings by Francisco Batet (and especially by several others). The Scandinavian covers presented a relatively large mask (illustrated by Harald Damsleth). In at least one of the early pulps Mallorquí wrote he wore "Mexican peasant clothes" (black – shown brown on some of the very early illustrations by Batet - also on several later editions). On the Cid covers in the 1960s and on most of the Favencia covers Coyote wore a black or dark blue charro costume (just like Mallorqui preferred it). In all of the reedited Forum novels of the 1980s Coyote wore a blue modern-like charro, decorated blue sombrero, white shirt, red tie and black or brown belt, plus a brown cartridge belt with two holstered revolvers - no gloves - and long boots (mostly with pants outside). The Spanish (and Aztec) word "coyote" was also used describing a racial category. El Coyote had two "marks" – one was shooting at an ear lobe of his villains for warning, one was a drawing of a wolf's head on messages.

== Novels ==
Cliper in Barcelona started publishing the original "El Coyote" series in September 1944 and issued 120 volumes up to March 1951. During 1945-1946 ten "Extra" volumes also were issued (including a reedition of the 1943 "El Coyote" novel), and finally 62 "Nuevo Coyote" were published by Cliper between 1951 and 1953.

=== Original 120 Spanish novels ===
The novel series comprised the years from December 1851 - and with Cliper number 6 from early 1865 to around 1875. The overwhelming majority of the novels covered the years from 1865 to 1874 (although our hero several times told older stories to his second wife - and to his son from his first marriage - which also included adventures before 1851). Published in Spain, the novels originally consisted of 120 volumes 1944–1951 – the last titled Alias el Coyote in March 1951. They were not always strictly chronological. The interesting and most obvious example is the 1852-1853 (extended, Extra Ordinario 6 pesetas) story El Diablo, Murrieta y el Coyote, where César and Guadalupe in 1872 take us back to fascinating events happening in the around two years of Coyote "quasi-retirement", with César marrying Leonor and César's father still alive - Cliper novel number 100 and its sequel. In these novels Joaquin Murrieta, who was a "real life" Sonora, Mexico – and later California – famous bandit, is presented in the Mallorqui way. The California Rangers killed him in 1853 in Fresno County, but in the novels here he marries César's cousin Maria Elena (and is not killed).

The original novel number 115, El hogar de los valientes, and its sequel (El tribunal del Coyote), take us back to 1854 and possibly also 1855, before Jr was born. There was also the highly appreciated La gloria de don Goyo (original Cliper number 95), which told a story of April 1865 - directly after the murder of Lincoln – late civil war era soon after César's "second arrival" in Los Angeles, where the Bella Union and Fort Moore were two frequently featured establishments in the novels. A late original Cliper novel (number 113) - the six-year-celebration - still 4 pts - issue, published in 1950, La casa de los Valdez and its sequel, told a story César picked up in Spain in 1857 about César I (his grandfather arriving in California in 1767 with Junipero Serra – the story begins and ends in 1872 at home at the San Antonio ranch). In the original novel number 40 - Un ilustre forastero - the story concentrates on Don Pedro Celestino Carvajal de Amarantes (who had been impersonated by Coyote in the prequal - and here), Don Pedro had fled from Mexico (and president Benito Juárez) in late 1871, due to his relationship with Porfirio Diaz. That novel is an interesting intro to Coyote's non-killing adventures at the king-sized Todo-ranch in Mexico, 1872.

=== 10 Numero Extra and 62 Nuevo Coyote ===
Simultaneously published were 10 Numero Extra (1945–1946), including a reedited version of the original 1943 pulp El Coyote (issued as Edicion Cliper Extra #0 in 1945) and the Especial of 1946 noted below (no numbering at all). The Extras told stories of pre-1851, early and late 1850s and mid/late 1860s. Later came 62 "reformed" Nuevo Coyote (still on Cliper 1951–1953 - now with limited inside ilustration) – the first published in mid 1951 (Vuelve el Coyote - "Coyote is back"). The new series told old, later and new stories – some intervening in the old chronology – and with a pocket size, turning from the first 130 novels' size of 19,6x14,8 cm and mostly 64 pages to "pocket sized" 15,1x10,3 cm and in general 128 pages. The last Nuevo Coyote (number 62) was titled Los asesinos llegan a Monterrey, inside baptized Los asesinos van a Monterrey. The novel ends with a statement: "Last and unfinished adventure" - Ultima e inacabada aventura (Coyote didn't die - but vanished).

=== International publishing ===
The early "Coyote" novels were published in at least 16 countries in ten different languages. Italy published all 192, often with the same covers as Cliper and with the later ones (with non-Cliper covers) illustrated by Emilio Uberti (and especially Sergio Tarquinio inside). Germany published 84 novels, several with Batet's original Cliper illustrations – including reeditions (with different publishers) and new illustrators. Finland had 78 volumes, mostly with Batet illustrations. The original editions in Norway, Denmark and Sweden (with no illustration inside - confirmed Swedish number of pages per volume: 92-96) often had identical covers (special unique ones made for these three countries 18x12 cm).

Several illustrations on the Scandinavian editions, by Harald Damsleth, are by many ranked as the finest. One of the Cliper cover illustrations was "recycled" in Scandinavia - the original Cliper cover of Huracán sobre Monterrey, which was "covered" by Damsleth in the Swedish and Norwegian versions of Plomo en una estrella (original novel number 79). That novel actually was a circa 1873-74 story, featuring the father and his grown-up son in San Lorenzo Valley (fictional Farish City). It was not fitting chronologically with the other later Swedish novels. Damsleth's "recycle" also appeared on the Danish version of Tras las mascara del Coyote (original novel number 17, featuring Yesares and Guadalupe - where she decides to marry Don Goyo's son). Brazil, often Batet and Bernal covers (but also several others), published all novels in different editions, except for the high-ranked (extended, 6 pesetas) Extra-Especial on the elder Don César de Echagüe.

=== Ten Numero Extra - synopsis ===
- El Coyote (Extra N° 0) – the reedition of the Carter Mulford 1943 pulp – in most of the later editions the original/first volume – but on Cliper published in circa mid 1945, probably directly after #12 (now with Mallorquí as official writer), covering César's arrival in Los Angeles in December 1851, synopsis
- La justicia del Coyote (Extra N° 1, published in 1945) – a story in San Francisco of the mid/late 1860s, when the railway between East and West was established (First transcontinental railroad). Coyote works with Captain Farrell, synopsis
- La primera aventura del Coyote (Extra N° 2, the last two issued after the original novel #9) – César in around 1869, remembering Coyote's debut 23 years earlier, synopsis
- La mano del Coyote (issued after the original novel #11) – a late 1860s story featuring Ricardo Yesares and Teodomiro Mateos, synopsis
- El precio del Coyote (issued after the original novel #12) – a story in San Francisco around the mid/late 1860s, featuring Guadalupe and Matias Alberes, synopsis
- Vieja California (published around mid 1946) - an extended, very high ranked story of turbulent California in January 1846 and 20 years later, based on actual historic events with Coyote really in the vigilante role, synopsis
- El jinete enmascarado (sic) - (published in September 1946) – a story of goldfinding in 1850, where José Martínez – alias El Coyote – alias César de Echagüe actually meets Edmond Greene before Greene was engaged to Beatriz, synopsis
- Trueno negro (published in late 1946, the last three after the original novel #35) – yet another story of the secret "Coyote" of 1850 before César's first official arrival in L.A., synopsis
- Una sombra en Capistrano (Extra N° 8, published in December 1946 – issued directly after original novel #38) – Coyote of 1869 looks back on another story of 1859, featuring Fray Jacinto, synopsis
- and Extra-Especial Don César de Echagüe (published in May 1946, probably soon after the original novel #21) – about César's father and his death – featuring Leonor, Guadalupe, Julián, Adelia and los Lugones, where the story jumps from around 1870 back to March 1854, soon after César's first marriage, and then to "real time" again, synopsis. This is one of the longest and by many considered the best novel. It also included a nice presentation of the main characters, with drawings by Batet.

Although the Extras, numbered 0–8 (4 pesetas each), and the Extra-Especial (no number at all – 6 pesetas) on Ediciones Cliper – all issued during the very first years (1945–46) – did not have any of the two separate series' original novels' issue numbers, they have later "entered" the 192 numbering – just like the "Nuevo Coyote" series, which was originally numbered 1–62 on Cliper - but beginning with number 131 in later listings. All reedited publishings, except Bruguera (1-110) have the numbers 1-192 - although not all in the same order.

== Main plot and characters ==
César was born in Los Angeles (originally called "el Pueblo de Nuestra Señora la Reina de los Ángeles"), which he left around late 1843 for Mexico and later Havana (Cuba) to study and "become a man". He "officially" returned in December 1851 (described in the very first novel as have been away from Los Angeles for seven years - later information tells us it was eight), although operating as "El Coyote" in California several times before that, secretly leaving Mexico during his years abroad.

=== César de Echagüe alias "El Coyote" ===
In Mallorquí's first novel, El Coyote, one can trace that César must have been born around 1827 (the novel says he was 25 by his arrival in Los Angeles in late 1851, probably not via el Rio Porciuncúla - although the very first novel told so - but possibly via San Pedro Bay (California). One can read about Coyote's debut in La primera aventura del Coyote, an early Extra novel, where César was inspired by a masked female actress and by the Zorro legend when he started operating as El Coyote. Mallorquí truly gave credit in this novel to El Zorro being a great influence to the Coyote character. Coyote later told his son, "El Cuervo", in the stories on César Jr's adventures of late 1872 (when Jr was around 16 to 17 years old), that "El Coyote" debuted even younger than his son, long before aged 20 (that differs from the story of the debut adventure above with a span of about three years, 1843~1846, which may suggest that his actual birth may have been around 1830).

=== Coyote's original family ===
Coyote's father, who had experienced the turbulent years of Spanish and Mexican California, was Don César de Echagüe (II), who was told about Coyote's true identity just prior to his death soon after César's first marriage. César's sister Beatriz (aka Beatrice) was probably born around the early 1830's. She married Washington resident, political employee and early special Emissary to California, Edmond Greene (aka Edmonds or Edmons, nicknamed Edmondo), who spoke fluent Spanish. Edmond found out Coyote's true identity in late 1851 – and Beatriz had suspected that early on (but never told anybody - in some later novels the author gives us the impression she had not found out). They settled in Washington (although later moving back to California to Beatriz's own estate).

César's first wife Leonor de Acevedo (aka Leonora/Leonore) was born around 1833 (on yet another big ranch near San Antonio – and was betrothed to César already as a child). She became aware of Coyote's double identity by the end of the very first written novel. They married around late 1853, during an at least two years period of Coyote retirement. She died sometime around 1856, at César Jr's birth. Jr did not find out about his father's true identity until El hijo del Coyote around his early teens in the late 1860s (original Cliper novel number 11 - one of the most popular novels - in which Matias Alberes made his debut). Jr called himself El Cuervo (no mask), the Raven, from around late 1872 – although he later abandoned his nickname. César (Coyote) left Los Angeles again - this time devastated - directly after his wife's death (even travelling to Europe and Spain, handing over the child-care to maiden Guadalupe Martinez). Jr was reported 15 years old (from now on subsequently increasing his role in the novels) in Padre e hijo and its sequel Cachorro de Coyote, original volumes number 34 and 35, featuring the very clever Chris Wardell villain and recently wed (and now also a mother) Guadalupe, plus Ricardo Yesares in late 1871.

=== Coyote's second wife ===
César was abroad again (Europe this time) during 1857-early 1865. Long before his official return, before the murder of Lincoln on April 14, 1865 - just as at his first absence from Los Angeles - César secretly worked as Coyote, and outside California as unmasked José Martinez (also shortly as José Lopez), after only a few years abroad. One adventure was specifically dated 1859, La sombra del Coyote (novel number 4), with a preface of 1849. At least for a while during the civil war (April 1861–May 1865) César secretly worked as a neutral (union soldier) Commander at a San Carlos, San Diego fortress under the alias of "Delharty" (shortly before his second return to L.A. in early 1865 – encouraged by Edmond Greene to return home), working to keep California out of the war, helping both northerners and southerners in El Capataz del Ocaso (original novel number 109) and its sequels (where César looks back from the mid 1870s to the last year of the war). César Jr was reported eight years of age in early 1865 (and met his father for the first time),

Guadalupe Martinez was nicknamed Lupe/Lupita (aka Guadelupe). She was the daughter of Julián (aka as Julian) Martinez, Coyote's very first close allied (from 1851) and chief servant (and foreman) at César's father Don César's ranch. Julián died just prior to Guadalupe's marriage. Lupe was born around 1836 and married César around late 1870 – in El Diablo en Los Angeles (number 18). By the end of novel number 20 (La hacienda trágica) César and Guadalupe truly at last "find one another'. Guadalupe and Julián had known of César's double identity from very early on – Julián was told by Coyote (probably even before 1851 – and Lupe found out by "coincidence" in 1853 – in La vuelta del "Coyote", Cliper novel number 1). César's and Lupe's child Leonorin was born in 1871 – and fosterchild Eduardito (Gómez de la Mata) that same year (in the high ranked Rapto, number 26). Guadalupe later became de Torres (Julián's real name) and suddenly – in early/mid 1872, El código del Coyote - number 43 (considered one of the very best novels in the series, due to Coyote long-time expert Miguel Muñoz - "La Nueva Web El Coyote"). with its prequels and sequels, in which Matias Alberes, César Jr, and Ricardo Yesares played important roles – was even much richer than César - inheriting a super-huge ranch (Rancho del Todo) in Coahuila in north Mexico, where she had to spend several months each year with her daughter (the formal heiress) to claim her rights. Around 1874 she gave birth to a son (Apostando su vida, original novel number 87).

=== Coyote's allies ===
Coyote had some interesting early allies (friends). Among the first (besides Julián) were the Lugones brothers – los Lugones (veterans from the battle of San Pasqual, Mallorqui spelt it Pascual) – Juan, Timoteo, Evilio, and Leocadio (originally four, but Leo was killed - in San Arcadia in the late 1860s, La Marca del "Cobra" - a highly ranked novel number 12), and there was the old Navajo Indian woman Adelia (aka Adela). She was working as a "spying" house keeper at the City Hall, and Coyote's contact with the Lugones. They helped Coyote from the very first beginning through all the years, and did not know about Coyote's real identity (until possibly very late).

Two other characters, though, knew the identity of Coyote (both very important and interesting ones - introduced in 1865, and a bit later) – Ricardo Yesares and Matias Alberes. Yesares (from Paso Robles in San Luis Obispo), Coyote's sub/double throughout the years from 1865 (who Coyote had saved from "unfair" hanging that year) debuted in El otro "Coyote", ediciones Cliper number 6 – the first adventure of Coyote's "second arrival". Ricardo was born around 1836 (Mallorqui noted him around 28–30 years old in 1965). He married Serena Morales (born circa 1842 - we know because Mallorqui presented her 22 years of age in early 1865) in Los Angeles around the time of Guadalupe's first pregnancy circa 1870. Ricardo had become the owner of Posada (inn) del Rey Don Carlos III, (Coyote's new and "secret headquarters") in 1865. The "two" Coyotes became really true private friends (and so did Guadalupe and Serena).

Coyote's closest allied in his "second term" was César's - and Guadalupe's - deeply loyal servant (and "bodyguard") Matias Alberes. He originally appeared in novel number 11 (El hijo del Coyote) and in the Extra volume El precio del Coyote and was a mute (his tongue had been cut) Yaqui Indian (who Coyote probably connected with in Sonora during his second absence from Los Angeles). Alberes sometimes acted as a third Coyote, and was a Coyote allied at least up to around 1874 – he was featured with Pedro Bienvenido in Los apuros de don César (novel number 59).

Gunman Mario Lujan, who initially was an enemy of Coyote in Al servicio del Coyote (number 22) helped him several times in this and later novels (and ended up as foreman at the San Antonio ranch). César Jr (the heir of the Acevedo ranch) had two good friends in Joao da Silveira and César de Guzmán. He met them in around late 1872 (El Cuervo en la pradera, number 53). The skilled Indian Pedro Bienvenido de la Guardia (who was some kind of mind-reader, and later performed some magic tricks with a couple of Chinese at the San Antonio parties) became an important allied of Coyote and his son César de Echagüe y Acevedo. He entered the scene in La reina del valle, number 56, with saving the life of Jr - and also appeared in the prequel, number 55 (Tres plumas negras). Those stories did introduce Analupe de Monreal. She also was featured in several future stories as half enemy/half friend.

=== Other early Coyote characters ===
Several of the novels' characters appeared throughout the series. Among them, Fray Jacinto at the mission station San Juan de Capistrano, who knew of Coyote's identity (and tried to get César to marry Lupe – he was the only one knowing Julián's true background. He also encouriged Coyote to let Jr know of his father's double identity. Fray Jacinto was murdered in late 1872 (in Los servidores del circulo verde, number 45). Later there was Fray Anselmo at San Benito de Palermo. Don Goyo Paz fought in the Mexican–American War and was a ranch owner not too far from San Antonio – los Lugones were hired bodyguards at Don Goyo's, whose son Gregorio Paz was to marry Guadalupe, but "El Diablo" forced César to marry her instead. There were solicitor José Covarrubias, doctor Garcia Oviedo, and Los Angeles sheriff Teodomiro Mateos – sheriff twice (from late 1865 up to the 1870s and shortly also later in the 1870s), and in later years one of César's best friends. Of those three at least Oviedo knew the identity of Coyote from 1871 (Rapto).

Former civil war spy Ginevra St. Clair appeared around the late 1860s (El exterminio de la Calavera, number 9, where César fell in love with her, but she was killed). It is considered one of the most appreciated novels in the series. There also were three more adventurers who appeared in several novels – Chris "Diamonds" Wardell, "El Diablo" (Juan Nepomuceno Mariñas - later known as Roberto Cifuentes), and "Princess Irina" (Odile Garson – she debuted in Otra lucha, number 13, in early 1870, and soon tried to charm César, but ended up as the partner of "El Diablo" after César's marriage). All three started out as some kind of enemies of Coyote. Anita was Guadalupe's maiden, Sagrario was her children's care-taker, and San Francisco chief vigilante Captain Farrell became a good friend of Coyote. Another noble ranch owner was Don Rómulo Hidalgo (with his son Justo – his father was murdered around 1871). In the novels there were of course also a lot of villains – Coyote's worst and toughest enemy probably was Robert Toombs (featured in Guadalupe, original Cliper novel number 47 and its sequels, telling stories of around 1872). Several novels were adventures with sequels (one special long series was Coyote's adventures featuring Analupe de Monreal in 1872-1873).

== Movies ==
- El Coyote, 1955 Spain & Mexico starring Mexican Abel Salazar (shot 1954)
- La justicia del Coyote (The Coyote's justice), 1956 Spain & Mexico with Abel Salazar (also shot 1954)
- El vengador de California (The avenger of California) – in Italy aka Il segno del Coyote (The sign of Coyote), in Brazil and Portugal as A Marca do Coyote, (also on DVD), 1963 Italy & Spain starring Mexican actor Fernando Casanova
- La vuelta de El Coyote (The return of El Coyote), 1998 Spain starring José Coronado (made in 1997). aka La vuelta del Coyote (often listed as a Portugal film), and aka El Coyote – La Pelicula (the movie). This movie was followed by two TV episodes.

== Comics and radio ==
El Coyote had a comic series adaptation in Spain, Cliper comics – 189 volumes plus (or including) at least six Almanacs and one special issue, all written by Jose Mallorquí (with illustrations by Francisco Batet in the first 113 or 128 (those 113 also issued in a glued hardbound series of four volumes) from 1947 up into 1953, and the last issues in 1954-1955 (by 1953 Batet had moved to France) – plus a late revival 1983 on Comics Forum, (24 nice volumes, plus 8 bound albums) and even later Batet's originals on Agualarga hardbound. There was also a long-running Spanish radio series on SER with around 100 episodes, featuring Vicente Mullor. Cliper published the first four calendars (1946-1949) plus more; 490 picture cards, plus 234 collectable character stickers with an album in 1946. Later even postage stamps were issued.
