= Michael S. Moore (comics) =

American comic book writer (born 1974)

- Born: Stuart Moore; May 5, 1974 (age 52) Cookeville, Tennessee
- Area: Comic book writer

Michael Stuart Moore (born May 5, 1974, in Cookeville, Tennessee) is an American comic book writer.

== Biography ==
=== Career ===
Moore was born in Cookeville, Tennessee with both African-American and Brazilian ancestry. He took an early interest in writing and has read comics since he was seven years old. He began to write and submit stories to Eclipse Comics while still in high school, which were never published. Moore found success in 1997 after being signed on as a writer for Azteca Productions, and wrote and co-plotted the first issue of the Team Tejas series. He later became the writer for the new El Gato Negro series, El Gato Negro: Nocturnal Warrior, in a three-part story-arc entitled, "Legacy".

== See also ==
- P.A.C.A.S.
