= El Gato Negro (comic book) =

- Cover of El Gato Negro #1 (October 1993); Art by Dave Kramer

Publication information
- Publisher: Azteca Productions
- Publication date: 1993 - 1996
- No. of issues: 4
- Main character(s): El Gato Negro

Creative team
- Created by: Richard Dominguez
- Written by: Richard Dominguez
- Artist(s): Richard Dominguez; Dave Kramer; Omar Mediano

El Gato Negro (The Black Cat) was an independent comic book series featuring the eponymous character created by Richard Dominguez and published by Azteca Productions. The series began in October 1993; the first edition sold all 5,000 copies within two months, but was placed on a seven-year hiatus after the fourth issue was published. Dominguez later returned in 2005 with the new series El Gato Negro: Nocturnal Warrior.

== Premise ==
The events in "El Gato Negro" occur in South Texas, specifically within the Lower Rio Grande Valley area, where social worker Francisco "Pancho" Guerrero is motivated by the gruesome murder of his best friend by drug-traffickers, to fight crime under the guise of El Gato Negro. He is assisted in his goals by his grandfather Agustin Guerrero and several other supporting characters.

== Storylines ==
=== Unknown Passing, Unforgettable Return ===
The first of the self-titled series published in 1993 under Dominguez's own Azteca Productions imprint. The identity El Gato Negro is in fact Francisco Guerrero, grandson of the original El Gato Negro, and heir to his legacy. Francisco adopted the identity of the El Gato Negro shortly after the murder of his friend Mario Bustamonte. Despite being popular with the citizens of his community, El Gato Negro is constantly being hunted by police Captain Miguel Bustamonte, Francisco's best friend and Mario's older brother. Miguel believes El Gato Negro is in league with the drug-smugglers that plague South Texas and was probably involved in the murder of his younger brother. While out on patrol one night as El Gato Negro, Francisco discovers two escaped convicts. Incapacitating the criminals, El Gato Negro has unknowingly stumbled across a drug-running conspiracy formed by the drug-smuggler known only as El Graduado and a mysterious South American crime organization known as The Annulus. El Gato Negro is later lured in to a trap set by El Graduado personally in an abandoned warehouse.

=== The Burning ===
(Also known as "Unknown Passing, Unforgettable Return part two") Continues immediately after the events in the first issue. In the ensuing struggle with El Graduado, El Gato Negro manages to destroy the abandoned warehouse containing large quantities of narcotics. Later Francisco discovers the identity of El Graduado to be that of Armando Ochoa, son of Ignacio Ochoa the undisputed drug lord of South Texas, a position Armando desires to take over in order to earn a seat with The Annulus.

=== Mexican Standoff ===
(Also known as "Unknown Passing, Unforgettable Return part three") The finale of the original three-part story arc. In a final confrontation with El Graduado, the villain had the upper-hand until the arrival of the original El Gato Negro and the Texas Rangers. While fleeing the scene, Armando inadvertently runs into Captain Bustamonte. Recognizing him to be the brother of the border patrolman his henchmen had murdered several months earlier, Ochoa resolves to kill the Miguel as well. Francisco manages to intervene, saving Miguel, and allows El Graduado to be taken in by the authorities. Afterward, Sheriff Bustamonte's opinion of El Gato Negro changes for the better but he continues to hunt for the hero regardless, believing his methods to be dangerous.

=== Enter: The Dogs of War ===
In retaliation, the Annulus enlists the aid of Boss Ochoa's nephews, two ruthless mercenaries from Corpus Christi, Texas. Nearly killing the costumed-crimefighter, El Gato Negro manages to escape from the two, only to collapse in the arms of his grandfather, Agustin Guerrero, suffering from extreme fatigue and near-intracranial injury.

== El Graduado ==
El Graduado
- Cover to El Gato Negro #3 featuring El Graduado; Pencils by Richard Dominguez, Color by Omar Mediano

Publication information
- Publisher: Azteca Productions
- First appearance: El Gato Negro #1
- Created by: Richard Dominguez

In-story information
- Alter ego: Armando Ochoa
- Abilities: Superb hand-to-hand combatant Skilled in use of bladed weapons Expert martial artist High intelligence Master tactician and strategist

Armando Ochoa, also known as El Graduado, is a fictional character and comic book supervillain in the series. The character made his first appearance in El Gato Negro #1 (October 1993). Son of the successful South Texas businessman and drug-lord Boss Ochoa, El Graduado vies to usurp his father’s throne and earn a seat in a criminal organization known as The Annulus. Earning the nickname of El Graduado, The Graduate, after graduating from a prestigious Ivy League University in the United States, El Graduado has proven himself to be a powerful adversary of high intellect and superb fighting ability.

Dominguez described the character as a "spoiled rich brat" who despite being a very educated person, chose to invest in corruption. El Graduado is also shown to have little regard for human life, easily murdering his own henchmen for their failures, and has admitted to enjoying the power of wielding a sniper rifle.

Raised entirely by his father, Boss Ochoa spared no expense on his son's education by sending him to the finest schools in the world. Armando attended a University in Bogotá where he developed a romantic relationship with fellow student Narcilina Montoya, with whom he later studied in Harvard Law. Armando later traveled orient, where he studied amongst the most prestigious martial arts schools.

In the "Unknown Passing, Unforgettable Return" storyline from El Gato Negro #1-3, Armando wants to replace his father as the prominent druglord in South Texas, Armando adopted the pseudonym of El Graduado. In order to impress the Annulus, El Graduado attempts to make a large drug trafficking deal. After being foiled at every turn by El Gato Negro, he resolved to kill the vigilante or risk embarrassment. In a final confrontation with El Gato, the villain had the upper-hand until the arrival of the Texas Rangers. El Graduado was arrested, leaving his father to answer to the wrath of the Annulus.

1997's "Enter: The Dogs of War!" storyline mentioned El Graduado awaiting trial in Houston. In retaliation against El Gato Negro, Boss Ochoa enlists his nephews to assassinate El Gato Negro. In the ongoing "Legacy" storyline from El Gato Negro: Nocturnal Warrior #1-3 El Graduado is shown to be released from jail and executing rival mob bosses.

== Graphic Novel ==
El Gato Negro
- Cover of El Gato Negro, Nocturnal Warrior #1 (November 2005); Art by Efren Molina

Publication information
- Publisher: Azteca Productions
- Format: Ongoing series
- Publication date: 2005 - Present
- Main character(s): El Gato Negro

Creative team
- Created by: Richard Dominguez
- Written by: Richard Dominguez; Michael S. Moore
- Artist(s): Efren Molina; Richard Dominguez
- Penciller(s): Efren Molina
- Inker(s): Richard Dominguez

Shortly after the publishing the fourth issue of El Gato Negro, the series went on hiatus for seven years, ending the series with a cliffhanger. El Gato Negro later returned in 2005 in the new on-going series El Gato Negro: Nocturnal Warrior #1. Created by Richard Dominguez and published under his own Azteca Productions imprint, the series began in November 2005. It was being compiled online at webcomicsnation.com

"Nocturnal Warrior" takes place in South Texas, where the communities of the Lower Rio Grande Valley are constantly threatened by gangs, drug runners, and costumed criminals. In an effort to fight and prevent crime, social worker Francisco "Pancho" Guerrero adopts his grandfather's former identity as El Gato Negro, promising to "bring bad luck to all those who do evil". Unlike most superheroes, El Gato Negro possesses no superpowers and instead makes use of his own athletic abilities, accumulative knowledge, detective skills to fight crime. He is assisted in his war on crime by several supporting characters including his grandfather, Agustin Guerrero. In the eyes of the general public, El Gato Negro is known as a living legend and watchful protector of South Texas but despite his best efforts is constantly hunted by the local law enforcement agencies and demonized by the media as a public menace.

== In other media ==
=== Film adaptation ===
As of January 2016, Richard Dominguez is currently working with writer-turned-director Michael S. Moore in directing and filming a live-action short-film adaptation titled El Gato Negro: Prey.

=== Television adaptation ===
In February 2019, Deadline Hollywood reported that MGM Television is developing an El Gato Negro television series, with Diego Boneta starring and executive producing the series through his production company Three Amigos, and with Joel Novoa co-executive producing. In September 2019, Robert Rodriguez joined the project to direct and executive produce, with the series originally set to be on Apple TV+.

In February 2024, Amazon Prime Video (which owns MGM) greenlit the series, now titled El Gato, for production in the spring of 2024.

== See also ==
- El Gato Negro
