= J. Mallorquí =

Spanish writer (1913–1972)

José Mallorquí y Figuerola
- Born: José Mallorquí y Figuerola; 12 February 1913; Barcelona, Spain
- Died: 7 November 1972 (aged 59); Madrid, Spain
- Occupation: Writer
- Spouse: Leonor del Corral y Abuín
- Children: Eduardo and César
- Writing career
- Pen name: José Mallorquí Figuerola, José Mallorquí, J. Mallorquí, Leonor del Corral, Martin Blair, J. F. Campos, P. J. Carr, E. Carrel, J. Carter, Amadeo Conde, León Coppel, Bruce Dolsen, Carlos Enríquez, E. Mallory Ferguson, J. Figueroa Campos, José Antonio de Figueroa, J. E. Granada, A. Guardiola, Enrique Guzmán Prado, J. Hill, Leland R. Kitchell, Juan Montoro, Carter Mulford, J. North, Ray Pennell, A. Sloane, Clarence D. Taylor, and, A. M. Torre
- Language: Spanish language

José Mallorquí y Figuerola (12 February 1913 – 7 November 1972) was a prolific Spanish writer under over 30 pseudonyms of hundreds of novellas by various popular genres. As J. Mallorquí he is internationally known for his 192 books' series El Coyote. Several of his works have been adapted for cinema.

== Biography ==
José Mallorquí y Figuerola was born on 12 February 1913 in Barcelona, Spain, he was son of Eulalia Mallorquí y Figuerola, and José Serra y Farré, who didn't recognize him. He was educated in boarding schools until the age of 14.

In 1931, at 18, his mother died and he inherited, which allowed him not to work. In 1933, he started to work as translator for French and English (which he didn't know how to pronounce).

On 23 December 1936, he married Leonor del Corral y Abuín, who died on 1 June 1971 from a bone cancer. He started to published his novellas with a variety of pseudonyms: José Mallorquí Figuerola, José Mallorquí, J. Mallorquí, Leonor del Corral, Martin Blair, J. F. Campos, P. J. Carr, E. Carrel, J. Carter, Amadeo Conde, León Coppel, Bruce Dolsen, Carlos Enríquez, E. Mallory Ferguson, J. Figueroa Campos, José Antonio de Figueroa, J. E. Granada, A. Guardiola, Enrique Guzmán Prado, J. Hill, Leland R. Kitchell, Juan Montoro, Carter Mulford, J. North, Ray Pennell, A. Sloane, Clarence D. Taylor, and A. M. Torre. He wrote various genres, from the western that made him famous to suspense, fantasy or romance. He committed suicide shooting himself on 7 November 1972 in her home in Madrid, afflicted by diabetes, arthrosis and the depression from the death of Leonor. He wrote "No puedo más. Me mato. En el cajón de mi mesa hay cheques firmados. Papá. Perdón".

He was the father of the also writers Eduardo Mallorquí and César Mallorquí. Eduardo committed suicide on 16 March 2001 after ingesting barbiturates.

== Works ==
Mallorquí wrote hundreds of novellas and several popular series: El Coyote, Los Bustamante, 3 hombres buenos, Jíbaro, Lorena Harding, Adelita, Duke, La Doña, Capitán Pablo Rido, and Lee Terrell.
