= Azteca Productions =

American comic book publisher

- Industry: Comics
- Founded: 1993
- Headquarters: Dallas, Texas
- Key people: Richard Dominguez; Olga Dominguez
- Website: Aztecaproductions.com

Azteca Productions is an American comic book publisher and imprint founded by comics creator Richard Dominguez in 1993. The company's first publication was El Gato Negro #1 showcasing the debut of the eponymous character, in what is now considered the company's flagship series. Publications went on hiatus during the rise and fall of the speculative market in the late 1990s until Dominguez returned in 2004.

== History ==
Azteca Productions' first publication was El Gato Negro #1 (October, 1993) featuring the first appearance of the character of the same name. The series was critically acclaimed, allowing Dominguez to pursue a four-part story arc. The publication of El Gato Negro was later followed with the superhero group Team Tejas in 1997. Shortly after, all publications came to a halt during the late 1990s, in which several independent publishers went out of business. Dominguez would later return in 2004 with a new El Gato Negro series with writer Michael S. Moore and artist Efren Molina. The company currently has several different titles in development including a revival of Judge Margarito Garza's Relampago!

== Notable titles ==
- The Acolyte, Demon Hunter
- El Gato Negro
- El Gato Negro, Nocturnal Warrior
- Lucha Grande
- Team Tejas
