= Team Tejas =

Fictional superhero team

- Team Tejas #1; Cover art by Randy Saffle

Publication information
- Publisher: Azteca Productions
- First appearance: Team Tejas #1
- Created by: Richard Dominguez

In-story information
- Base(s): Dallas, Texas
- Member(s): Lonestarr; Reata; Calibre; Plainsman; Trinity

Team Tejas is a fictional superhero team created by Richard Dominguez and published by Azteca Productions. The group made its first appearance in Team Tejas #1, published in 1997. The comic follows the story of three super-powered mutants and their government appointed leader in their fight against crime and superpowered terrorists. All members of the group receive government checks for their efforts, making their vigilante activities legal.

== Characters ==
=== Lonestarr ===
Government appointed leader of Team Tejas. Lonestarr's true identity is that of Jonathan Gonzales, assistant mayor of Dallas, Texas and son of Senator Enrique Gonzales. Lonestarr has no superpowers, as all appointed leaders are intended to be normal humans, but wears a suit designed by Gonzales Industries granting him the ability to form a manipulative energy field and the ability to fly. Jonathan takes pride in the success of Team Tejas, but the government's ties to the group as well as the burden of leadership is slowly wearing on him.

==== Fictional character history ====
Jonathan Gonzales is the son of Senator Enrique Gonzales and assistant-mayor of Dallas, Texas making him the perfect candidate for the Hero Agency's newly formed superhero group of South Texas. Jonathan, being supplied a suit from Gonzales Industries, must lead four meta-humans in the fight against crime and rogue mutant terrorists. Despite taking pride in the efforts of the team, the burden of leadership is slowly beginning to wear on him.

==== Skills, abilities, and gadgets ====
Since all government-appointed leaders of superhero teams are normal humans, Lonestarr has no special powers of his own. He instead relies on his accumulative knowledge and access to advanced technology to accomplish his goals.

==== Costume ====
Lonestarr's suit was designed and constructed by Gonzales Industries specifically for his use. The suit gives him the ability to form a manipulative energy field which he can use to form barriers or fire concussive blasts. The suit grants him the power of flight as well.

=== Reata ===
Vanessa Castillo was born with the ability to teleport herself anywhere within a five-hundred-mile radius, along with people or objects weighing up to one ton. Vanessa and her brother Abel were tested at early ages for the "Hero Gene". Testing positive, both were promptly abducted by the INS and place in to the Hero Program. After thirteen years, both were allowed to reintegrate in to normal society, and were made members of Team Tejas. Donning the name of Reata, Vanessa proves herself to be a vital member of the team, but will often place herself in danger without considering the consequences.

==== Fictional character history ====
Discovered to have the "Hero gene" at the young age of six, Vanessa was abducted by the Hero Agency, an active branch of the government, and placed in to the Hero Program. After thirteen years of training by the Agency, Vanessa and her brother were allowed to return to regular society, on the condition that they both become members of Team Tejas. Both brother and sister accept their roles in the group, with Vanessa becoming a successful fashion designer. Vanessa proves herself a vital member of the group but often places herself in dangerous situations.

=== Calibre ===
Calibre's powers include super-strength and the ability to grow twenty feet tall, increasing his strength as he does so. Calibre is in fact Abel Castillo, a college student at Dallas University and defensive end for the football team. He, along with his older sister Vanessa, were taken in to the Hero Program at a young age to be released a few years later to fight crime with Team Tejas. Abel is characterized as a gentle giant, never quick to anger, but able to release a fury that only his sister can calm.

==== Fictional character history ====
Discovered at a young age to have the "Hero Gene" both Abel and his sister Vanessa were forcefully removed from their household and placed in the United States Government Hero Agency. After thirteen years of extensive training in the Hero Program, both brother and sister were allowed to return to regular society and stationed with Team Tejas. Donning the name Calibre, Abel and his team-mates are the first line of defense against terrorist meta-human attacks. Outside of his Team Tejas, Abel currently attends Dallas University and is a promising defensive end for the football team.

=== Plainsman ===
Daniel Brightfeather joined the Hero Program when he was eight years old, being forced from his reservation by the government. Although he surpassed the program's expectations, Daniel never forgot what they had done to him, and has a deep hatred for the government. Adopting the alternate identity of the Plainsman, Daniel is stationed with Team Tejas. The Plainsman has the unique ability to control "magical" artifacts or weapons of great power, one including the Tomahawk Crow which can turn in to a fireball when thrown and return to the Plainsman. Despite his dislike of the government, Daniel has a deep respect for his teammates, seeing them as forced in to the group as he himself was. The Hero Agency is worried that The Plainsman's outspoken views may affect Lonestarr, and take special care to monitor both heroes.

==== Character history ====
Daniel Brightfeather was found to have the ability to control and manipulate reputed magical objects at the early age of eight. The INS quickly abducted the young boy and placed him in the Hero Program. Despite consistently surpassing the Agency's own expectations, Daniel has a deep hatred for the government. Despite his dislike of the government, Daniel has a deep respect for his teammates, seeing them as forced into the group as he himself was. The Hero Agency is worried that The Plainsman's outspoken views may affect the team's leader Lonestarr, and take special care to monitor both heroes.

=== Trinity ===
Born Zhang Xianhua, Trinity is an immigrant from China who was "traded" to the United States Hero Agency, and sent to live with a trainer in Ouray, Colorado until she was of appropriate age to enter the Hero Program. Trinity has the power to create up to three clones of herself, each stronger and faster than herself, and can act independently for up to fifty-miles from Zhang. Her unique ability does come with side effects, as each clone has a part of her personality multiplied by one hundred percent. Zhang attends college with Abel but has no ambitions of her own. Often moody and defiant, Trinity has become hard to control and harder to predict. Despite being an annoyance to Lonestarr, Plainsman often acts as her mentor and father-figure.

==== Fictional character history ====
Zhang was discovered by the Chinese government to have the reputed "Hero Gene" at an early age and was quickly apprehended to be "traded" in to the United States Hero Agency for some undisclosed item. Due to her young age, the girl was placed in the care of a "trainer" in Ouray, Colorado, until appropriate testing could begin. Despite failing to pass any of the Hero Program's rigorous testings, Zhang is currently stationed with Team Tejas and is a college student attending Dallas University. A rather defiant character, Trinity easily annoys her teammates, except for Plainsman who acts as her mentor.

==== Powers and abilities ====
Trinity has superhuman strength and the ability to self-duplicate up to three clones. Each clone has double her original strength and are able to act independently from up to fifty-miles away from each other. Her unique ability is not without its side-effects, as each clone retains a certain part of her personality multiplied by 100%.
