= Richard Dominguez =

American comics artist

- Dominguez inking the latest issue of El Gato Negro: Nocturnal Warrior
- Born: Eufrancio Richard Dominguez; September 22, 1960 (age 66) Dallas, Texas, U.S.
- Areas: Writer, Artist, Editor
- Notable works: El Gato Negro; Team Tejas

Richard Dominguez (born Eufrancio Ricardo Dominguez September 22, 1960) is an American comic book artist and freelance storyboard illustrator. Best known for creating the popular series El Gato Negro, Dominguez publishes his comics through his imprint and art studio, Azteca Productions. Dominguez also is well known for influencing other artists and creators in the pursuit of their own self-publishing ventures.

== Biography ==
=== Early life and career ===
Richard Dominguez was born Eufrancio Ricardo Dominguez to Ricardo and Juanita Dominguez in Dallas, Texas on September 22, 1960. The second of seven children, Richard grew up in a section of West Dallas known during the Great Depression as 'The Devil's Back Porch'. Dominguez recalls his first exposure to comic books at the age of six when he began sneaking into his Uncle's room to read from his large comic book collections. In high school, Richard enrolled in Commercial Art and later took Life Drawing classes at a community college before taking a job at a local supermarket chain to create and paint point-of-purchase displays. During the late '80s and early '90s, Richard worked as an intern for several art and design studios, later designing logos for Semi-Pro Sports teams and small companies.

=== Creation of El Gato Negro ===
El Gato Negro made his debut in El Gato Negro #1 (October 1993). Cover art by Dave Kramer.

Dominguez conceived El Gato Negro sometime in the mid-to-late '80s and originally planned to debut the character in a largely Mexican-American superhero group called Team Tejas. Having placed more emphasis on El Gato Negro's character development than the other members, Dominguez abandoned the Team Tejas project for a later date, as he later recalled:

El Gato Negro was created or "born" when I was sketching on my notebook paper and in binders during (when I was supposed to be taking notes) classes in a community college...He was originally supposed to be a member of an all-Hispanic superhero group which I called "Team Tejas". I later became partial [to] this particular character and put my emphasis on him and put the rest of the team in the "backburner".

Various aspects of the character's personality and visual design were directly inspired by some of Dominguez's favorite comic book and classic pulp superheroes including The Spirit, The Crimson Avenger, Daredevil, Nightwing, The Shadow, The Phantom, Zorro and most noticeably Batman. Elements from Japanese animation, manga, and martial arts films also aided in the development of El Gato Negro's costume design and equipment.

The example of Judge Margarito Garza's Relampago character persuaded Dominguez pursue his creation in a self-published format, the character making his first published appearance in his own self-titled series written and illustrated by Dominguez in 1993. The debut series proved popular and has since spawned a second series entitled "El Gato Negro: Nocturnal Warrior". The character's popularity has landed him guest-starring roles in several publications and other media including being featured in Mountain Dew's "Do the Dew" Tour. Dominguez is currently in talks for a possible live-action film adaptation.

=== Azteca Productions ===
Dominguez formed Azteca Productions in 1993, its first publication featuring the debut of El Gato Negro, in what is now considered the company's flagship title. Dominguez later debuted Team Tejas with the help of friend and writer Michael S. Moore in 1997. Publications were put to a halt during the rise and fall of the speculative market of the late '90s, allowing Dominguez to focus on his family life. He later returned in 2004 with a second series featuring Moore as writer and pencils by artist Efren Molina. Current projects include Lucha Grande Comics featuring the exploits of the original El Gato Negro, [The Acolyte, Demon Hunter]and Tonatiuh the Almighty.

=== Personal life ===
Richard currently resides in Dallas, Texas with his wife Olga Dominguez and their four children.

== Professional Amigos of Comic Art Society ==
The Professional Amigos of Comic Art Society (PACAS) was a non-profit organization founded by comic book creators Richard Dominguez, Carlos Saldaña, Jose Martinez, and Fernando Rodriguez in 1995. The purpose of which was to unite various cartoonists, writers, colorists, letterers and publishers in the shared goal of using networking and dialogue between themselves in order to assist their various projects in the hopes of expanding the opportunities for social growth in the comic art community. The group later expanded to over fifty members, the majority of which lived in California, but also included international members such as Oscar Loyo and the ¡Ka-Boom! Estudio group from Mexico.
