= Slugs (1988 film) =

1988 horror film by Juan Piquer Simón

Slugs, Muerte Viscosa
- Spanish theatrical release poster
- Directed by: Juan Piquer Simón
- Screenplay by: Ron Gantman; Juan Piquer Simón
- Based on: Slugs by Shaun Hutson
- Produced by: José Antonio Escrivá; Francesca DeLaurentiis; Juan Piquer Simón
- Starring: Michael Garfield; Kim Terry
- Cinematography: Julio Bragado
- Edited by: Richard Rabjohn; Antonio Gimeno
- Music by: Tim Souster
- Production company: Dister Films
- Distributed by: Dister Group; New World Pictures
- Release dates: 5 February 1988 (United States); 16 September 1988 (Spain)
- Running time: 89 minutes
- Country: Spain
- Language: English

Slugs, also referred to as Slugs: The Movie (Spanish: Slugs, Muerte Viscosa, lit. "Slugs, Slimy Death") is a 1988 English-language Spanish natural horror film directed by Juan Piquer Simón, and co-written by Simon with Ron Gantman. Based on the 1982 novel of the same name by Shaun Hutson, it tells the story of a small town whose locals are terrorised by aggressive carnivorous slugs.

== Plot ==
In the fictional small town of Ashton, an alcoholic named Ron Bell is eaten alive late one night by a large swarm of carnivorous slugs in his living room. The following day, health inspector and sewer manager Mike Brady and Sheriff Reese head to Ron's home, preparing to deliver an eviction notice, only to discover his near-skinless body. Exploring the house, Mike finds multiple trails of slime leading from the basement, but he and Reese are unable to determine what exactly happened to Ron. Later that day, Mike and his friend and co-worker Don Palmer are called in to fix a blockage in the sewers, where Don discovers several animal carcasses stuck in the pipes.

Meanwhile, local gardener Harold Morris puts on a gardening glove which, unbeknownst to him, has a slug hiding within, which starts eating his hand. As he thrashes about in pain, Harold accidentally knocks over some of his chemical jars, causing a fire which ignites a tank of gasoline, resulting in an explosion that kills him and his wife Jean. Upon returning home, Mike is informed of the deaths by his wife Kim, a high school teacher. They then both discover a group of abnormally large and aggressive slugs in their garden. Mike gathers some of the slugs in a jar and leaves them with the school's science teacher John Foley for investigation. During his investigations, Foley witnesses one of the slugs attack and eat the class hamster. Elsewhere in town, the slugs attack and eat two teenagers, and Mike's friend David unknowingly eats part of a slug that was hidden in a salad made by his wife.

Mike and Reese are brought in to investigate the deaths of the teenagers the next morning, where Mike postulates that the slugs are responsible for the murders, only to be disregarded as crazy. Later, Mike is called over by Don, who has discovered that the locations of the murders line up with the layout of the town's sewer system. Don theorises that the slug's aggressiveness may be a result of chemicals being leaked into the sewer from a long-abandoned toxic waste dump that exists close by to the town.

Meanwhile, whilst dining at a restaurant, an unwell David begins profusely bleeding from his nose and collapses, before multiple blood flukes abruptly burst from his eye sockets. Having learned of the death and witnessed slugs crawling through the sink in his own home, Mike approaches the town mayor, begging him to cut off the downtown water supply so that the slugs can be dealt with, but is once again dismissed as crazy, causing him to leave in frustration. Later, at the school lab, Foley shows Mike a lithium-based arsenic that Mike hopes to use to kill the slugs in the sewers, which he has discovered are the slugs' place of origin. Mike convinces Don to join him in helping getting rid of the slugs, as Foley creates a large batch of the arsenic. That night, Mike and Don enter the sewer system and locate the slugs' breeding ground, but Don accidentally falls in and is eaten alive. Mike then climbs out of a nearby manhole and gets Foley to pump in the arsenic from a firetruck hose into the sewer, causing an explosive reaction that successfully destroys the slugs, despite causing serious damage to the rest of the town in the process. Mike reunites with Kim as the emergency services arrive. It is revealed that, unbeknownst to the town's inhabitants, a single slug has survived the explosion.

== Cast ==
- Michael Garfield Levine as Mike Brady (credited as Michael Garfield, dubbed by Ramón Langa; uncredited)
- Kim Terry as Kim Brady (dubbed by María del Puy; uncredited)
- Philip MacHale as Don Palmer (dubbed by Diego Martín; uncredited)
- Concha Cuetos as Maria Palmer
- Glen Greenberg as Danny Palmer
- Jay R. Ingerson as Ricky Palmer
- Emilio Linder as David Watson (dubbed by Antonio Esquivas; uncredited)
- Alicia Moro as Maureen Watson (dubbed by Paloma Escola; uncredited)
- John Battaglia as Sheriff Reese (dubbed by Félix Acaso; uncredited)
- Santiago Álvarez as John Foley (dubbed by Carlos del Pino; uncredited)
- Manuel de Blas as Mayor Eaton (dubbed by Javier Franquelo; uncredited)
- Kari Rose as Donna Moss (dubbed by Ángela González; uncredited)
- Kris Mann as Bobby Talbot (dubbed by Luis Reina; uncredited)
- Juan Maján as Harold Morris (dubbed by Manuel Torremocha; uncredited)
- Lucía Prado as Jean Morris (dubbed by Pilar Gentil; uncredited)
- Frank Braña as Frank Phillips (dubbed by Antonio Iranzo; uncredited)
- Andy Alsup as Officer Dobbs (dubbed by Gonzalo Durán; uncredited)
- Stan Schwartz as Ron Bell (dubbed by Teófilo Martínez; uncredited)
- Harriet L. Stark as Florence Fortune (dubbed by Matilde Conesa; uncredited)
- Patty Shepard as Sue Channing (dubbed by Matilde Conesa; uncredited)
- Miguel de Grandy as Mr. Riggs (dubbed by Antonio Fernández; uncredited)
- Tammy Reger as Pam (dubbed by Marta García; uncredited)
- Toby Gold as Dino
- Nazzareno Natale as Chef (credited as Nazareno Natale, dubbed by José Moratalla; uncredited)
- Carla M. Fox as Julie
- Isabel Prinz as Mayor Eaton's Secretary
- Laura Notario as Frank's Secretary
- Daniel L. Johns as Teenager #1 (dubbed by Rafael Alonso Naranjo Jr.; uncredited)
- Kristin L. Kilian as Girl #1 (dubbed by Pilar Coronado; uncredited)
- Edward Trathen as Teenager #2
- Eric Swanson as Boy in Boat (credited as Erik Swanson, dubbed by Rafael Alonso Naranjo Jr.; uncredited)
- Karen Landberg as Girl in Boat (dubbed by Marta García; uncredited)
- Aníbal Blas as Waiter (dubbed by Luis Marín; uncredited)
- Laramie G. Evans as Mr. Moss
- Nevada Killips as Mrs. Moss (credited as Neveda Killips)
- Larry Bornheimer as Policeman #1
- Wally Frazer as Ambulance Driver
- Silvana Mangano as Diner (uncredited)
- Rafael Torres as Radio Announcer (uncredited)

== Production ==
=== Filming ===
Slugs was produced by Dister Films in Spain and the United States in 1987, with the setting of the film changed from Britain to America. Production was supervised by Larry Ann Evans, who had grown up in Lyons, New York and moved to Madrid to become a filmmaker and work with Juan Piquer Simón as an assistant. Interior scenes were shot in studios in Madrid, while exterior scenes were shot in Lyons. Frank LaLoggia's film Lady in White was also being filmed in Lyons at the time.

=== Casting ===
Actors and actresses cast for the film included Michael Garfield Levine, Kim Terry, Philip MacHale, Concha Cuetos, Glen Greenberg, Jay R. Ingerson, Emilio Linder, Alicia Moro, John Battaglia, Santiago Álvarez, Manuel de Blas, Kari Rose, Kris Mann, Juan Maján, Lucía Prado, Frank Braña, Andy Alsup, Stan Schwartz, Harriet L. Stark, Patty Shepard, Miguel de Grandy, Tammy Reger, Toby Gold, Nazzareno Natale, Carla M. Fox, Isabel Prinz, Laura Notario, Daniel L. Johns, Kristin L. Kilian, Edward Trathen, Eric Swanson, Karen Landberg, Aníbal Blas, Laramie G. Evans, Nevada Killips, Larry Bornheimer, Wally Frazer, Silvana Mangano, and Rafael Torres. Linder and Braña had worked with Simón on Where Time Began, Supersonic Man, Pieces and Extra Terrestrial Visitors. The cast and crew members had high praise for Simón, stating that he ran a relaxed set and they were always feeling at ease. Many of the Spanish and Italian actors spoke in their native language on set, which required English-dubbed voiceovers for the international release, done in London. The English-speaking actors had to re-dub their lines in post-production due to poor on-set sound recording. The dialogue and dubbing were edited by Alan Brett and mixed by Colin Martin, Nigel Edwards and Enrique Molinero.

=== Special effects ===
The special effects and makeup effects were supervised by Emilio Ruiz del Río and done by Basilio Cortijo, Carlo De Marchis, and Patrick Tantalo, with assistance from David Johnson and Roy Knyrim. Both real and fake slugs were used during production; the real ones were provided by Taramundi, the effect where a slug bites Mike Brady's finger was achieved via an arm-sized finger (operated by Evans) and a large puppet, and De Marchis used juvenile eels in some scenes (such as when David Watson dies) to emphasize the practical gore effects.

=== Music ===
The film's score was composed and conducted by Tim Souster and performed by the Royal Philharmonic Orchestra.

== Release ==
The film opened in the United States on 5 February 1988 and Spain on 16 September 1988. It was distributed by New World Pictures.

=== Critical reception ===
On review aggregator Rotten Tomatoes, the film holds a 38% approval rating based on 8 reviews.

Variety praised the "convincing special effects and make-up and snappy direction" and said it "has enough thrills and spills in it to keep youth audiences alert".

Shaun Hutson, the author of the original novel, disliked the film, due to its low-budget production, handling of the source material, and the dubbed voices. In later years, he developed a fondness for the film, considering it a "guilty pleasure".

=== Box office ===
The film flopped at the U.S. box office. It opened in seven theaters in the United States and grossed $15,842 in its opening weekend.

=== Awards ===
The film won a Goya Award for Best Special Effects by Gonzalo Gonzalo, Basilio Cortijo and Carlos de Marchis.

=== Home video ===
Anchor Bay Entertainment released a DVD of the film in 2000. In 2011, Image Entertainment released a DVD of the film under the Midnight Madness series. In 2016, British home video distributor Arrow Films released a special edition Blu-ray of the film, which contained a commentary track and interviews with several people associated with the film.
