= Nazzareno Natale =

Italian actor (1938–2006)

- Born: 4 April 1938; Acquaro, Calabria
- Died: 21 June 2006 (aged 68)
- Occupation: Actor

Nazzareno Natale (4 April 1938 – 21 June 2006) was an Italian actor.

He played Rojo Gang Member in Per un pugno di dollari, Paco in For a Few Dollars More (1965), and Bountyhunter in Il buono il bruto il cattivo (1966), by Sergio Leone, and Wylie in Taste for Killing (1966) and Wild Jack's Man in Day of Anger (1967), by Tonino Valerii. He also appeared in Giù La Testa (1971).

== Selected filmography ==
- A Fistful of Dollars (1964) as Rojo Gang Member (uncredited)
- For a Few Dollars More (1965) as Paco - Member of Indio's Gang (uncredited)
- Seven Guns for the MacGregors (1966) as Bandido (uncredited)
- Ringo, the Mark of Vengeance (1966) as Paco
- The Good, the Bad and the Ugly (1966) as Mexican Bounty Hunter (uncredited)
- Seven Pistols for a Massacre (1967)
- Death Rides a Horse (1967) as Bandito con Pedro
- Bang Bang Kid (1967) as Leather Worker
- Day of Anger (1967) as Wild Jack's Henchman
- Today We Kill, Tomorrow We Die! (1968) as Comanchero
- Ragan (1968)
- Villa Rides (1968) as Villista
- Serafino (1968) as Silio
- Death on High Mountain (1969)
- Sabata the Killer (1970) as Mexicano
- Come Have Coffee with Us (1970)
- Why? (1971) as Saverio
- Duck, You Sucker (1971) as Member of Juan's Family Blown Up by Dynamite
- Gang War in Naples (1972) as Capeca Henchman (uncredited)
- Roman Scandals '73 (1972) as Bruno
- Joe Petrosino (1972, TV Series) as Casalis
- The Age of the Medici (1973, TV Mini-Series)
- Those Dirty Dogs (1973) as Sergeant Ordered to Bathe (uncredited)
- Justicia para todos (1973) as Augusto - Mechanic
- Massacre in Rome (1973) as Partisan with glasses
- Teresa, la ladrona (1973) as Federico
- The Devil Is a Woman (1974) as Father Monaldi
- El contragolpe (1974) as Jim, a Confessor
- Los pecados de un ardiente varón (1974) as Bertinelli lo Stalliere
- The Voyage Into the Whirlpool Has Begun (1974) as Vanja
- Pupa, Charlie y su gorila (1975) as Frankie Bottles
- Il giustiziere di mezzogiorno (1975) as Netturbino
- 1900 (1979) as Peasant at Attila's execution
- Escuadra anti-robo (1979) as Venditore Cagnolini (uncredited)
- Messalina, Messalina (1977) as Matrullo (uncredited)
- Swindle (1977) as Tassista
- La patata caliente (1979) as Operaio
- Orient Express (1979, TV Mini-Series) as Le cuisinier
- Atsalut pader (1979)
- Pronto emergenza (1980, TV Series) as Ufficiale forestale
- The Cricket (1980) as Gandola
- La Cage aux Folles II (1980) as Demis
- Un eroe del nostro tempo (1982, TV Mini-Series) as Cesare
- Venise en hiver (1982, TV Movie) as Pagliero
- Slugs (1988) as Chef
- The Gamble (1988)
- A Season of Giants (1990, TV Movie) as Foreman
- Year of the Gun (1991) as Cop (uncredited)
- Desperate Crimes (1993) as Grocer
- L'ispettore Sarti - Un poliziotto, una città (1994, TV Series)
- Pazza famiglia (1995-1996, TV Series)
- The Sands of Time (1998, TV Movie) as Mushat
- Joseph Bonanno, la historia de un padrino (1999, TV Movie) as Don Vincenzo
- Don Matteo (2000, TV Series)
- Gangs of New York (2002) as Don Whiskerandos
- Raul - Diritto di uccidere (2005) (final film role)

== Bibliography ==
- Neibaur, James L. (12 March 2015). The Clint Eastwood Westerns. Rowman & Littlefield. p. 196. ISBN 9781442245044.
- Poppi, Roberto; Pecorari, Mario; Lancia, Enrico; Melelli, Fabio (2003). Dizionario del cinema italiano: Gli artisti. Gli attori dal 1930 ai giorni nostri. M - Z. Vol. 3. Gremese Editore. ISBN 9788884402691.
