= Frankenstein's Castle of Freaks =

- Theatrical release poster
- Directed by: Dick Randall
- Screenplay by: Mark Smith; William Rose; Roberto Spano; Mario Francini
- Produced by: Dick Randall; Oscar Brazzi
- Starring: Rosanno Brazzi; Michael Dunn; Edmund Purdom; Gordon Mitchell; William Russell
- Cinematography: Mario Mancini
- Edited by: Enzo Micarelli
- Music by: Marcello Gigante
- Production company: Classic Film International
- Distributed by: Nettunia Film
- Release date: 19 February 1974 (Italy)
- Running time: 89 minutes
- Country: Italy
- Box office: ₤51.004 million

Frankenstein's Castle of Freaks (Italian: Terror! Il castello delle donne maledette) is a 1974 Italian horror film.

== Plot summary ==
A Neanderthal man is lynched by villagers and Count Frankenstein brings the monster back to life. Trying to avoid detection from the authorities and the locals, his creation escapes and wreaks havoc.

== Cast ==
- Rossano Brazzi as Count Frankenstein
- Michael Dunn as Genz
- Edmund Purdom as Prefect Ewing
- Gordon Mitchell as Igor
- Loren Ewing as Goliath
- Luciano Pigozzi as Hans
- Xiro Papas as Kreegin
- Salvatore Baccaro as Ook (credited as Boris Lugosi)
- Eric Mann as Eric
- Laura De Benedittis as Vald
- Robert Marx as Koerner
- Christiane Rücker as Krista (credited as Christiane Royce)

== Production ==
Italian film critic and historian Roberto Curti stated that production details of the film were "shady if not contradictory". These include the identity of the director of the film. Among the different hypotheses of who directed the film included Spanish actor Ramiro Olvieros and producer Oscar Brazzi, cinematographer Mario Mancini, producer Dick Randall and screenwriter William Rose. The Italian copyright agency SIAE certified that director Robert H. Oliver was a pseudonym of Mancini. Actor Gordon Mitchell contradicts this, saying that the director was Robert Oliver, while the actress Simone Blondell recalled only that the director "spoke English, he wasn't Italian" Among the crew, assistant director Gianlorenzo Battaglia denied Mancini directed the film, stating that "the American director left the film because of disagreements with the producer, and so Mario finished it on his own. I'm not 100% sure though!"

The film was shot in late 1972 and finished in early 1973.

== Release ==
Frankenstein's Castle of Freaks was distributed theatrically in Italy by Nettunia Film on 19 February 1974. It grossed a total of 51,005,000 Italian lire on its domestic release. The film was released in the United States on Aquarius Releasing and Box-Office International Pictures in January 1975.

The film was released in the United States under various titles including Terror Castle, The House of Freaks, The Monsters of Dr. Frankenstein and Dr. Frankenstein's Castle of Freaks. It was released in the United Kingdom as Frankenstein's Castle. Curti described the film as having a minor cult status in the United States when it aired on Elvira's Movie Macabre in the 1980s.

== Reception ==
In a retrospective look on the film, Curti described it as "One of the trashiest horror movies produced in Italy in the 1970s". Louis Paul wrote a negative review of the film in his book Italian Horror Film Directors, opining that the film was "little more than low-budget horror at its worst".

== Footnotes ==
=== References ===
- Curti, Roberto (2017). Italian Gothic Horror Films, 1970–1979. McFarland. ISBN 978-1476629605.
- Paul, Louis (2005). Italian Horror Film Directors. McFarland. ISBN 978-0-7864-8749-3.
