= Don't Open till Christmas =

1984 film by Edmund Purdom

Don't Open Till Christmas
- Theatrical release poster
- Directed by: Edmund Purdom
- Written by: Derek Ford; Alan Birkinshaw (Note: Credited as 'Al McGoohan'.)
- Produced by: Dick Randall; Stephen Minasian
- Starring: Edmund Purdom; Alan Lake; Caroline Munro; Belinda Mayne; Gerry Sundquist; Mark Jones; Kevin Lloyd
- Cinematography: Alan Pudney
- Edited by: Ray Selfe
- Music by: Des Dolan
- Production company: Spectacular Trading International
- Distributed by: 21st Century Film Corporation
- Release dates: 7 December 1984 (U.S.); 19 December 1984 (U.K.)
- Running time: 86 minutes
- Country: United Kingdom
- Language: English

Don't Open Till Christmas is a 1984 British slasher film directed by Edmund Purdom, and starring Purdom, Caroline Munro, Alan Lake, Belinda Mayne, and Gerry Sundquist. Written by Derek Ford and Alan Birkinshaw, the film follows a mysterious killer murdering Santa Claus impersonators in London during Christmastime.

The production of Don't Open Till Christmas was troubled, with director and star Purdom eventually dropping out of the project, after which its editor, Ray Selfe, took over directorial duties to complete the film, while screenwriter Alan Birkinshaw performed significant rewrites of the screenplay. As a result, principal photography lasted nearly two years.

Don't Open Till Christmas was theatrically distributed in the United States through 21st Century Film Corporation, opening in New York City on 7 December 1984. This was the only directorial work of Purdom's career, and the final film of both Lake and Sundquist.

== Plot ==
A man in a Santa suit and a woman meet in an alleyway to have sex in a car, and are stabbed to death by a man wearing a grinning translucent mask. During a party, another man dressed like Santa Claus has a spear thrown through his head, and dies in front of his daughter, Kate Brioski. At Scotland Yard, Chief Inspector Ian Harris and Detective Sergeant Powell discuss the murders, and interview Kate, and her boyfriend Cliff. That night, another Santa is killed, having his face shoved onto the grill on which he was roasting chestnuts on an open fire.

The next day, a present (which reads "Don't Open Till Christmas") is delivered to Harris, Powell receives a strange call from a man claiming to be a reporter named Giles, and a Santa is shot in the mouth. Cliff tricks Kate into visiting a porn studio owned by an old friend, and after Kate storms off, Cliff and the model (who is adorned in a Santa cloak) prepare for outdoor photographs, but Cliff runs off when a pair of police officers spot them, and the model encounters the killer, who lets her go.

At a peep show, a Santa is knifed, which is witnessed by one of the strippers, Sherry Graham. Harris visits Kate and Cliff, and makes it clear that Cliff is a suspect in the attacks, due to being present for two of them. Powell finds Giles digging through his office, and tells him that the newspaper Giles stated he worked for claimed not to know him. Giles retorts by suggesting that Harris is hiding something, and that Powell should keep an eye on him. A Santa is assaulted by a group of teenagers, and runs into the London Dungeon, where he and an employee are killed.

In an effort to catch the murderer, several officers go undercover as Santas, and two of them are butchered at a carnival. The killer then abducts Sherry, intending for her to be "the supreme sacrifice to all the evil that Christmas is". Meanwhile, Harris is taken off the case, and when Kate calls him, she is informed by his housekeeper that he is visiting Parklands, a mental institution. A Santa is chased into a theatre where Caroline Munro is performing, and his body is brought to the stage by a trapdoor after he is stabbed in the face with a machete. Kate tells Powell of her suspicions about Harris (who has no birth certificate) but he dismisses her theories, so she goes to visit Parklands alone, while the killer castrates a Santa in a department store restroom.

Kate is confronted in her home by Giles, who she had learned was just released from Parklands, and is the younger brother of Harris (who changed his surname from Harrison after Giles was committed). Powell telephones Kate, and she tries to answer, but Giles strangles and stabs her. Powell hears Kate's death over the phone, rushes to Kate's apartment, and pursues Giles into a junkyard, where Giles electrocutes him.

Giles returns to his hideout, which he chases Sherry through when she escapes her chains. Sherry knocks Giles over a railing, and when she goes to inspect the body, Giles springs back to life, and begins throttling her. A flashback is then shown, and reveals that decades earlier Giles walked in on his father (who was dressed as Santa for a Christmas party) cheating on his mother with another woman. When Giles's mother discovered this, she and her husband got into an argument, which ended with Mrs. Harrison being knocked down a flight of stairs.

Harris wakes up from a nightmare, goes into his living room, and unwraps the gift he had gotten earlier, which has a previously unseen card that reads "Christmas present from your loving Brother". The present is a music box, which explodes after playing its song.

== Cast ==
- Edmund Purdom as Chief Inspector Ian Harris
- Alan Lake as Giles Harrison
- Belinda Mayne as Kate Briosky
- Gerry Sundquist as Cliff Boyd
- Mark Jones as Detective Sergeant Powell
- Kelly Baker as Sherry Graham, Experience Girl
- Caroline Munro as Herself
- Kevin Lloyd as Gerry
- Pat Astley as Sharon
- Wendy Danvers as Mrs. Sherry
- Laurence Harrington as Kate's Father
- Ken Halliwell as Restaurant Commissionaire
- Ray Marioni as Maitre d'hotel
- Wilfred Corlett as Experience Santa Claus
- Ricky Kennedy as Theatre Santa Claus
- Sid Wragg as Dungeon Santa Claus
- Max Roman as Store Santa Claus
- George Pierce as Market Santa Claus
- Ashley Dransfield as Drunken Santa Claus
- Derek Ford as Circus Santa Claus
- Adrian Black as Circus Santa Claus
- John Aston as Santa Claus In Car
- Maria Eldridge as Girl In Car
- Des Dolan as Detective Constable
- Derek Hunt as Police Constable
- Paula Meadows as Dungeon Secretary

== Production ==
The film notably had numerous production issues such as conflicts between the producers and director and star, Edmund Purdom.

Purdom, a former matinée idol-turned-character actor, had long resided in Rome, working in the Italian film industry. His involvement with the film began in 1981 during filming of Pieces, a Spanish-shot slasher film by American expatriate producers Dick Randall and Stephen Minasian, in which Purdom played the killer. Purdom agreed to star in the film, solely on the condition that he be allowed to direct it. Derek Ford, a veteran writer/director of sexploitation movies, wrote the original screenplay. The special makeup effects were created by Italian artist Pino Ferranti, who had worked with cult horror filmmakers Dario Argento and Lucio Fulci.

Principal photography began in December 1982 with Purdom as director. However, clashes between Purdom with Randall and Minasian almost immediately cause delays and scheduling issues, resulting in the production eventually spanning nearly two years. Eventually, Purdom quit the production and writer Derek Ford was hired to take over the directing, but he would be dismissed after only two days. The film's editor, Ray Selfe, was then hired afterwards to direct and Alan Birkinshaw was hired to rewrite the majority of the script.

Because of Purdom's departure, many scenes in the film had to be reshot or cut all together. Several characters were recast, since many original actors were not available to return for reshoots. Many of the Selfe and Birkinshaw's new scenes consisted of additional deaths, so that they could be shot without the principal cast. A key character named Dr. Bridle was removed from the film, despite his actor Nicholas Donnelly still being listed in the credits. The eventual final girl is only credited as 'Experience Girl' (supplementary material names her as 'Sherry Graham'). Her character, a stripper, was originally only present for a single kill scene, which was eventually re-shot twice (each time with different actresses), and under Selfe was expanded into the final girl.

A death scene where a Santa is killed by electrocution vis-a-vie Christmas lights was scrapped when the set caught fire. The London Dungeon sequence was filmed twice to add more gore. The management were so upset by the film crew's conduct that they banned any future film productions from shooting in the location. Caroline Munro, who was filming the Randall/Minasian production Slaughter High at the same time, was brought in for an extended cameo appearance to pad the runtime. Her scene was shot in a single day.

Purdom would eventually return to the production to finish directing and reprising his role as Inspector Harris. This resulted in the production using the original ending as written before Purdom's departure. Principal photography finally concluded in early 1984. Alan Lake, who portrays Giles Harrison, committed suicide two months before the film was released in the wake of the death of his wife Diana Dors earlier in 1984. This would be his final film role, as it would be for Gerry Sundquist, who also committed suicide in 1993.

The troubled production of the film was documented in the behind-the-scenes documentary The Making of a Horror Film. The experience turned Purdom off from further directing, and he returned to Rome to resume his acting career. Also displeased with the results, Alan Birkinshaw was credited under the pseudonym 'Al McGoohan'.

== Release ==
Don't Open till Christmas was distributed theatrically in the United States by 21st Century Film Corporation, opening in New York City on 7 December 1984.

=== Home media ===
It was first released on VHS in the United States and United Kingdom by Vestron Video. Since then the film is believed to be in the public domain as numerous entertainment companies have released it on DVD.

Vinegar Syndrome released the film on Blu-ray on 25 October 2022.

== Reception ==
Variety deemed the film "a poorly made horror picture." DVD Verdict called the film "barely watchable", concluding "there's very little redeemable about Don't Open Till Christmas, but for exploitation die-hards, Dick Randall's productions are always worth watching for a lot of blood, sex, and a few laughs". The horror film review website Hysteria Lives! gave the film 1.5 out of 5 stars, writing: "Words can hardly begin to say how truly bad this movie is! It is a Christmas turkey (with side trimming of cheese, natch) par excellence!"

In a retrospective for Fangoria, Samantha McLaren writes: "It might be a bit of a mess narratively, but Don't Open Till Christmas still offers some violent festive kills against the seedy backdrop of 1980s London. Plus, you get to have a good nosey around gruesome tourist attraction, The London Dungeon, without paying the exorbitant admission fee." In a list of 82 Christmas-themed horror films ranked for /Film, Matt Donato placed the film at number 46, writing: "Listen, I'm suspect numero uno when it comes to loving cheesy '80s slashers. So why didn't Don't Open Till Christmas shine bright like a diamond in my eyes? Overreacting to the max, awkward cutaways, a Santa slaying fetish – all the makings of a great Xmas Horror entry, but execution is more off-putting than potent."

== Sources ==
- DuPée, Matthew C. (2022). A Scary Little Christmas: A History of Yuletide Horror Films, 1972-2020. Jefferson, North Carolina: McFarland & Company. ISBN 978-1-476-64540-7.
- Normanton, Peter (2012). The Mammoth Book of Slasher Movies. London, England: Robinson. ISBN 978-0-762-44596-7.
