= Four Dimensions of Greta =

1972 British film by Pete Walker

- UK theatrical release poster
- Directed by: Pete Walker
- Written by: Murray Smith
- Produced by: Pete Walker; Ray Selfe
- Starring: Leena Skoog; Tristan Rogers; Karen Boyes; Robin Askwith
- Cinematography: Peter Jessop
- Edited by: Matt McCarthy
- Music by: Harry South
- Production company: Peter Walker (Heritage)
- Distributed by: Hemdale (UK)
- Release date: 23 May 1972 (UK)
- Running time: 85 minutes
- Country: United Kingdom
- Language: English

Four Dimensions of Greta (also known as The Three Dimensions of Greta) is a 1972 British sex comedy film directed and produced by Pete Walker and starring Leena Skoog and Tristan Rogers. It was written by Murray Smith.

It features four 3-D film sequences. The tagline on the poster read, "A girl in your lap".

== Plot ==
Hans, a young German journalist arrives in London to write an article about au pair girls but is requested by friends to investigate the whereabouts of their teenage daughter Greta. He interviews four individuals who all paint distinctly different pictures of the missing girl – each revealing a different aspect. These reminiscences constitute the film's 3-D sequences. Hans finally tracks down Greta and discovers she has been kidnapped by an East End gangster.

== Cast ==
- Tristan Rogers as Hans Weimar
- Karen Boyes as Sue
- Alan Curtis as Carl Roberts
- Leena Skoog as Greta Gruber
- Robin Askwith as Roger Maidment
- Bill Maynard as Big Danny
- Kenneth Hendel as Percy
- Martin Wyldeck as Schikler
- Ivor Salter as hotel porter
- Pearl Hackney as Frau Gruber
- John Clive as Phil the Greek
- Nik Zaran as Johnny Maltese
- Carole Allen as Mrs Marks
- Ralph Ball as Fred Sharprock
- Derek Keller as footballer
- Elizabeth Bradley as Frau Schikler
- Marion Grimaldi as American woman
- Godfrey Kenton as Gruber
- Tom Mennard as Manchester businessman
- Erika Raffael as Karen Gruber
- Max Mason as policeman
- Felicity Devonshire as Serena
- Steve Emerson as villain
- Jane Cardew as Kirsten
- Minah Bird as Cyn
- Mike Stevens as policeman
- Richard O'Brien as degenerate
- Les Clark as Police Sergeant
- Steve Patterson as hippie
- Mike Brittain as hippie
- Pete Walker as waiter

== Production ==
The film was shot on location in London, England and Berlin, Germany.

== Critical reception ==
Monthly Film Bulletin said "Tepid and tedious sexploitation picture unredeemed either by its intermittently tongue-in-cheek approach or by its much-publicised use of three-dimensional effects. The latter are in fact confined to four black-and-white flashback sequences featuring some innocuous nudity, much pointless and exaggerated in-depth staging, and an incessant trick of getting characters to hold objects at arm's length in front of the camera lens."

The Spinning Image wrote, "thrusting a banana at the camera is evidently not as erotic as director Pete Walker might have hoped."

The Digital Fix noted an "amusingly daft sex film"

DVD Drive-in said, "although the title boasts '3-dimensional,' the characters are almost all 1-dimensional as only Robin Askwith (star of Horror Hospital and numerous Confessions and Carry On flicks) turns in a memorable performance as a shabby footballer romantically tied to Greta."
