= Melanie Shatner =

Canadian–American actress (born 1964)

- Born: Melanie Shatner; August 1, 1964 (age 62); Los Angeles, California, U.S.
- Occupation: Actress
- Years active: 1985–1998
- Spouse: Joel Gretsch (m. 1999)
- Children: 2
- Father: William Shatner

Melanie Shatner Gretsch (née Shatner; born August 1, 1964) is a Canadian–American actress.

== Biography ==
Shatner was born on August 1, 1964, in Los Angeles, California. She is the youngest daughter of actors Gloria Rand and William Shatner.

Shatner had a major role in the Subspecies film series as Becky Morgan, sister of the protagonist, Michelle Morgan.

She has been married to actor Joel Gretsch since September 5, 1999. They have two daughters born in 2002 and July 29, 2005.

In 2022, Shatner was diagnosed with stage IV breast cancer. A year later, her father received a diagnosis of stage IV melanoma with metastasization in his brain and lungs. Both received immunotherapy for two years and both became cancer-free in 2024.

== Filmography ==
=== Film ===
Year	Title	Role	Notes
1986	Star Trek IV: The Voyage Home	Jogger	(uncredited)
1989	Star Trek V: The Final Frontier	Yeoman	
1990	The First Power	Shopgirl	
1990	Syngenor	Bonnie Brown	
1991	Cthulhu Mansion	Eva	released in Spain as La Manson de los Cthulhu
1993	Bloodstone: Subspecies II	Rebecca Morgan	direct-to-video
1994	Bloodlust: Subspecies III	Rebecca	direct-to-video
1998	Surface to Air	Lt. Lori "Dakota" Forrester	released in U.S. in 1999

=== TV / web ===
Year	Title	Role	Notes
1989	This Is Your Life – William Shatner	Herself	TV series documentary
1989	Knots Landing	Marsha	episode: "Birds Do It, Bees Do It"
1990	Camp Cucamonga	Wendy	made-for-television movie
1995	The Alien Within	Catherine Harding	made-for-television movie
1995	Kung Fu: The Legend Continues	Amy Caufield	episode: "Cruise Missiles"
1995	Sisters	Kelly	episode: "The Passion of Our Youth"
1996	TekWar	Dr. Janet Blake	episode: "Betrayal"
1996	Madison	Leslie	2 episodes
1997	Perversions of Science	Dulcine	episode: "Boxed In"
1997	Their Second Chance	Dawn	made-for-television movie
1998	His Bodyguard	Claudia	made-for-television movie
2006	William Shatner in Concert	Herself	TV Land special
