= Ray Selfe =

British screenwriter (1932–2001)

- Born: 13 May 1932; Croydon, Surrey, England, United Kingdom
- Died: 3 September 2001 (aged 69); United Kingdom
- Occupations: Film director, film producer, screenwriter, actor, film editor

Ray Selfe was an English film director, producer, screenwriter, editor, actor and movie theatre owner.

Selfe was born into a working-class family in Croydon, Surrey and at the age of ten found a passion for film. Selfe was later expelled from Pitman's College at the age of fourteen and became a projectionist at a local movie theatre and ran a mobile cinema, taking film shows to youth clubs. In 1950, he had a brief national service in the RAF and was later discharged on medical grounds.

As a filmmaker, Selfe later went on to work on such films as Four Dimensions of Greta (1972), White Cargo (1973), Emmanuelle in Soho (1981) and Don't Open till Christmas (1984).

During Selfe's later years, he gained respect within the industry as a private film archive curator.

Selfe died of a heart attack at age 69.
