= Frank Braña =

Spanish actor (1934–2012)

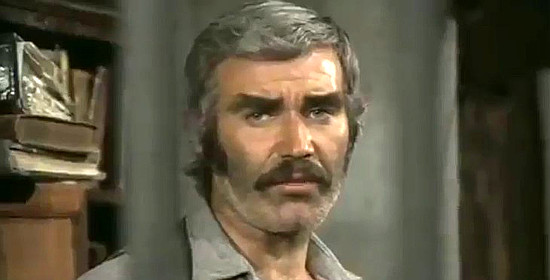
- Frank Brana as Sheriff Lewis Burton in Hai sbagliato... dovevi uccidermi subito! (1972)
- Born: Francisco Braña Pérez; 24 February 1934; Pola de Allande, Asturias, Spain
- Died: 13 February 2012 (aged 77); Madrid, Spain
- Other name: Paco
- Occupation: Actor

Frank Braña (born Francisco Braña Pérez; 24 February 1934 – 13 February 2012) was a Spanish character actor.

== Biography ==
He was born Francisco Braña Pérez in Pola de Allande, Asturias, Spain on 24 February 1934. Also credited as Frank Blank, Francisco Brana, Frank Brana, Frank Branya, Francisco Braña and Paco Braña, his career has been mostly based in Spanish and Italian movies of the spaghetti Western, horror and sword-and-sandal genres, having worked in more than 200 productions from the early 1960s, not always as a supporting actor.

He appeared in the Dollars Trilogy by Sergio Leone: Per un pugno di dollari (1964), he played Blackie in Per qualche dollaro in più (1965), and Il buono, il brutto, il cattivo (1966). He appeared in Sunscorched (1965) along Vivien Dodds, Óscar Pellicer and Luis Induni.

He appeared in And the Crows Will Dig Your Grave (1971) and Dallas (1972), by John Wood, Django Does Not Forgive (1967), by Julio Buchs, Django Kill... If You Live, Shoot! (1967), by Giulio Questi, If You Shoot... You Live!, by Javier Elorrieta, and Three Supermen of the West (1974), by Italo Martinenghi. He played Dan Robinson in Kilma, Queen of the Amazons (1976). He played Prince in Perseus Against the Monsters (1963) in a supporting role along Antonio Molino Rojo and Lorenzo Robledo, in Once Upon a Time in the West (1968) along Benito Stefanelli, Antonio Molino Rojo, Fabio Testi and Spartaco Conversi, federal agent Sam Puttnam in Light the Fuse... Sartana Is Coming (1970) along Massimo Serato, Nieves Navarro and José Jaspe, and Battle of the Amazons (1973) along Alberto Dell'Acqua, Benito Stefanelli and his son Marco.

One of his last film was Tiovivo c. 1950 (2004), by José Luis Garci, which received a nomination for Academy Award for Best International Feature Film. He continued working in spite of suffering from silicosis. In September 2007 he published the autobiography Morir con dignidad en el cine. In September 2011 he was awarded at I Festival Internacional de Cine Western alongside Craig Hill and Teresa Gimpera, Eugenio Martin, Rafael Romero Marchent, Cándida López (widow of Aldo Sanbrell), Antonio Pica, Dan van Husen, Nicoletta Machiavelli, Saturno Cerra, Fabio Testi and Al Matthews.

On 13 February 2012, 3:15 pm, Brana died from respiratory failure at a hospital in Madrid, Spain, he was 11 days away of his 78th birthday.

== Selected filmography ==
- Chinitas's Cafe (1960) – Tipo en palco (uncredited)
- Il conquistatore di Maracaibo (1961) – Pirate
- King of Kings (1961) – Roman Soldier (uncredited)
- Horizontes de luz (1962)
- Accidente 703 (1962) – Amigo de Perico (uncredited)
- Perseo l'invincibile (1963) – Prince (uncredited)
- Han robado una estrella (1963) – Camionero
- Los conquistadores del Pacífico (1963)
- Rififí en la ciudad (1963) – Mario Alonso (uncredited)
- Juego de hombres (1963)
- Gibraltar (1964) – Thug
- Apache Fury (1964) – Secuaz de Burt
- A Fistful of Dollars (1964) – Baxter Gang Member (uncredited)
- Brandy (1964) – Driver
- I due violenti (1964) – Perkins
- La tumba del pistolero (1964) – Jinete negro
- Doomed Fort (1964) – John
- Los siete bravísimos (1964)
- El señor de La Salle (1964) – (uncredited)
- El proscrito del río Colorado (1965) – Bandido
- Murieta (1965) – Pistolero 1
- Jandro (1965) – Roque
- The Last Tomahawk (1965) – Corporal (uncredited)
- La frontera de Dios (1965)
- Sunscorched (1965)
- For a Few Dollars More (1965) – Blackie (Indio's Gang) (uncredited)
- Adiós gringo (1965) – Ranchester's henchman with red shirt
- A Coffin for the Sheriff (1965) – Lupe's Henchman
- Due mafiosi contro Al Capone (1966) – Bud Messina
- Gunman Called Nebraska (1966) – Dickson
- High Season for Spies (1966)
- Per il gusto di uccidere (1966) – (uncredited)
- Sugar Colt (1966) – Bandit
- The Ugly Ones (1966)
- The Texican (1966) – U.S. Marshal Vic
- The Big Gundown (1966) – Widow's ranchero (uncredited)
- The Good, the Bad and the Ugly (1966) – Bounty Hunter #2 (uncredited)
- Jugando a morir (1966)
- Django Does Not Forgive (1966)
- El hombre que mató a Billy el Niño (1967) – Murphy's Henchman (uncredited)
- A Witch Without a Broom (1967) – Captain of the Guard
- Django Kill... If You Live, Shoot! (1967) – Templer Henchman (uncredited)
- Un hombre vino a matar (1967) – Tom
- El halcón de Castilla (1967) – Alejandro
- God Forgives... I Don't! (1967) – Smoking poker player with moustache
- Face to Face (1967) – Jason
- 15 Scaffolds for a Murderer (1967) – Adam, Sandy's Henchman
- Dos hombres van a morir (1968) – Juez
- Tutto per tutto (1968) – Posse Sheriff
- Lo voglio morto (1968)
- Persecución hasta Valencia (1968)
- Pistol for a Hundred Coffins (1968) – Joe, Stagecoach Driver
- Suicide Commandos (1968) – (uncredited)
- El secreto del capitán O'Hara (1968) – Henry
- Ace High (1968) – Joe (uncredited)
- Once Upon a Time in the West (1968) – Member of Frank's Gang Smoking Pipe at Auction (uncredited)
- La muchacha del Nilo (1969) – Terry
- La morte sull'alta collina (1969) – Captain Young
- Garringo (1969) – Bill
- I vigliacchi non pregano (1969) – Rod, Blake Henchman (uncredited)
- Johnny Ratón (1969) – Bill
- The Price of Power (1969) – Mortimer (uncredited)
- I diavoli della guerra (1969) – Peter Kolowsky
- Santo frente a la muerte (1969) – Mario
- The Avenger, Zorro (1969) – Dominguez (uncredited)
- The House That Screamed (1970)
- Golpe de mano (Explosión) (1970) – El Fulminante
- Che fanno i nostri supermen tra le vergini della jungla? (1970) – Zumakov
- Santo contra los asesinos de la mafia (1970)
- Manos torpes (1970)
- Churchill's Leopards (1970) – François Leduc
- Un par de asesinos (1970) – Brian Lester
- Il magnifico Robin Hood (1970) – Prince John
- El bosque del lobo (1970) – (uncredited)
- Cloud of Dust... Cry of Death... Sartana Is Coming (1970) – Deputy Sheriff with Eye Patch
- Una chica casi decente (1971) – Luc
- And the Crows Will Dig Your Grave (1971) – Glenn Kovac
- In nome del padre, del figlio e della Colt (1971) – Judge Finlay
- Let's Go and Kill Sartana (1971)
- They Call Him Cemetery (1971) – Saloon Patron
- The Butcher of Binbrook (1971) – Dr. Lexter
- Nicholas and Alexandra (1971) – Gate Guard at Palace (uncredited)
- Delusions of Grandeur (1971) – (uncredited)
- The Boldest Job in the West (1972) – Jess
- Hai sbagliato... dovevi uccidermi subito! (1972) – Sheriff Lewis Burton
- Un dólar de recompensa (1972) – Judge
- Timanfaya (Amor prohibido) (1972)
- Arizona Kid (1972) – Austin Styles
- Crimen de amor (1972) – The detective
- Campeones del ring (1972)
- Una bala marcada (1972)
- La guerrilla (1973)
- La redada (1973)
- Hannah, Queen of the Vampires (1973) – Abdul Hamid – The Blind Sailor
- El secreto de la momia egipcia (1973) – James Barton
- Le Amazzoni – Donne d'amore e di guerra (1973)
- Oi teleftaioi tou Rupel (1973)
- ...e così divennero i 3 supermen del West (1973) – Brad
- Verflucht dies Amerika (1973) – Guardia mudo
- Return of the Blind Dead (1973) – Howard
- Fasthand (1973) – Quincy
- Santo contra el doctor Muerte (1973) – Henchman
- El último viaje (1974) – Sergio
- Il mio nome è Scopone e faccio sempre cappotto (1974)
- Los fríos senderos del crimen (1974) – Guy Malone
- Open Season (1974)
- Vacaciones sangrientas (1974)
- Las violentas (1974) – Peterson
- El último proceso en París (1974) – Taxista
- Metralleta 'Stein' (1975) – El Minero
- El clan de los inmorales (1975)
- Tarzán y el tesoro Kawana (1975) – Jack
- La última jugada (1975) – Ralph
- Los hijos de Scaramouche (1975) – Pierre
- Si quieres vivir... dispara (1975) – Marco
- Muerte de un quinqui (1975) – Martín
- El misterio de la perla negra (1976) – Julio
- Kilma, reina de las amazonas (1976) – Dan Robinson
- El alijo (1976) – Guardia civil
- El in... moral (1976)
- Las alimañas (1977) – Ralph
- Hitler's Last Train (1977) – Otto Kramer
- Where Time Began (1977) – Hans Belker
- Sweetly You'll Die Through Love (1977) – Toife (uncredited)
- Perros callejeros (1977) – El Esquinao
- Fantasma en el Oeste (1978)
- Missile X: The Neutron Bomb Incident (1978) – Rigo
- Supersonic Man (1979) – Peterson
- Savana violenza carnale (1979)
- The Cantabrians (1980)
- Revenge of the Black Wolf (1981) – Teodoro
- El lobo negro (1981)
- Mystery on Monster Island (1981) – Birling
- Buitres sobre la ciudad (1981) – Mike Haddon
- Las muñecas del King Kong (1981)
- Freddie of the Jungle (1981) – Jack
- Los diablos del mar (1982) – Van Hassel
- Pieces (1982) – Sgt. Holden
- Hundra (1983) – Chieftain
- The Pod People (1983) – Burt
- Goma-2 (1984) – Peio
- Yellow Hair and the Fortress of Gold (1984) – The Sergeant (uncredited)
- Story of O - Chapter 2 (1984)
- Guerra sucia (1984) – Bruno
- Tex and the Lord of the Deep (1985) – Mr. Bedford (uncredited)
- Yo, 'El Vaquilla' (1985) – Manuel
- Luna de lobos (1987) – Arriero
- Siesta (1987) – Park Policeman
- La herencia del mal (1987) – Hans
- Slugs (1988) – Frank Phillips
- Oro fino (1989)
- The Rift (1990) – Muller
- Don Juan, mi querido fantasma (1990) – Celador 5
- La mansión de los Cthulhu (1990) – Felix
- Superagentes en Mallorca (1990)
- Dyningar (1991) – Gen. Alonso
- Manoa, la ciudad de oro (1999) – Morgan
- El escarabajo de oro (1999) – Capitán Kidd
- El invierno de las anjanas (2000) – Colonel
- Maestros (2000)
- Tiovivo c. 1950 (2004) – Don Luis

== Bibliography ==
- Hughes, Howard (30 April 2011). Cinema Italiano: The Complete Guide from Classics to Cult. Bloomsbury Publishing. p. 328. ISBN 9780857719782.
- Neibaur, James L. (12 March 2015). The Clint Eastwood Westerns. Rowman & Littlefield. p. 196. ISBN 9781442245044.
