= Cthulhu Mansion =

1990 horror film by Juan Piquer Simón

- Film poster
- Directed by: Juan Piquer Simón
- Screenplay by: Juan Piquer Simón
- Produced by: Juan Piquer Simón; José Gutiérrez Maesso
- Starring: Frank Finlay; Brad Fisher; Melanie Shatner
- Cinematography: Julio Bragado
- Edited by: Paul Aviles
- Music by: Tim Souster
- Production company: Filmagic
- Release date: 1990
- Running time: 92 minutes
- Country: Spain
- Language: English

Cthulhu Mansion (also known as Black Magic Mansion and La Manson de los Cthulhu) is a 1990 Spanish horror film directed by Juan Piquer Simón.

== Plot ==
Hawk and the rest of his gang go on the run after murdering a drug dealer, at a carnival funhouse, to steal his cocaine. They kidnap a stage magician named Chandu and hide out in his mansion, using the time to tend to injuries and hide from the police and the drug dealer's partner. Hawk breaks into the magician's safe and is disappointed to find a book on Cthulhu instead of cash. Chandu calls upon the powers of the book and unleashes dark spirits upon everyone in the mansion.

== Cast ==
- Frank Finlay - Chandu
- Marcia Layton - Lisa / Lenore
- Luis Fernando Alvés - Chris
- Brad Fisher - Hawk
- Melanie Shatner - Eva
- Kaethe Cherney - Candy
- Paul Birchard - Billy
- Frank Braña - Felix

== Reception ==
The film received negative reviews for its poor writing, acting and special effects. The acting was described as "dreary readings that are painful to watch".

== Releases ==
Available on DVD, Cthulhu Mansion was also released as a blu-ray with a reversible sleeve and documentary on Simón by Vinegar Syndrome in 2021.
