= The Rift (1990 film) =

1990 film directed by Juan Piquer Simón

- Domestic poster
- Spanish: La grieta
- Directed by: Juan Piquer Simón
- Written by: Juan Piquer Simón; Mark Klein; David Coleman
- Produced by: Francesca De Laurentiis; José Antonio Escrivá; Juan Piquer Simón
- Starring: Jack Scalia; R. Lee Ermey; Ray Wise; Deborah Adair; John Toles-Bey; Ely Pouget
- Cinematography: Juan Mariné
- Edited by: Isaac Sehayek; Christopher Holmes
- Music by: Joel Goldsmith
- Production company: Dister Group
- Distributed by: Dister Group (Spain); Live Entertainment (U.S.)
- Release date: 9 March 1990 (Spain)
- Running time: 79 minutes
- Country: Spain
- Language: English
- Budget: Pta 225 million

The Rift (Spanish: La grieta) is a 1990 Spanish science-fiction horror film directed by Juan Piquer Simón and starring Jack Scalia, R. Lee Ermey and Ray Wise. The story concerns Wick Hayes (Scalia), an engineer who is blamed for the disappearance of the submarine he designed, and leads an investigation team to the depths of the ocean, where he encounters an array of abnormal creatures. Part of a wave of underwater fantasy films released around 1989, it was retitled Endless Descent for the U.S. market.

== Plot ==
An experimental submarine, the Siren II, with an experienced NATO crew, is sent to find out what happened to the missing Siren I. Wick Hayes, the designer of the sub, blames the Contek corporation's modifications to his original design. The Siren II is captained by experienced officer Captain Randolph Phillips. The Siren II traces Siren I's black box to an underwater rift. They are surrounded by a toxic weed, although an on-board scientist says plant life at this depth is impossible. Siren II escapes the weed by reversing the polarity of the hull, although some of the weed gets into the sub. Later, they surface in a cave system where they discover that Contek has been engaged in illegal genetic engineering experiments that have produced a variety of mutant creatures.

== Cast ==
- Jack Scalia as Wick Hayes
- R. Lee Ermey as Capt. Randall Phillips
- Ray Wise as H. Robbins
- Deborah Adair as Lt. Nina Crowley
- John Toles Bey as Joe "Skeets" Kane
- Ely Pouget as Ana Rivera
- Emilio Linder as Philippe Huppert
- Tony Isbert as Roger Fleming
- Álvaro Labra as Dr. Carlo Camerini
- Luis Lorenzo as Francisco Grau
- Frank Braña as H. Mueller
- Pocholo Martínez-Bordiú as Sven Holst (as J. Martinez Bordiu)
- Edmund Purdom as CEO Steensland
- Garrick Hagon as Barton (as Garick Hagon)
- James Aubrey as Contek 1
- Derrick Vopelka as Contek 2

== Production ==
=== Development and writing ===
In a contemporary Fangoria article, producer José Antonio Escrivá said that he wrote the film's outline. The original version was set in space. According to Piquer Simón, he was the one who changed the setting to distinguish it from Alien. He chose an underwater environment after coming across a news item about a rash of invasive seaweed caused by toxic waste in Norway. The original draft was written by Mark Klein. Another was contributed by novelist Colin Wilson. As uncredited executive producer Dino De Laurentiis was still not satisfied with the screenplay and contemplating cancellation, David Coleman was brought in shortly before filming to do a full rewrite which, day by day, was translated into Spanish for Juan Piquer Simón (who did not speak English) and faxed to De Laurentiis' in Los Angeles for approval.

Piquer Simón and Escrivá claimed that they were unaware of other supernatural underwater films made around the same time, such as The Abyss, Leviathan, DeepStar Six, The Evil Below and Lords of the Deep, and denied that The Rift had been made to capitalize on them. However, this has been called into question, as Dino De Laurentiis had started development on Leviathan before DEG's mounting debts forced him to relinquish the project to his brother Luigi's Filmauro in mid-1987. He then made The Rift with his daughter Francesca, who was also Escrivá's wife. According to Coleman, the Italian mogul told him he had made both Leviathan and the lower budgeted The Rift to pull the rug from under the B-movie producers who had ripped off his past blockbusters.

=== Casting ===
Leading man Jack Scalia had just suffered a setback after the sudden shutdown of a film he was shooting in Hong Kong, but received the offer to star in The Rift two days after he got back to the U.S. He was cast after a single meeting with De Laurentiis in his office. With De Laurentiis attached, the actors had certain expectations of quality about the project, and Ray Wise felt that that they were not necessarily met. R. Lee Ermey was particularly negative. He named the film among those he most regretted doing, and indicated that he did not get along with Wise.

=== Production design and special effects ===
Escrivá and Simon originally wanted Sergio Stivaletti to work on the film, and he agreed to design at least one of the creatures, but a scheduling conflict with The Church arose and he had to pass. Fellow Italian Carlo de Marchis, who had worked on Leviathan, was brought on board. Artist Ron Cobb, an alumn of both Leviathan and The Abyss, also contributed to the creature design. The special effects department was headed by Colin Arthur, an Englishman who had recently settled in Spain but did not yet have his own effects shop. As a result, much of the preparations were done inside the home where he lived with his wife and assistant María Luisa Pino. His team consisted of ten to twelve people, among them uncredited American technician Steve Humphrey, who had worked on previous De Laurentiis films.

=== Filming ===
Principal photography started on October 3, 1988, and lasted eight weeks. An additional fourteen weeks were necessary to capture the effects sequences. This was the longest shoot of Piquer Simón's career. Filming took place in Madrid, but most of post-production took place in Los Angeles. During production, the film's budget was quoted as US$1.3 million. A retrospective interview with Piquer Simón pegged the final cost at Pta 225 million (around US$2 million), which was sizeable for a Spanish film at the time, but still too low for the director's aspirations. The Spanish helmer had a translator with him on set to relay his instructions to American cast members. He asked Scalia to smoke during takes, to which the latter reluctantly acquiesced as he had already quit. Because of this, the actor started smoking again in real life.

== Release ==
=== Pre-release ===
The Rift received an industry screening at Ciné Palafox in Madrid, Spain, on November 25, 1989. Domestic pre-release posters and the French press announced that the film would be shown at the Paris International Festival of Fantastic and Science-Fiction Film, held between September 29 and October 8, 1989, but there is no indication that this actually happened.

=== Theatrical ===
In Spain, the film was released to general audiences on March 9, 1990, although its opening in the capital city of Madrid came on April 15, 1990. It was distributed by Dister Group. and drew 157,158 admissions. It is claimed in some discussions that the film received a limited theatrical release in the U.S. via Vidmark Entertainment on October 5, 1990, but no formal source could be found for it at this time.

=== Home video ===
In the U.S., the film received a VHS from Live Entertainment on February 21, 1991, under the new title of Endless Descent. In most international territories, video rights were acquired by RCA/Columbia Pictures International Video. It was re-issued on DVD and Blu-ray by Kino Lorber on September 21, 2016, which was credited as its first appearance on either medium.

== Reception ==
=== Reviews ===
Mainstream reviews for The Rift have been largely negative, with constant criticism of its derivative nature but conflicting opinions about its special effects. William Green of Sight and Sound excoriated the film, calling it a "lamentable ocean-floor thriller" populated by "desperate actors". Nigel Floyd of Fear magazine dismissed it as "[a] by-the-numbers Spanish submarine adventure, whose belated entry into the [underwater horror cycle] only serves to emphasize its redundancy." He also noted that "the model work and creature effects plumb new depths of ineptitude." Leonard Maltin gave the film his lowest rating, stating that "[a]nybody who sticks around for the climax ought to be decorated for their trouble [...] As usual, R. Lee Ermey acts circles around most of his co-stars; but, ultimately, even he cannot sell this bill of goods." The BBC's Radio Times called it "unfathomable junk with soggy suspense and damp drama" helmed by a "hack director" that "doesn’t have the budget, special effects know-how or acting smarts" to emulate its contemporaries. In his Creature Features book, John Stanley found it to be "an ineffective Aliens knock-off."

James O'Neill, author of the book Sci-Fi on Tape, called it "well cast" but "sunk by flat direction and unimpressive FX". In The Encyclopedia of Science Fiction Movies, C.J. Henderson assessed that The Rift merely consisted of "monsters and page after page of bad dialogue", although it offered "a few good effects". In his Horror and Science Fiction Films compendium, Donald C. Willis was mixed, crediting "some okay makeup and scenic effects", but noting a "functional, cliched story". In trade publication Variety, a reviewer identified as Besa. wrote that "The Rift comes just a little too late, since comparisons with The Abyss will be inevitable" but "[t]he all-important effects are on the whole well handed." Mike Mayo of The Roanoke Times and VideoHound was perhaps most positive, writing that "it's actually not bad" as "[t]he pace is brisk and the critter is fun".

Since it resurfaced on modern media, the film has enjoyed a modest reevaluation by the enthusiast press. VideoScope wrote that, while it followed several underwater monster movies, Piquer Simón "succeeds in delivering what is probably the most enjoyable of the bunch", as he keeps the action "fast-moving" and "ladles on the gore" to get around his modest resources. Ain't It Cool News complimented the effects, considering them "at least as decent as Deep Star Six and Leviathan" and concluded that despite being "full of action movie clichés", it was "a fun little ride". Den of Geek found that "The Rift isn’t big, and it sure isn’t clever, but it’s jaw-droppingly entertaining." Bloody Disgusting assessed that "[c]lunkiness aside, The Rift manages to be thoroughly enjoyable" thanks to "entertaining characters" and "[t]he creatures looking pretty good, all things considered".

=== Accolades ===
Year	Award	Category	Recipient	Result
1990	Fantasporto	Grand Prize	Juan Piquer Simón	Nominated
1990	Goya Awards	Best Special Effects	Colin Arthur, Basilio Cortijo, Carlo De Marchis	Won

== See also ==
- List of underwater science fiction works
