= Dick Randall (producer) =

American film producer, screenwriter, actor, and assistant director

- Born: Irving Reuben; March 3, 1926; Catskill Mountains, New York, U.S.
- Died: May 14, 1996 (aged 70); London, England
- Other names: Claudio Rainis
- Occupations: Producer, writer, actor, assistant director
- Years active: 1959–1991
- Spouse: Corliss Randall

Dick Randall (born Irving Reuben; March 3, 1926 – May 14, 1996) was an American film producer, screenwriter, actor and assistant director. He was known for his involvement in the production of exploitation films in Italy, Hong Kong, Spain, the Philippines and the United Kingdom. Randall's career covered a wide array of genres, including mondo documentaries, erotica, giallo, martial arts and slasher films.

== Personal life ==
A rotund cigar-smoker, Randall was born on March 3, 1926, in the Catskill Mountains, New York.

He was married to New Orleans-born singer Corliss Theresa Randall (née Anselmo), who collaborated with him on several films.

== Career ==
Randall's entertainment career began in the 1950s with writing gags for Milton Berle, before producing his first film, a George Jessel-narrated documentary about the 1958 World's Fair titled Holiday in Brussels, in 1959. He became saddled with debt after producing two unsuccessful Broadway plays. He relocated to Italy, where he specialized in producing and distributing low-budget mondo, sexploitation and giallo films, such as Primitive Love (1964), The Wild, Wild World of Jayne Mansfield (1968), Four Times That Night (1971), The French Sex Murders (1972) and The Girl in Room 2A (1974). During his time in Europe, he often worked under the alias Claudio Rainis.

Having earned a reputation for being able to acquire highly-disparate sources of finance for his films, Randall spent the 1970s and early 1980s primarily between Rome, London and Hong Kong, producing a wide range of films, including hardcore pornography such as Black Deep Throat (1976, starring Ajita Wilson), blacksploitation films including Death Dimension (1978, starring Jim Kelly), women-in-prison films such as Escape from Women's Prison (1978), Bruceploitation films including The Clones of Bruce Lee (1980) and slasher films such as Pieces (1982). Many of his films during this period were also mockbusters of other, popular films of the time, such as Supersonic Man (1979), For Your Height Only (1981), Invaders of the Lost Gold (1982), and The Pod People (1983). In 1981, he permanently settled in London, where he continued to work, producing Don't Open Till Christmas (1984, directed by his frequent collaborator Edmund Purdom), the documentary Don't Scream: It's Only a Movie! (1985) and Slaughter High (1986).

== Death ==
Randall died of a stroke in London on May 14, 1996.
