= White Cargo (1973 film) =

1973 film by Ray Selfe

- DVD cover
- Directed by: Ray Selfe
- Written by: Ray Selfe; David McGillivray
- Produced by: Olive Negus-Fancey
- Starring: David Jason; Hugh Lloyd; Imogen Hassall; Tim Barrett; David Prowse
- Cinematography: John Barnard
- Edited by: Peter Austen-Hunt
- Music by: David Lindup
- Production company: Border Film Productions
- Release date: 1973
- Running time: 77 minutes
- Language: English

White Cargo (also known as Albert's Follies) is a 1973 British comedy film directed by Ray Selfe and starring David Jason and Imogen Hassall. It was written by Selfe and David McGillivray.

== Plot ==
Albert Toddey, who daydreams of being a James Bond-type secret agent, recalls in flashback how he came to be a "government employee with a position of responsibility":

Having been sent a ticket for a supposed high-end gentlemen's club, Albert attends but finds it is a low-end strip club. The club is under surveillance by two bowler-hatted bumbling Home Office investigators, Chumley and Fosdyke who use a variety of transparent disguises throughout the film. While Desirée, a stripper, performs. Albert notices an off-stage argument between the attractive Stella and bouncer Harry, and daydreams of overpowering Harry and rescuing her. Acting on this impulse, he is instead drenched in the water from a mop-bucket, and – along with Stella, who was caught going through the boss's desk – is thrown out into the street.

Stella takes pity on him and asks him back to her apartment to dry off but as he changes, Stella is kidnapped by Harry. She manages to indicate to Albert that he should find a book, handwritten in Arabic, that she stole from the desk. Chumley and Fosdyke enter the flat, posing as gas meter readers, and advise Albert to take the book to an Eastern trading company for translation, where they lie in wait for him. At the trading company, they translate an address of a house in the country before Albert takes back the book and escapes. At the country house, Albert finds the owner of the strip club, Fox, Harry and a number of hoods running a trade in white slavery. Harry offers up his girlfriend Desirée to complete an order, along with six women chained up in the cellar. Albert sneaks in through the open French windows, and finds one of the women in the cellar is Stella. He daydreams of taking a poker from the upstairs fireplace, freeing the women with it, tying up the hoods and knocking out Fox. Albert finds no poker, but finds a tyre iron in a van outside, and creates a diversion to re-enter the house by jamming on the van's horn. He fails either to free the women or tie up the hoods, and is chained up overnight with Stella. Meanwhile, Chumley and Fosdyke enter the house posing as census takers, but leave suspicious – for all the names they are given for the residents are of famous film actors.

In the morning, the captives, along with Desirée, are taken in the van to a dockyard warehouse. On the journey, Chumley and Fosdyke appear from hiding in the back of the van, and Stella reveals herself to be an undercover police officer investigating Fox. At the warehouse, while Stella is interrogated over the stolen book, Albert daydreams about overpowering their guard, knocking out the hoods with a hare-brained pulley system and locking Fox in a crate. His scheme fails; however, he manages to knock out the hoods one by one by dropping crates on their heads, while Desirée and the other women gleefully chain up their erstwhile captors. Albert knocks Fox into the dock while Stella phones the police.

As a reward, Albert gets his "position of responsibility" – as the doorman at New Scotland Yard.

== Cast ==
- David Jason as Albert Toddey
- Hugh Lloyd as Chumley
- Imogen Hassall as Stella
- Tim Barrett as Fosdyke
- David Prowse as Harry
- Raymond Cross as Dudley Fox
- Sue Bond as Desirée
- Nik Zaran as strip-club manager
- John Barber as special agent
- Stanley Stewart as Jim
- Geraldine Hart as housewife
- Roger Adamson as carpet salesman
- Paddy McQueen as old lady
- Peter Thompson as paraffin man
- Sonny Caldinez as bodyguard
- Frank Ray as thug
- Bozena as blonde captive girl in black
- Viviene Stokes as captive girl in pink
- Deirdre Lindsay as captive girl
- Kirstie Pooley as captive girl in blue
- Jacqueline Hurst as captive girl
- David McGillivray as customer

== Production ==
The film was made at Twickenham Film Studios.

== Reception ==
The Monthly Film Bulletin wrote: "A wretchedly unfunny attempt at a comedy in the old Norman Wisdom style, faithfully resurrecting every 'rude' gag from falling trousers to laboriously clambering (at great risk to manhood) over a gate that proves to be unlocked. Particularly embarrassing is an effort to beef up the sexploitation angle with what is probably the coyest sex scene ever shot; mercifully, there is every sign that the film has been heavily cut."
