= Edmund Purdom =

English actor (1926–2009)

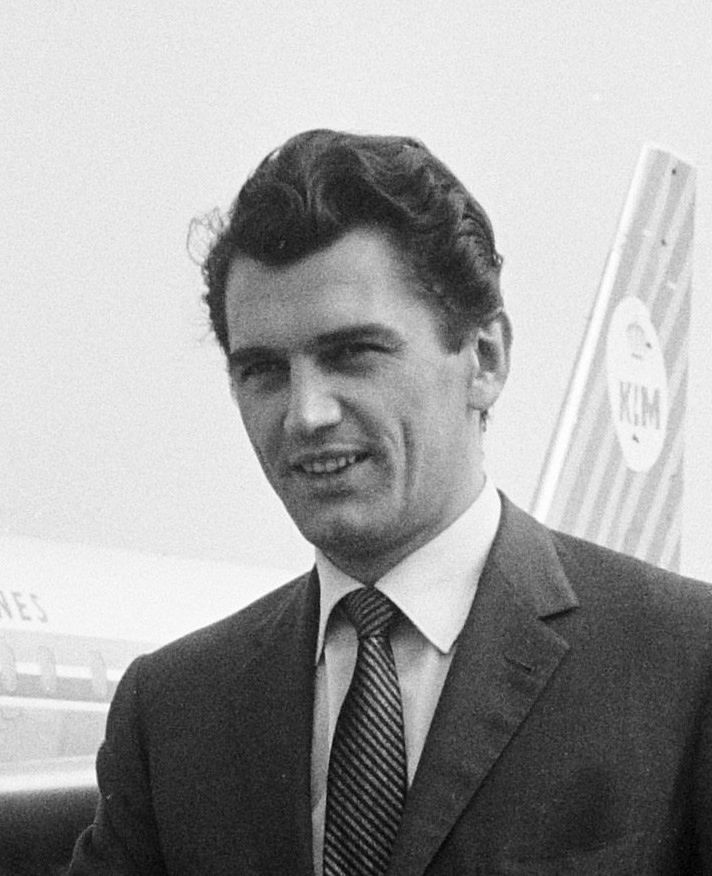
- Edmund Purdom in 1962
- Born: Edmund Anthony Cutlar Purdom; 19 December 1926; Welwyn Garden City, Hertfordshire, England
- Died: 1 January 2009 (aged 82); Rome, Italy
- Occupations: Actor, voice actor
- Years active: 1950–2001
- Spouses: Anita Phillips (m. 1951; div. 1956) Alicia Darr (m. 1957; div. 1958) Linda Christian (m. 1962; div. 1963) Vivienne Purdom (m. 2000)
- Children: 2

Edmund Anthony Cutlar Purdom (19 December 1926 – 1 January 2009) was an English actor, voice artist, and director. He worked first on stage in Britain, performing various works by Shakespeare, then in the United States on Broadway and in Hollywood, and eventually in Italy. He is perhaps best known for his starring role in the 1954 films The Egyptian and The Student Prince.

By taking over important roles exited by Mario Lanza and Marlon Brando, Purdom was known by the mid-1950s as "The Replacement Star". After the failure of his Hollywood career, Purdom returned briefly to the United Kingdom and then settled in Italy, where he spent the remainder of his life appearing in local films. Between the 1970s and 1990s, he was a regular in European genre cinema, working with directors like Juan Piquer Simón, Joe D'Amato, Sergio Martino and Ruggero Deodato.

== Early life ==
Edmund Cutlar Purdom was born in Welwyn Garden City, Hertfordshire on 19 December 1926, the youngest of four children of Charles Purdom, a London drama critic, and his wife, Lillian Antonia (née Cutlar). Raised Catholic, Purdom was educated by Jesuits at St Ignatius College, Stamford Hill, and, later, by Benedictines at Downside School.

== Career ==
He began his acting career in 1946, aged 19, by joining the Northampton Repertory Company, appearing in productions that included Romeo and Juliet and Molière's The Imaginary Invalid. After two years of military service where he joined the Army's Central Pool of Artists, he joined the Royal Shakespeare Theatre at Stratford-upon-Avon for two seasons. Laurence Olivier saw Purdom and offered him a chance to tour in the U.S.

=== United States ===
In 1951–1952, Purdom appeared in small roles with the Laurence Olivier/Vivien Leigh company on Broadway in Shakespeare's Antony and Cleopatra and Shaw's Caesar and Cleopatra. His good looks brought him to the attention of Hollywood. Universal tested him for the part of the leading girl's brother in The Mississippi Gambler but decided he was too British. 20th Century Fox tested him for a role in My Cousin Rachel. MGM offered him a small role in Rhapsody, which he turned down.

He made a screen test at Warner Brothers, directed by Michael Curtiz, from a scene from Force of Arms but Warners were not interested. As Purdom had left his play, he did not have the fare to return to Britain, so he decided to stay in Hollywood.

"I was so broke", Purdom recalled, "that I couldn't afford to pay the doctor's bill when my daughter was born. I had no money for bus fare. I had to walk from studio to studio looking for a job. Once we were evicted for not paying the rent."

=== MGM ===
He managed to get a small part in Julius Caesar at MGM, playing the role of the character Strato. George Cukor recommended him to Charles Brackett for the small role of Charles Lightoller in Titanic (1953). This brought Purdom to the attention of executives at MGM who signed him to a long-term contract.

=== The Student Prince ===
Mario Lanza was fired from the lead role in a new version of The Student Prince (1954). Purdom was suggested for the part and he did a successful test, directed by George Sidney. He was cast opposite Ann Blyth. The film was directed by Richard Thorpe. Purdom lip-synched to Lanza's singing voice.

=== The Egyptian ===
Advance word on The Student Prince was promising, and when 20th Century Fox needed an actor at the last minute to replace Marlon Brando as the title character in The Egyptian, its most lavish production of 1954, Purdom was cast over John Derek, John Cassavetes and Cameron Mitchell.

MGM's head of production Dore Schary announced the studio would build up Purdom as a star. He was cast in three films: another MGM musical, Athena; the title role in the biblical epic The Prodigal, MGM's most lavish production of 1955, opposite Lana Turner; and the swashbuckler The King's Thief (1955), in a role originally meant for Stewart Granger. There was some talk he would appear in the remake of Ben Hur.

The Student Prince was released and became a hit. Purdom was called "the most promising new star in Hollywood". Hedda Hopper called Purdom "the most surprising and notable figure this year in Hollywood...a fine actor in the great romantic tradition."

=== Leaving MGM ===
Schary later wrote in his memoirs that "Lanza's recordings were the prime ingredient for the picture's success, and that success went to Purdom's head. He believed he was responsible for the happy result. He asked for a new contract. We denied it. He asked for a release. We granted it." Another contributing factor may have been that while The Student Prince had been a hit, The Egyptian was a box-office disappointment. Athena, The Prodigal and The King's Thief were all flops.

There was more bad publicity when he had an affair with Linda Christian (when she was married to Tyrone Power) leading to him divorcing his first wife. The split was bitter and public, and his wife later sued him for child support. Purdom argued for a reduction in child support because he no longer had his MGM contract worth $40,000 per year. He told the court he had renegotiated it in order to seek more money by freelancing and that he was in debt for $11,500. He said MGM had an option on his services for three films over three years. "It is my greatest desire to get back in front of the camera at the present time," he said.

He was announced for Loser Takes All (1956) but did not appear in the final film.

For Allied Artists, Purdom made Strange Intruder (1956) with Ida Lupino. In 1957, he married Alicia Darr, who later got in a brawl with Christian. He continued to be sued for debts by his ex-wife and his lawyers.

Purdom returned to Broadway, appearing in Child of Fortune, an adaptation of Henry James's The Wings of the Dove, for Jed Harris. Brooks Atkinson of The New York Times stated Purdom "plays the part of the faithless suitor like a cultivated gentleman but his style is heavy." The play closed after 23 performances.

=== Europe ===
In 1958, Purdom went back to the UK, where he played the lead role in Sword of Freedom (also known as Marco the Magnificent), a swashbuckler television series made for ITC Entertainment. He then went to Italy, where the film industry was booming and there was a demand for English-speaking actors in order to ensure international distribution for the films. Purdom eventually settled permanently in Italy. His films included Herod the Great (1959), The Cossacks (1960), The Loves of Salammbo (1960), Suleiman the Conqueror (1961) and Nefertiti, Queen of the Nile (1961). He also occasionally worked in England on films such as Malaga (1960) and The Comedy Man (1964).

In 1962, he said "I couldn't stand Hollywood. The people, their status, symbols and public image were too much. I walked out. Perhaps I should have been more patient." Hedda Hopper wrote in response to this: "the truth is he did his best to become a star here, but he didn't make the grade – even with Mario Lanza's voice; but he did walk out on his wife and family and start gallivanting around with Linda Christian. I'll bet he'll come hopping back if anyone crooked a finger." He married Christian in 1962, but they divorced the following year.

He continued to work extensively in Italian B-films, on television and as a voice dubbing actor for many years (recording dialogue translated from Italian into English for sales of Italian films in English-speaking countries).

He had roles in TV movies and miniseries, such as Sophia Loren: Her Own Story (as Vittorio De Sica) and The Winds of War. In 1984, he came back to his native country to direct the horror film Don't Open till Christmas. He narrated a popular short documentary on the life of Padre Pio. He also narrated the 1997 documentary, 7 Signs of Christ's Return. His last role was in The Knights of the Quest (2001).

== Personal life ==
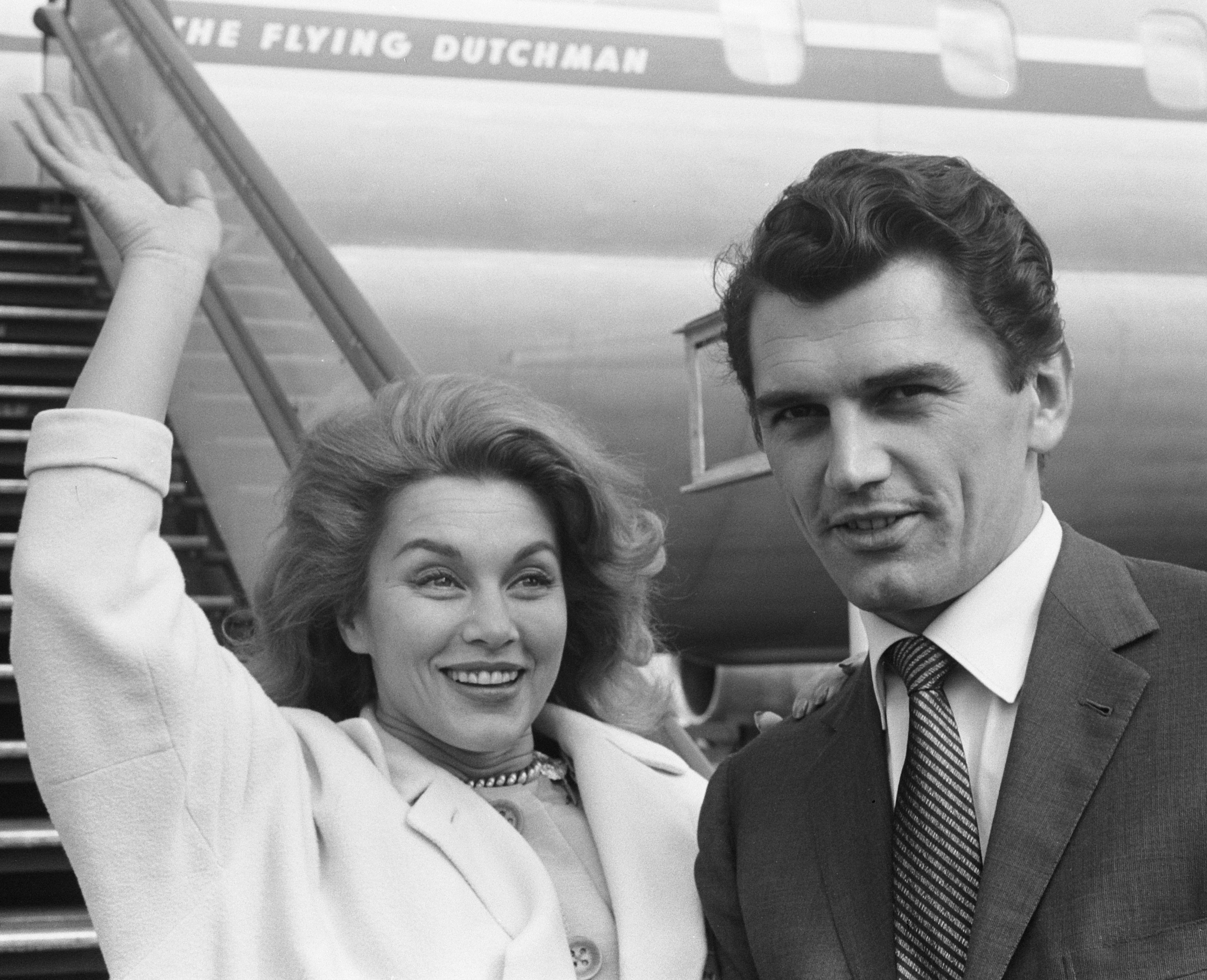
Purdom with Linda Christian in 1962

Purdom was married four times and divorced three times.

- Anita "Tita" Phillips, the mother of his daughters, Lilan (born 11 October 1952) and Marina Ann (born 8 July 1954); they married in a Catholic wedding at the Brompton Oratory in London on 5 January 1951 and divorced on 5 March 1956
- Alicia Darr (née Barbara Kopczyńska; married/divorced 1957)
- Linda Christian (married in 1962; divorced in 1963)
- Vivienne Purdom, photographer (married from 2000 until his death in 2009)

His elder daughter, Lilan Purdom, became a journalist with the French television channel TF1. She is the author of the book Hollywood Garage, about her father's career.

=== Death ===
Purdom died from heart failure on 1 January 2009 in Rome at age 82. He was survived by his fourth wife, Vivienne, a photographer, and his two daughters by his first wife.

== Partial stage credits ==
Year	Title	Role	Venue	Notes
1945	Acacia Avenue	Peter Robinson	Royal & Derngate, Northhampton	
1946	Romeo and Juliet		Royal & Derngate, Northhampton	
1946	The Imaginary Invalid		Royal & Derngate, Northhampton	
1948	King John	Ensemble member	Royal Shakespeare Theatre, Stratford-Upon-Avon	
1948	The Merchant of Venice	Ensemble member	Royal Shakespeare Theatre, Stratford-Upon-Avon	
1948	Hamlet	Ensemble member	Royal Shakespeare Theatre, Stratford-Upon-Avon	
1948	The Taming of the Shrew	Ensemble member	Royal Shakespeare Theatre, Stratford-Upon-Avon	
1948	The Winter's Tale	Dancer	Royal Shakespeare Theatre, Stratford-Upon-Avon	
1948	Troilus and Cressida	Patroclus	Royal Shakespeare Theatre, Stratford-Upon-Avon	
1948	Othello		Royal Shakespeare Theatre, Stratford-Upon-Avon	
1949	Macbeth	Messenger	Royal Shakespeare Theatre, Stratford-Upon-Avon	
1949	Cymbeline	Roman Captain	Royal Shakespeare Theatre, Stratford-Upon-Avon	
1949	Othello		Royal Shakespeare Theatre, Stratford-Upon-Avon	
1949	Henry VIII	George Nevill, 5th Baron Bergavenny	Royal Shakespeare Theatre, Stratford-Upon-Avon	
1949-50	Much Ado About Nothing		Royal Shakespeare Theatre, Stratford-Upon-Avon	
1949-50	Cymbeline		Royal Shakespeare Theatre, Stratford-Upon-Avon	
1950	Golden City	Piet van Niekerk	Adelphi Theatre, London	West End debut
1951	Caesar and Cleopatra	Persian	St James's Theatre, London	
1951	Caesar and Cleopatra	Persian	Manchester Opera House, Manchester	
1951	Antony and Cleopatra	Thydias	St James's Theatre, London	
1951	Antony and Cleopatra	Thydias	Manchester Opera House, Manchester	
1951-52	Caesar and Cleopatra	Persian	Ziegfeld Theatre, New York	Broadway debut
1951-52	Antony and Cleopatra	Thydias	Ziegfeld Theatre, New York	
1956	Child of Fortune	Richard Denning	Royale Theatre, New York	

== Selected filmography ==
- Goodyear Playhouse (1952, TV series) – episode "The Medea Cup"
- Titanic (1953) – Second Officer Lightoller (uncredited)
- Julius Caesar (1953) – Strato
- The Student Prince (1954) – Prince Karl
- The Egyptian (1954) – Sinuhe
- Athena (1954) – Adam Calhorn Shaw
- The Prodigal (1955) – Micah
- The King's Thief (1955) – Michael Dermott
- Strange Intruder (1956) – Paul Quentin
- Trapped in Tangier (1957) – John Milwood
- Sword of Freedom (1957–1958, TV series) – Marco del Monte
- Herod the Great (1959) – Erode / Herodes
- The Diary of Anne Frank (1959) – British Radio Announcer (voice, uncredited)
- Tales of the Vikings (1959–1960, TV series) – Egil / King Lawrence
- Moment of Danger (1960, aka Malaga) – Peter Carran
- The Cossacks (1960) – Shamil, the Sheik
- The Loves of Salammbo (1960) – Narr Havas
- The Night They Killed Rasputin (1960) – Rasputin
- Fury of the Pagans (1960) – Toryok
- Big Request Concert (1960) – Harry Mell
- The Last of the Vikings (1961) – King Sveno
- La Fayette (1961) – Silas Deane
- Queen of the Nile (1961) – Tumos
- White Slave Ship (1961) – Dr. Bradley
- The Last Ride to Santa Cruz (1964) – Rex Kelly
- The Beauty Jungle (1964) – Rex Carrick
- The Comedy Man (1964) – Julian Baxter
- The Yellow Rolls-Royce (1964) – John Fane
- Heroes of Fort Worth (1965) – Patterson
- The Man Who Laughs (1966) – Cesare
- Sweden: Heaven and Hell (1968) – Narrator (English version)
- Chrysanthemums for a Bunch of Swine (1968)
- Blackie the Pirate (1971) – Viceroy
- The Fifth Cord (1971) – Edouard Vermont
- Lucifera: Demon Lover (1972) – Gunther
- Il Boss (1973) – Avvocato Rizzo (English version, voice, uncredited)
- The Big Family (1973) – Giovanni Lutture
- High Crime (1973) – Franco (English version, voice, uncredited)
- Frankenstein's Castle of Freaks (1974) – Prefect
- The Perfume of the Lady in Black (1974) – Andy (English version, voice, uncredited)
- What Have They Done to Your Daughters? (1974) – Prof. Beltrame (English version, voice, uncredited)
- The Suspects (1974) – Le journaliste américain
- The Cursed Medallion (1975) – Doctor
- Povero Cristo (1975) – Man in tailcoat
- A Matter of Time (1976) – (uncredited)
- Mister Scarface (1976) – Luigi Cherico
- Big Pot (1976) – Professor Vanderberg
- The Concorde Affair (1979) – Danker
- Pensieri Morbosi (English title: Deep Thoughts) (1980) - The Pianist
- Absurd (1981) – Father
- Pieces (1982) – The Dean
- Ator, the Fighting Eagle (1982) – Griba
- Amok (1983) – Jaarsveld
- 2019, After the Fall of New York (1983) – President of the Pan American Confederacy
- Champagne in paradiso (1983) – Paola's Father
- Don't Open till Christmas (1984) – Inspector Ian Harris
- Killer vs. Killers (1985) - His Excellency
- The Assisi Underground (1985) – Cardinal Della Costa
- Fracchia contro Dracula (1985) – Count Dracula
- Don Bosco (1988) – Urbano Rattazzi
- The Rift (1990) – CEO Steensland
- Un orso chiamato Arturo (1992)
- A Ray of Sun (1997) – voice of Renzo Rossellini
- Titanic: The Legend Goes On (2001) – voice of Jeremy McFlannel
- The Knights of the Quest (2001) – Hugh of Clarendon
