= Pieces (film) =

1982 slasher film directed by Juan Piquer Simón

- Spanish film poster
- Spanish: Mil gritos tiene la noche
- Literally: The Night Has 1,000 Screams
- Directed by: Juan Piquer Simon
- Screenplay by: Dick Randall; Roberto Loyola
- Produced by: Dick Randall; Stephen Minasian
- Starring: Christopher George; Paul Smith; Edmund Purdom; Linda Day; Ian Sera; Jack Taylor
- Cinematography: Juan Mariné
- Edited by: Antonio Gimeno
- Music by: Librado Pastor (Spanish cut); CAM (Note: Stock music, credited as CAM (Creazioni Artistiche Musicali). Full list of composers is Stelvio Cipriani, Carlo Maria Cordio, Stephen Ham, Alain Leroux, Fabio Frizzi, Enrico Pieranunzi, and Silvano Chimenti) (international cut)
- Production company: Almena Film Production
- Distributed by: Internacional Films Distribución (Spain); Film Ventures International (U.S.)
- Release dates: August 23, 1982 (Spain); October 14, 1983 (U.S.)
- Running time: 89 minutes
- Country: Spain
- Languages: Spanish (Note: Pieces was shot using actors who spoke English and Spanish; thus, both Spanish and English-language dubs of the film exist.); English
- Budget: $300,000
- Box office: $2 million (U.S.)

Pieces (Spanish: Mil gritos tiene la noche, lit. 'The Night Has 1,000 Screams') is a 1982 Spanish slasher film directed by Juan Piquer Simón, written and produced by Dick Randall, and starring Christopher George, Paul Smith, Edmund Purdom, Linda Day George, Ian Sera and Jack Taylor. The plot follows an unknown assailant killing female students at a college campus in Boston.

Pieces was filmed largely in Spain. It was released in Spain in August 1982, and was distributed in the United States the following year by Film Ventures International.

Since its release, the film has attracted a cult following. While not prosecuted for obscenity, the film was seized and confiscated in the UK under Section 3 of the Obscene Publications Act 1959 during the video nasty controversy.

== Plot ==
Ten-year-old Timmy Reston is berated by his mother for playing with a jigsaw puzzle of a nude woman. After she orders him to dispose of the puzzle, he returns with an axe, murders her, then dismembers her body with a hacksaw. When the police arrive, Timmy hides in a closet and pretends to be a witness to the crime. The police believe Timmy's story and he is sent to live with his aunt. Forty years later, after witnessing a female skateboarder smash into a mirror, a black-clad figure opens a box containing a photograph of Timmy's mother and her bloodied dress. He takes out the bloodied jigsaw puzzle and starts to put it together.

A female student studying on the lawn of her Boston university is decapitated with a chainsaw by an unidentified killer who steals her head. Lt. Bracken and his partner, Sgt. Holden, investigate the murder. Arthur Brown, a reserved professor of anatomy who is teased by students for being homosexual, gives the detectives a tour of the school, where the groundskeeper, Willard, is trimming hedges with a chainsaw. A student, Kendall, receives a note from a female classmate to meet her at the pool for sex, but the killer sends Kendall a fake note to divert him and then murders the girl with a chainsaw. Willard arrives on the scene and is arrested as a suspect after the police find a chainsaw by the victim, missing her torso, at the pool. Professor Brown inspects the remains, and is briefly considered a suspect.

Dr. Jennings meets with Kendall at the station in hopes that he can help provide a profile of the murderer. Bracken brings in undercover officer and former tennis pro Mary Riggs to pose as a tennis instructor at the college, with Kendall's assistance. Reporter Sylvia Costa is stonewalled by Bracken. That evening, the killer stalks a student and saws her arms off inside an elevator just before Kendall and the police arrive, then stabs Sylvia to death on a waterbed.

One of Mary's tennis students, Suzie, is chased down in the locker room by the killer and sawed in half. While Mary and Kendall focus on turning off blasting music the killer turned on as a diversion, the killer escapes with Suzie's legs. Kendall theorizes that the killer is a faculty member, since he knows when and where to strike while avoiding police. They discover that the dean changed his name and that his mother was brutally murdered; the dean is Timmy.

Meanwhile, Mary is drugged with a paralytic substance by Timmy at his apartment. He attempts to saw off her feet, since the previous victim's feet did not fit in his mother's shoes. Bracken, Holden, and Kendall burst into Timmy's apartment. He is shot dead by Bracken while Kendall rescues Mary.

After finding the jigsaw puzzle in Timmy's apartment, Holden jokes to Kendall about joining the police and leans on a bookshelf, which spins around to reveal Timmy's human puzzle, a decomposing body made of pieces of his victims stitched together in his mother's dress, which falls out onto Kendall. The shaken Kendall turns to leave with Holden, but the jigsaw corpse inexplicably comes to life, grabbing and crushing Kendall's genitalia as he screams.

== Cast ==
- Christopher George as Lieutenant Bracken
- Frank Brana as Sergeant Holden
- Lynda Day as Mary Riggs
- Paul Smith as Willard
- Edmund Purdom as Dean Reston
  - Alejandro Hernandez as Child Timmy Reston
- Ian Serra as Kendall
- Jack Taylor as Professor Brown
- Isabelle Luque as Sylvia
- Gerard Tichy as Dr. Jennings
- May Heatherly as Mrs. Reston
- Hilda Fuchs as Grace
- Roxana Nieto as Virginia Palmer
- Cristina Cottrelli as Jenny
- Leticia Marfil as Suzie
- Silvia Gambino as Mary
- Carmen Aguado as Carla
- Paco Alvez as Alister Schwartz
- Bruce Le as Mr. Chao (uncredited)

== Analysis ==
Film scholar Ian Conrich notes in Horror Zone: The Cultural Experience of Contemporary Horror Cinema that Pieces has an "almost self-reflexive awareness of its status as an exploitation film". Conrich summarizes the film as a "hybrid amalgamation" of body horror films, "the pioneering splatter films of Herschell Gordon Lewis", and the Italian giallo. Additionally, Conrich criticizes the film for having a "transparently misogynistic narrative" as well as resembling the aesthetics of pornography, featuring scenarios similar to those found in contemporaneous adult films.

== Production ==
=== Development ===
The script for Pieces was written by American exploitation filmmaker Dick Randall and Italian producer Roberto Loyola, credited as "John W. Shadow". Contrary to popular belief, Joe D'Amato was not involved in this production. Director Juan Piquer Simón had previously been considered to direct a sequel to The Last House on the Left (1972), but he ultimately passed on the project.

The script treatment for Pieces, then titled Jigsaw, was given to Simon by Randall and Stephen Minasian, with whom he had worked on previous films. The initial treatment was originally intended to be made as a television film.

=== Casting ===
The film starred the husband and wife team Christopher George (of TV's The Rat Patrol) and Linda Day (of TV's Mission: Impossible). Other key roles were played by expatriate American actors Paul L. Smith (of Midnight Express and Popeye), Jack Taylor (known for his work with Jesús Franco), and May Heatherly (of TV's The Man from U.N.C.L.E.).

Kendall was played by Ian Sera, a Spanish-speaking British actor from Gibraltar, who had starred in Simón's previous film Mystery on Monster Island. The rest of the cast were local Spanish actors. Bruce Le, a star of Bruceploitation martial arts films from Hong Kong, made an uncredited cameo in the film, as he was shooting a different film for Dick Randall at the same time.

=== Filming ===
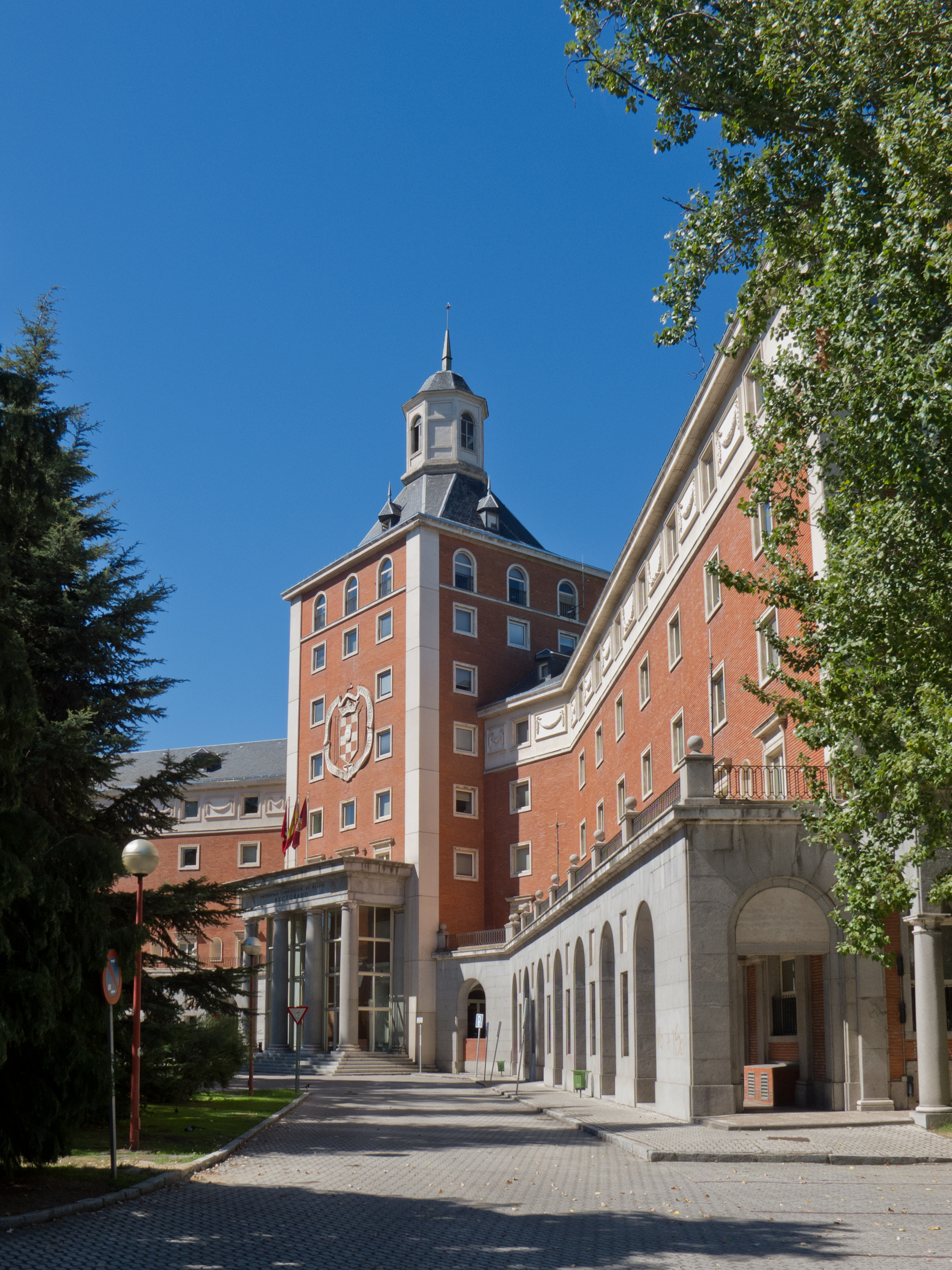
The Complutense University of Madrid.

The film was an international co-production between Spain, Italy, and the United States. Although the film was set in Boston, it was shot at the Complutense University of Madrid and in Valencia, Spain, home of director Simón. The end credits claim location filming in Boston, however the American exteriors were actually shots reused from Supersonic Man (1979), shot in New York City and also directed by Simón. The shoot lasted four weeks with the cast and crew, and another week went by to film the special effects for an estimated budget of $300,000.

According to the interview with Simón in Pieces of Juan, an interview short included on the film's 2008 DVD release, the director says that none of the female stars of the film knew how to play tennis, even though they were supposed to be portraying professional players. A tennis coach was hired so that they could learn to lob the ball in a convincing enough manner. Simón also revealed in the interview that he is proud of the visual effects in the film, especially that a pig carcass was used for the effect of the chainsaw cutting through a young woman's stomach and the slaughterhouse guts used.

=== Music ===
While the Spanish version had an original musical score by Librado Pastor, the international release used library music from several composers (including Stelvio Cipriani and Fabio Frizzi), collectively credited as 'CAM'.

== Release ==
Pieces was first released in Spain on August 23, 1982. It opened in the United States the following year in Los Angeles on October 14, 1983 through Film Ventures International.

The film has gone on to receive numerous revival screenings since its original release, often as part of the Grindhouse Film Festival.

=== Home media ===
The director's cut of Pieces (a.k.a. Mil gritos tiene la noche) appeared as a 2-disc DVD in October 2008 distributed by Grindhouse Releasing and Box Office Spectaculars. The release includes interviews with director Juan Piquer Simón and star Paul L. Smith. The two-disc deluxe edition by Grindhouse includes an optional restored original soundtrack by Spanish composer Librado Pastor, as well as numerous other bonus materials. In September 2011, the British company Arrow Video released the film on DVD in a 1.66:1 anamorphic aspect ratio version with an introduction by star Jack Taylor and a number of other extras.

Grindhouse released a double Blu-ray edition of Pieces in March 2016, which also features the soundtrack on compact disc. The Blu-ray discs include the U.S. theatrical and Spanish versions of the film, a new documentary about the history of 42nd Street called 42nd Street Memories, a re-scoring of the film, a new commentary for the U.S. version by star Jack Taylor, and the extras from the 2008 special edition DVD release. The CD includes the original soundtrack of the U.S. release of the film, a collection of library music licensed from CAM (Creazioni Artistiche Musicali), taken from the original master tapes. In addition, the first 3,000 units of the special edition included a 15-piece facsimile of the nude woman puzzle seen in the beginning of the film. This 3,000-unit limited edition, known as the "Puzzle Edition", was shipped out to customers early, and as of February 8, 2016, was sold out.

== Reception ==
=== Box office ===
Pieces grossed approximately $2 million at the United States box office.

=== Critical response ===
On the review aggregator website Rotten Tomatoes, 40% of 15 critics' reviews are positive, with an average rating of 4.1/10. Metacritic, which uses a weighted average, assigned the film a score of 68 out of 100, based on 5 critics, indicating "generally favorable" reviews.

==== Contemporary ====
Kevin Thomas, film critic for the Los Angeles Times gave the film a negative review, writing, "Pieces is a wretched, stupid little picture whose sole purpose is the exploitation of extreme violence against women", and further criticized it for being poorly dubbed and lacking suspense. Billy Kelley, entertainment writer for the Fort Lauderdale News, awarded the film no stars, describing Pieces as a "gross-out extravaganza" and a "bargain basement abomination". John A. Douglas, writing for The Grand Rapids Press, panned the film, criticizing Purdom's performance and summarizing: "The people who made this movie are only interested in showing the audience shot after shot of a chainsaw cutting through flesh—sometimes in extreme closeup." Critic Bill O'Connor of the Akron Beacon Journal similarly noted the film for its overt graphic violence.

Robert C. Trussell of The Kansas City Star criticized the film's lack of logic: "This is the sort of film in which people are fully aware that a homicidal maniac is on the loose yet loiter in dark buildings, go for midnight swims in gymnasiums and take slow walks down dimly lit streets." Scott Cain, writing for The Atlanta Journal-Constitution, noted that the film is a "gore extravaganza" that "takes place on the emptiest campus in the history of education... The ending is lurid even by slasher epic standards."

==== Retrospective ====
In a retrospective review, Alex McLevy of The A.V. Club wrote that the film's "narrative is pedestrian as hell, but damn, the execution. The movie manages to luck into that ideal combination of over-the-top bloodshed, gratuitous nudity (of both male and female types, though the latter is, as expected, the mainstage show), and unintentional absurdity for which enthusiasts of the genre are perpetually on the hunt". Bill Gibron of PopMatters wrote of the film: "Thanks to VHS and the thriving home video market, the sleazoid shocker became an instant cult classic... Pieces is the kind of fright film that sneaks up on you. It is really nothing more than your standard slasher effort with a chainsaw doing all the slice and dice (well, there are a couple of knife kills thrown in for good massacre measure)".

Meagan Navarro of Bloody Disgusting praised the film in a 2024 retrospective, writing: "Pieces has everything you could ever hope for in exploitation slasher cinema. Gratuitous nudity (both male and female), insane carnage, goofy dialogue, and an overall sense of gleeful reckless abandon makes for a film that's one of the goriest slashers of the ‘80s, and still a perfect crowd pleaser over 40 years later." Todd Gilchrist of IGN made similar praise of the film, describing it as "a work of manic inspiration whose weirdest and wildest moments are strangely as integral as the ones bound indelibly to its utterly conventional plot. It's silly, it's absurd, it makes no sense, and whole scenes come and go without a link to anything else in the film, but it may be some of the most fun you'll have being scared at the movies."

Film scholar Scott Aaron Stine was less laudatory of the film, writing that it blends elements of the giallo and the slasher film "without adding anything new to either". Scholar John Kenneth Muir said that the film features sequences "so poorly staged" that they "elicit laughter", ultimately deeming the film "utterly absurd from start to finish".

== Sources ==
- Conrich, Ian (2010). Horror Zone: The Cultural Experience of Contemporary Horror Cinema. New York City, New York: Bloomsbury Academic. ISBN 978-1-848-85151-1.
- Hobbs, Simon (2018). Cultivating Extreme Art Cinema: Text, Paratext and Home Video Culture. Edinburgh, Scotland: Edinburgh University Press. ISBN 978-1-474-42739-5.
- Muir, John Kenneth (2010). Horror Films of the 1980s. Jefferson, North Carolina: McFarland. ISBN 978-0-786-45501-0.
- Nowlan, Robert A.; Nowlan, Gregory (1991). The Films of the Eighties: A Complete, Qualitative Filmography to Over 3400 Feature-length English Language Films, Theatrical and Video-only, Released Between January 1, 1980, and December 31, 1989. Vol. 1. Jefferson, North Carolina: McFarland. ISBN 978-0-899-50560-2.
- Olivier, Marc (2020). Household Horror: Cinematic Fear and the Secret Life of Everyday Objects. Bloomington, Indiana: Indiana University Press. ISBN 978-0-253-04659-8.
- Stanley, John (2000). Creature Features: The Science Fiction, Fantasy, and Horror Movie Guide. New York: Berkeley Boulevard Books. ISBN 978-0-425-17517-0.
- Stine, Scott Aaron (2003). The Gorehound's Guide to Splatter Films of the 1980s. Jefferson, North Carolina: McFarland. ISBN 978-0-786-41532-8.
