= Moment of Danger =

1960 film by László Benedek

Moment of Danger Malaga
- Original British quad poster
- Directed by: László Benedek
- Screenplay by: David D. Osborn
- Based on: novel The Scent of Danger by Donald MacKenzie
- Starring: Trevor Howard; Dorothy Dandridge; Edmund Purdom
- Cinematography: Desmond Dickinson
- Edited by: Gerald Turney-Smith
- Music by: Matyas Seiber
- Production company: Cavalcade Films
- Distributed by: Warner-Pathé Distributors
- Release dates: 28 January 1960 (London, England)
- Running time: 97 minutes
- Country: United Kingdom
- Language: English

Moment of Danger (also known as Malaga and The Takers) is a 1960 British crime drama film starring Trevor Howard, Dorothy Dandridge and Edmund Purdom. The screenplay was by David D. Osborn based on the novel by Donald MacKenzie. It was the final completed film for Dorothy Dandridge.

== Plot ==
Starting with a wordless jewel heist pulled-off by thief Peter Curran and locksmith John Bain, Curran then double-crosses his accomplice, dumps his lover Gianna and escapes with his ill-gotten gains. In the aftermath Gianna teams up with Bain and the two of them decide to even the score with Curran, developing feelings for each other along the way.

== Cast ==
- Trevor Howard as John Bain
- Dorothy Dandridge as Gianna
- Edmund Purdom as Peter Carran
- Michael Hordern as Inspector Farrell
- Paul Stassino as Juan Montoya
- John Bailey as Cecil
- Alfred Burke as Shapley
- Peter Illing as pawnbroker
- Martin Boddey as Sir John Middleburgh

== Background ==
Before the film's release, Jet magazine said it "concerns a girl ... and a man ... who, broke and stranded, are on the run from the law...(at one point) the girl goes out and gets money as a prostitute." One author describes Michael Hordern's appearance in the movie as a "sympathetic copper who knows that Trevor Howard is a jewel thief – thanks to Howard's double-crossing partner Edmond Purdom – but lacks the evidence to make an arrest."

In some pre-release publicity, one magazine article made a point of saying that when Trevor Howard's character kissed Dorothy Dandridge's Gianna, it was the first time in her career that she had received an on-screen kiss from a white man. This was not so as the actors barely touched throughout, but director László Benedek created some strongly understated sexual tension. The actress' first screen kiss so described occurred when starring with German actor Curd Jürgens in the 1958 Italian film Tamango.

== Production ==
It was filmed in Europe in the late months of 1959.

== Release ==
The film had its premiere at the Warner Theatre in Leicester Square, London on 28 January 1960.

== Reception ==
The Monthly Film Bulletin wrote: "The opening episode, a long, carefully worked out and businesslike robbery sequence, has more tension than anything else in this romantic thriller. A few of the dialogues between Trevor Howard and Dorothy Dandridge come within sight of building up a relationship; and this, one feels, is the quality in the story that mainly interested the director. The thriller elements, certainly, maintain a decidedly low dramatic temperature; and, unhappily, the characters are never quite lively enough to make up for the shortage of conventional excitement. Trevor Howard plays with his usual bite and resolution. But the talents engaged on this production are capable of much better things than this muffled melodrama."
