= Extra Terrestrial Visitors =

1983 French-Spanish science fiction film

- Original poster
- Spanish: Los nuevos extraterrestres
- Literally: The New Extra-terrestrials
- Directed by: Juan Piquer Simón
- Written by: Joaquín Grau; Juan Piquer Simón
- Produced by: Faruk Alatan; Dick Randall; Edward L. Montoro (Note: Montoro is credited as producer of the U.S.-released version only.)
- Starring: Óscar Martín; Concha Cuetos; Manuel Pereiro
- Cinematography: Juan Mariné; Ricardo Navarrete
- Edited by: Antonio Gimeno
- Music by: Librado Pastor; Michael Demer (Note: Demer's score is used in the 1990 re-release version only.)
- Production company: Spectacular Trading Company
- Distributed by: Almena Films
- Release dates: 13 December 1983 (France); 26 November 1984 (Barcelona); 14 December 1984 (U.S.)
- Running time: 100 minutes
- Countries: Spain; France
- Language: Spanish

Extra Terrestrial Visitors (Spanish: Los nuevos extraterrestres, lit. The New Extraterrestrials) is a 1983 science fiction film directed by Juan Piquer Simón. The film's original draft was intended as a straightforward horror film about an evil alien on a murderous rampage, but the film's American producers demanded script alterations in order to cash in on the success of Steven Spielberg's E.T. the Extra-Terrestrial by featuring a child and a cute, lovable alien.

A French-Spanish co-production, the film was first released theatrically in France and in Spain (Barcelona) nearly one year later. In the United States, it was sometimes known by the alternate title The Unearthling, and was aired on television bearing this name. The film was largely forgotten until 1991, when it was lampooned by B movie-mocking cult TV series Mystery Science Theater 3000, which used a print by Film Ventures International with the title Pod People.

== Plot ==
In the foggy woods of New England, three egg poachers, Matt, Sam, and Burt are hunting nightingale eggs. When Sam sees what he thinks is a meteor crash nearby, he decides to investigate. He finds a red glowing cave with a stash of large eggs, which he smashes out of fear. Before he can finish, he is killed by an unseen entity, leaving one egg intact. The mysterious being takes revenge for the destruction, first killing the other hunters and then going after members of a pop band led by the arrogant Rick, who are on a weekend camping trip. The band is accompanied by Laura, a girl whom Rick met and told about the weekend's plans, not expecting her to want to come along. Sharon, a member of the band and Rick's girlfriend, is jealous of Laura. Cathy and Tracy are also band members.

Tommy (Oscar Martin) is a young boy living in a secluded house with his mother Molly and his short-tempered uncle Bill. He also finds the cave, and brings the remaining egg home where it hatches. The bald-headed, shaggy-bodied creature from the egg grows rapidly overnight until it is as large as Tommy. Tommy nicknames it "Trumpy" because he has a short, trumpet-like trunk. Tommy and Trumpy quickly become playmates. At one point, Tommy asks Trumpy where he is from. Trumpy indicates a star map which features the Big Dipper prominently. It also becomes clear that Trumpy has developed telekinetic powers around this time, as it flings various objects around Tommy's room. While the mother alien continues to look for her missing offspring, the pop band stops at Tommy's house for medical care after Laura encounters the alien mother and falls off of a cliff, later dying in the house. A strange dot formation (similar to the Big Dipper) is later seen on her forehead.

Rick's friend Brian and uncle Bill go to a nearby ranger station to use the radio. There they encounter the alien mother, as well as the body of a second poacher, which also bears the dot pattern. The alien kills Brian while Bill flees to the cabin. The alien arrives first, however, and kills Tracy in the band's camper. Tommy witnesses the attack through his telescope. The survivors decide to hole up in the cabin until the next day.

Trumpy's mother sneaks into the house and kills Cathy while she is taking a shower. The survivors attempt to come to her rescue when they hear Cathy screaming, and Bill manages to wound the alien with a wild shot. Bill and Rick vow to catch Trumpy's mother before she can escape, so Rick takes one of Bill's rifles and they go in pursuit of the alien.

Immediately after they leave, Trumpy appears, scaring Molly and Sharon. Molly grabs a rifle and aims to shoot Trumpy, but Tommy protects his alien friend and hustles Trumpy into the woods. Molly and Sharon give chase, searching for Tommy, Rick, and Bill in the gloom.

Eventually Trumpy and his mother reunite briefly before Rick and Bill find them. The alien mother attacks Bill, who shoots her once before being killed. Rick then fatally shoots the alien mother, who falls to the ground and disintegrates as she dies. Trumpy and Tommy disappear in the woods to say their goodbyes before Tommy reunites with his mother Molly, Sharon, and Rick. The film ends with Trumpy moving deeper into the woods; Tommy, Molly, Sharon, and Rick head back to the cabin.

== Cast ==
- Ian Serra as Rick (credited as Ian Sera)
- Nina Ferrer as Sharon
- Susana Bequer as Lara Stapleton (credited as Susan Blake)
- Sara Palmer as Kathy
- Óscar Martín as Tommy Stevens
- Maria Albert as Tracy
- Emilio Linder as Brian (credited as Emil Linder)
- Concha Cuetos as Molly Stevens (credited as Connie Cheston)
- Manuel Pereiro as Bill Stevens
- Frank Braña as Burt

== Production ==
Extra Terrestrial Visitors was a French-Spanish co-production, with filming taking place in Madrid. The cast were largely Spanish actors, though the film was shot in both Spanish and French, and dubbed in post-production.

== Release ==
Extra Terrestrial Visitors was first released theatrically in France. It was sometimes screened on American television under the alternate title The Unearthling.

In 1990, the film was acquired for U.S. television distribution by Film Ventures International, who retitled it Pod People. This release featured an opening credits that utilized footage from the similar but unrelated film The Galaxy Invader (1985).

== Reception and legacy ==
Chris Morgan, reviewing the Pod People version of the film, deemed it "one of the worst movies I have ever seen, but fortunately it is bad in a way that is funny."

=== Mystery Science Theater 3000 ===
Extra Terrestrial Visitors gained some popularity in 1991 after it was lampooned by the B movie series Mystery Science Theater 3000 (MST3K), which aired a print sourced from Film Ventures International in which the film was retitled Pod People. The episode aired in the summer of 1991.

In common with Cave Dwellers, another Film Ventures International release spoofed by MST3K, the opening and end credits for Pod People are superimposed over blurred footage from an entirely unrelated movie, in this case The Galaxy Invader (1985). The latter film would later be spoofed by Mike Nelson, Bill Corbett, and Kevin Murphy for RiffTrax in 2011. Pod People was selected by fans to be in the MST3K 2016 and 2020 Turkey Day Marathon.

The fictional pop band's performance of "Hear the Engines Roll" (Spanish: "Rugen los motores", lit. "The engines roar") in Pod People is lampooned for its unintelligible lyrics, specifically the chorus, "hear the engines roll now", interpreted by the MST3K cast as "hideous control now", "idiot control now", and other variations. The lead singer's after-song hand gesture of OK, smiling, and saying, "It stinks!" became a recurring in-joke on the series.

=== Home media ===
In 1985, the film was released on VHS in Canada, licensed by Cinema Shares International, under the title The Unearthling. In the United Kingdom, a VHS was released under the title E.T.: The Second Coming.

The Mystery Science Theater 3000 version of the film was released by Rhino Home Video as part of the Collection, Volume 2 DVD set, which was re-released by Shout Factory in a multi-film set on 24 May 2016. The film itself was released on DVD in 2005 by Substance. It was re-released on Blu-ray by Severin Films on 27 June 2023.

== Sources ==
- Hughes, Howard (2014). Outer Limits: The Filmgoers' Guide to the Great Science-Fiction Films. New York City, New York: Bloomsbury USA. ISBN 978-0-857-72393-2.
- Morgan, Chris (2015). The Comic Galaxy of Mystery Science Theater 3000: Twelve Classic Episodes and the Movies They Lampoon. Jefferson, North Carolina: McFarland. ISBN 978-1-476-61883-8.
- Sipos, Thomas M. (2014). Horror Film Aesthetics: Creating the Visual Language of Fear. Jefferson, North Carolina: McFarland. ISBN 978-0-786-45834-9.
