= Death on High Mountain =

1969 film directed by Fred Ringold

- Italian: La morte sull'alta collina
- Directed by: Fred Ringold
- Screenplay by: Enzo Gicca Palli; José Mallorquí Figueroa; Eduardo M. Brochero
- Story by: Enzo Gicca Palli
- Produced by: Eduardo Manzanos; Bruno Turchetto
- Cinematography: Julio Ortas
- Edited by: Antonietta Zita
- Music by: Luis Enríquez
- Production companies: Films Concorde; Copercines, Cooperativa Cinematográfica
- Distributed by: Euro International Film; Condor; Distribuidora Cinematográfica Internacional; Loving the Classics
- Release date: 25 January 1969 (Italy)
- Running time: 98 min
- Countries: Spain; Italy

Death on High Mountain (Italian: La morte sull'alta collina) is a 1969 Italian-Spanish western film directed by Fred Ringold, written by Enzo Gicca Palli and José Mallorquí Figueroa, produced by Bruno Turchetto and scored by Luis Enríquez. It stars Agnès Spaak, Frank Brana, and Jesús Guzmán.

== Cast ==
- Peter Lee Lawrence as Loring Vandervelt
- Louis Dawson as Francis Parker / Mark Harrison
- Tano Cimarosa as General Valiente
- Agnès Spaak as Daphne Vandervelt
- Antonio Gradoli as Frank Braddock
- Giovanni Pazzafini as Billiard Player
- Silvio Bagolini as Stevens
- Giampiero Littera as Sheriff
- Barbara Carroll as Arlena Braddock
- Jesús Areta as Agustine
- Frank Braña as Captain Young (as Francisco Braña)
- Romano Puppo as Deputy
- Rafael Hernández as Curling
