= Juan Piquer Simón =

Spanish film director (1935 – 2011)

- Born: 16 February 1935; Valencia, Spain
- Died: 8 January 2011 (aged 75); Valencia, Spain
- Occupation: film director

Juan Piquer Simón (16 February 1935 – 8 January 2011) was a Spanish film director best known for directing two cult classic horror exploitation films, Pieces (1982) and Slugs: The Movie (1988).

== Career ==
Simón also directed two Jules Verne-based films, Where Time Began (1976) and Mystery on Monster Island (1981), as well as Supersonic Man in 1979 (which was spoofed by RiffTrax), and Extra Terrestrial Visitors in 1983, which was famously featured on an episode of Mystery Science Theater 3000 under the title Pod People. He also directed Cthulhu Mansion and The Rift, both in 1990.

== Legacy ==
Pieces is one among the many cult classic horror films that have been restored and digitally remastered by Bob Murawski of Box Office Spectaculars and Grindhouse Releasing. Juan Piquer Simón owned his own independent studio in Madrid, Spain, and designed many of his own special effects sequences for his films. He also was the co-director of the Mediterranean Film Festival in Valencia, Spain. He died in 2011 at age 75 of lung cancer.

Pod People has since become a favorite for MST3K fans and the show's creator Joel Hodgson.

== Filmography ==
As film director:

- España Violenta (1964)
- Vida Y Paz (1965)
- Where Time Began (1976)
- Supersonic Man (1979)
- Jules Verne's Mystery on Monster Island (1981)
- Los Diablos Del Mar (1982)
- Pieces (1982)
- Extra Terrestrial Visitors (1983)
- Dirty War (1984)
- Slugs (1988)
- The Rift (1990)
- Cthulhu Mansion (1990)
- La Isla Del Diablo (1994)
- Manoa, La Ciudad De Oro (1999)

As film actor:

- Pieces (1982) - Killer's Hands / Crime Scene Photographer (uncredited)

Interview:

- Pieces of Juan (as himself), an interview with Juan Piquer Simón about his film, Pieces, as well as his life and career (directed by Nacho Cerdà, available on Grindhouse Releasing / Box Office Spectaculars' North American DVD release of Pieces)
