= Godfrey Morgan =

1882 adventure novel by Jules Verne

Godfrey Morgan: A Californian Mystery
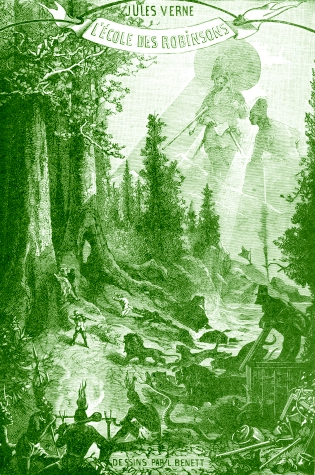
- Original illustration of Jules Verne's L'École des Robinsons
- Author: Jules Verne
- Original title: L'École des Robinsons
- Illustrator: Léon Benett
- Language: French
- Series: The Extraordinary Voyages #22
- Genre: Adventure novel
- Publisher: Pierre-Jules Hetzel
- Publication date: 1882
- Publication place: France
- English publication date: 1883
- Media type: Print (Hardback)
- ISBN: 978-1515089131
- Preceded by: The Giant Raft
- Followed by: The Green Ray

Godfrey Morgan: A Californian Mystery (French: L'École des Robinsons, literally The School for Robinsons), also published as School for Crusoes, is an 1882 adventure novel by French writer Jules Verne. The novel tells of a wealthy young man, Godfrey Morgan, who, with his deportment instructor, Professor T. Artelett, embark from San Francisco, California, on a round-the-world ocean voyage. They are cast away on an uninhabited Pacific island, where they must endure a series of adversities. Later, they encounter an African slave, Carefinotu, brought to the island by cannibals. In the end, the trio manage to work together and survive on the island.

The novel is a robinsonade – a play on Daniel Defoe's 1719 novel Robinson Crusoe.

== Plot summary ==
The narrative begins with the auction by the US Government of the fictional Spencer Island, located 460 miles off the California coast (32°15′N 145°18′W). The island is uninhabited and there are only two bidders: William W. Kolderup, a very wealthy San Franciscan, and his arch-rival J. R. Taskinar, a resident of Stockton, California. Kolderup wins the auction, buying Spencer Island for four million dollars. Taskinar mutters, "I will be avenged!" before retiring to his hotel.

Godfrey, an idle twenty-two-year-old, lives with Kolderup (his uncle) and Kolderup's adopted god-daughter, Phina, whom Godfrey has grown to love. Prior to marrying Phina, Godfrey asks to undertake a world tour. Acceding to his nephew's desire, Kolderup sends Godfrey on a sea voyage around the world, aboard one of his steamships, the Dream, commanded by Captain Turcott. Godfrey is accompanied by his mentor, teacher, and dance instructor, Professor T. Artelett (aka "Tartlet").

After some time at sea, Godfrey is awakened one foggy night and told to abandon ship as the Dream is foundering. After jumping into the sea, Godfrey is washed ashore on a deserted island, where he soon finds Tartlet has also been marooned. Godfrey, with scant help from Tartlet, will have to learn to survive, organize his life, face hostile intruders, and overcome other obstacles. Eventually, they are also joined by the African slave Carefinotu, whom Godfrey rescues from Polynesian warriors visiting the island. By the end of the story, the formerly-jaded Godfrey has discovered the value of independent effort, and he gains poise and courage. The marooned group are rescued and returned to San Francisco, where Godfrey is reunited with Phina. They agree to marry before continuing Godfrey's world tour, this time together.

== Theme ==
Although the setting is different, the robinsonade plot is a variation on the theme of rational self-sufficiency that Verne developed earlier in The Mysterious Island (1874). At the time of publication, it was common for a young man of wealth to undertake travel as an educational rite of passage; for example, the California heir Leland Stanford, Jr. took two European Grand Tours: one in 1880-81, and the second in 1884, during which he died. The original French version of Verne's novel was published in 1882, after Stanford's first tour.

== Film adaptation ==
The novel was adapted (very loosely) as a 1981 USA/Spain co-production by director Juan Piquer Simón, titled Jules Verne's Mystery on Monster Island (Spanish: Misterio en Isla de los Monstruos), starring Peter Cushing and Terence Stamp, with David Hatton, Ian Sera, Paul Naschy, Blanca Estrada, Ana Obregón, and Frank Braña in supporting roles. Monsters, prominently included as an element in the film (and which are also fake made by famous toymakers), were absent from the novel, in which the villain J. R. Taskinar introduces non-indigenous carnivores to the island to take revenge on Kolderup for his auction win. Despite its similar title, the film has no connection with the better-known Verne novel The Mysterious Island (1875), though some reviewers have disregarded this. Peter Cushing and Paul Naschy both have very brief cameo appearances in the film, and do not share any scenes. In 2007, the film was released on DVD by 20th Century Fox as part of a double feature with Gorilla at Large (1954).

== See also ==
- Robinson Crusoe
- The Swiss Family Robinson
- The Mysterious Island
