= Where Time Began =

1977 film directed by Juan Piquer Simón

- Spanish theatrical release poster
- Directed by: Juan Piquer Simón
- Written by: Carlos Puerto; Juan Piquer Simón; John Melson
- Based on: Journey to the Center of the Earth (1864 novel) by Jules Verne
- Starring: Kenneth More; Pep Munné; Ivonne Sentis; Frank Braña; Jack Taylor
- Cinematography: Andrés Berenguer
- Edited by: Derek Parsons; María Luisa Soriano
- Music by: Juan José García Caffi; Juan Carlos Calderón
- Production company: Almena Films
- Distributed by: Jacinto Santos Parrás
- Release date: November 1978
- Running time: 90 minutes
- Country: Spain
- Language: Spanish

Where Time Began (Spanish: Viaje al centro de la Tierra, lit. 'Journey to the Center of the Earth') is a 1977 Spanish science fantasy adventure film co-written and directed by Juan Piquer Simón, based on the 1864 novel Journey to the Center of the Earth by Jules Verne. It stars Kenneth More, Pep Munné, Ivonne Sentis, Frank Braña, and Jack Taylor.

== Plot ==
A group of geologists, including Professor Otto Lidenbrock, discuss various theories on the make-up of the interior of the Earth. They decide that the only way to know for sure would be to mount an expedition to discover which theory was true.

Whilst visiting a bookshop, Lidenbrock buys an old book, written by Arne Saknussemm, containing undisclosed, coded knowledge of the centre of the Earth from a mysterious gentleman. Eager to know more, he enlists his niece Grauben and her fiancé Axel, a soldier. Axel is charged with keeping a diary of the journey.

Upon arriving in Iceland, they hire shepherd and mountaineer Hans. Together, the four of them set off for the adventure of a lifetime to the centre of the Earth. The group lose their water stores when Grauben drops them, she then falls into a bog and is only saved by the intervention of a mysterious stranger who has been following them. Desperate for water and losing the mysterious book, the group attempt to find water by breaking through a stone wall. The stranger reveals himself to help them: he is Olsen, a fellow scientist also on a mission to explore the underground world.

The group find and travel across a huge underground ocean on a raft built by Hans. They discover giant fungi, dinosaurs, giant apes, sea creatures and tortoises, extinct on the surface for millions of years. Lidenbrock works out they have travelled to an area underneath the Mediterranean sea. The group reaches land where Olsen reveals to Grauben and Axel the existence of a city. They see a laboratory where men who all resemble Olsen are conducting experiments. Olsen tells Lidenbrock that time is relative and not absolute. The group find a grotto which is the end of their journey with no path forward. Lidenbrock stubbornly attempts to continue by breaking through a stone wall, distraught, Grauben requests Olsen's help. He uses his mysterious box to set off an explosion which allows water to flood into the grotto elevating the raft back to the surface, where they escape amidst a volcano erupting.

Some years later, Grauben and Axel are married, and Hans has become a successful shepherd. Lidenbrock still searches old bookshops, hoping for more information. In one of those shops, Lidenbrock is told that a package has been left for him, and it proves to be Olsen's box. Looking through the shop window, Lidenbrock sees Olsen, now an old man, looking back at him.

== Cast ==
- Kenneth More as Professor Otto Lidenbrock
- Pep Munné as Axel (dubbed by Christopher Guard)
- Ivonne Sentis as Glauben (dubbed by Deborah Watling)
- Frank Braña as Hans
- Jack Taylor as Olsen
- Emiliano Redondo as Professor Kristoff
- Lone Fleming as Molly
- Ricardo Palacios as a train ticket collector
- José María Caffarel as a professor
- George Rigaud as a professor (as Jorge Rigaud)
- Barta Barri as a professor
- Ángel Álvarez as a professor

== Reception ==
Creature Feature found the movie to be sluggish and boring, giving it two out of five stars. It found the movie did improve when the dinosaurs finally appeared, but that the effects were weak. Monster Hunter found the use of shooting in a real cave to be a plus, but that there was little else of worth in the film.

== Home media ==
The film was released on DVD in 2006. And on Blu-Ray by Severin Films on August 29, 2023.

== See also ==
- List of films featuring dinosaurs
- Journey to the Center of the Earth (1959 film)
- Journey to the Center of the Earth (2008 Hollywood film)
- Journey to the Center of the Earth (2008 Asylum film)
