= Supersonic Man =

- Directed by: Juan Piquer
- Screenplay by: Tonino Moi; Juan Piquer
- Produced by: Dick Randall; Faruk Alatan
- Starring: Michael Coby; Cameron Mitchell; Diana Plakow
- Cinematography: Juan Marine
- Edited by: Pedro del Rey; George Akers
- Music by: Gin Peguri; Juan Luis Izaguirre
- Production company: Almena Films
- Distributed by: Filmayer S.A.
- Release date: 6 August 1979
- Running time: 88 minutes
- Country: Spain
- Language: Spanish

Supersonic Man is a 1979 Spanish superhero film directed by Juan Piquer Simón, and starring Antonio Cantafora and Cameron Mitchell.

== Plot ==
Kronos, a humanoid extraterrestrial (Richard Yesteran), has been sent to planet Earth in order to help humanity against its own threats. Settling in New York City, he becomes a superhero, Supersonic Man. He confronts nefarious Dr. Gulik (Cameron Mitchell) who plans to take over the world.

== Cast ==
- Antonio Cantafora - Paul (credited as Michael Coby)
- Cameron Mitchell - Dr. Gulik (credited as Cameron Mitchel)
- Diana Polakov - Patricia Morgan
- Frank Braña - Peterson
- José María Caffarel - Professor Morgan (credited as John Caffarel)
- José Luis Ayestarán - Kronos / Supersonic (credited as Richard Yesteran)

== Release ==
Supersonic Man was distributed in Spain by Filmayer S.A. on 6 August 1979. It sold 751,696 tickets on its Spanish release. It was the last film seen on WFLD's version of Svengoolie (titled Son of Svengoolie) before it was cancelled in 1986.

== Reception ==
From contemporary reviews, John Pym wrote in Monthly Film Bulletin that the film "is a cut-price digest of half-a-dozen money spinners, from the Bond movies to Star Wars."

== See also ==
- Italo disco
- The Pumaman - 1980 film similar in content
