= List of works by Arnold Bennett =

The English novelist, journalist and playwright Arnold Bennett wrote prolifically between 1898 and his death in 1931. This is a list of his published books and adaptations of his works for stage and screen.

== Fiction ==
=== Novels ===
Title	Subtitle	Date (UK)	Date (US)	Notes	Public domain audiobook
A Man from the North		1898	1898		
Anna of the Five Towns	A novel	1902	1903		
The Grand Babylon Hotel	A fantasia on modern themes	1902	1902	First published serially from February 1901. Published in US as Racksole and Daughter	
The Gates of Wrath	A melodrama	1903	––	First published serially from October 1899	
Leonora		1903	1910		
A Great Man	A frolic	1904	1910		
Teresa of Watling Street	A fantasia on modern themes	1904	––		
Sacred and Profane Love	A novel in three episodes	1905	1911	Revised edition published in US as The Book of Carlotta	
Hugo	A fantasia on modern themes	1906	1906	First published serially from May 1905	
Whom God Hath Joined		1906	1911		
The Sinews of War	A romance of London and the sea	1906	1906	Written in collaboration with Eden Phillpotts. First published serially from March 1906. Published in US as Doubloons	
The Ghost	A fantasia on modern themes	1907	1907		
The City of Pleasure	A fantasia on modern themes	1907	1915	First published serially from January 1906	
The Statue		1908	1908	With Philpotts	
Buried Alive	A tale of these days	1908	1910		
The Old Wives' Tale	A novel	1908	1911		
The Glimpse	An adventure of the soul	1909	1909		
Helen with the High Hand	An idyllic diversion	1910	1910	First published serially from June 1909 as The Miser's Niece	
Clayhanger		1910			
The Card	A story of adventure in the Five Towns	1911	1911	First published serially from February 1910 as Denry the Audacious and published in the US under that title	
Hilda Lessways		1911	1911	Second volume of Clayhanger trilogy	
The Regent	A Five Towns story of adventure in London	1913		Sequel to The Card. First published serially from November 1912 (UK) and December 1912 (US). Published in the US as The Old Adam	
The Price of Love	A tale	1914	1914	First published serially from December 1913	
These Twain		1916	1915	Third volume of Clayhanger trilogy. First published serially from September 1915	
The Lion's Share		1916	1916	First published serially from October 1915	
The Pretty Lady	A novel	1918	1918		
The Roll-Call		1918	1918	Sequel to the Clayhanger trilogy	
Mr Prohack		1922	1922	First published serially from July 1921	
Lilian		1922	1922	First published serially from July 1922	
Riceyman Steps	A novel	1923	1923		
Lord Raingo		1926	1926	First published serially from September 1926	
The Vanguard	A fantasia	1928	1927	Published in UK as The Strange Vanguard	
Accident		1929	1928	First published serially as Train de luxe from July 1928	
Imperial Palace		1930	1930		
Dream of Destiny		1932	1932	Unfinished novel	

Sources: New Cambridge Bibliography of English Literature and Arnold Bennett by Margaret Drabble.

=== Short story collections ===
- The Loot of Cities: Being the Adventures of a Millionaire in Search of Joy 1905

The Loot of Cities; Mr Penfound's two Burglars; Midnight at the Grand Babylon; The Police Station; The Adventure of the Prima Donna; The Episode in Room 222; Saturday to Monday; A Dinner at the Louvre

- Tales of the Five Towns 1905

At Home; His Worship the Goose Driver; The Elixir of Youth; Mary with the High Hand; The Dog; A Feud; Phantom; Tiddy-Fol-Lol; The Idiot; Abroad; Hungarian Rhapsody; The Sisters Quita; Nocturne at the Majestic; Clarice of the Autumn Concerts; A Letter Home (written in 1893)

- The Grim Smile of the Five Towns 1907

The Lion's Share; The Baby's Bath; The Silent Brothers; The Nineteenth Hat; Vera's First Christmas Adventure; The Murder of the Mandarin; Vera’s Second Christmas Adventure; The Burglary; The News of the Engagement; Beginning the New Year; From one Generation to Another; The Death of Simon Fuge; In a New Bottle

- The Matador of the Five Towns 1912

Tragedy: The Matador of the Five Towns; Mimi; The Supreme Illusion; The Letter and the Lie; The Glimpse; Frolic: Jock-at-a-Venture; The Heroism of Thomas Chadwick; Under the Clock; Three episodes of the life of Mr Cowlishaw, dentist; Catching the Train; The Widow at the Balcony; The Cat and Cupid; The Fortune Teller; The Long-lost Uncle; The Tight Hand; Why the Clock Stopped; Hot Potatoes; Half a Sovereign; The Blue Suit; The Tiger and the Baby; The Revolver; An Unfair Advantage

- Elsie and the Child, and other stories 1924

Elsie and the Child; During Dinner; The Paper Cap; The Box-Office Girl; Mr Jack Hollins against Fate; Nine o'clock To-morrow; The Yacht; Outside and Inside; Last Love; The Mysterious Destruction of Mr Ipple; The Perfect Creature; The Fish; The Limits of Dominion

- The Woman who Stole Everything, and other stories 1927

The Woman who Stole Everything; A Place in Venice; The Toreador; Middle-aged; The Umbrella; House to Let; Claribel; Time to think; One of their Quarrels

- The Night Visitor and other stories 1931

The Night Visitor; The Cornet-Player; Murder; The Hat; Under the Hammer; The Wind; Honour; The First Night; The Seven Policemen; Myrtle at 6 a.m.; Strange Affair at an Hotel; The Second Night; The Understudy; The Peacock; Dream; Baccarat; The Mouse and the Cat

- "Uncollected Short Stories 1892-1932" (pub 2010)

He Needn’t Have Troubled How He Looked; The Artist’s Model; In a Hospital. A Broken-Off Match; The Heavenly Twins on the Revolt of the Daughters; A Modern Girl. The Revolt of me Daughter; The Silken Serpent. A Fantasia; A First Night. ‘The Floodgates of Society’; Strange Story. In the Matter of a Letter and a Lady; Five O’Clock at the Heroines’ Club. A Fantasy; Rejected. A Girl and Another Girl; An Academy Work. The Mutilation of a Statue; Fenella: A Manx Idyll; ‘My First Book’; The Repentance of Ronald Primula; A Divided Ghost; The Clapham Theosophical Society; An Astral Engagement; The Fatal Marriage; Dr Anna Jekyll and Miss Hyde; The Phantasm of My Grandmother; The Crystal-Gazers; A Little Deal in ‘Kaffirs’; The Adamless Eden. A new Fairytale; John and the Lovely Stranger; The Marriage of Jane Hendra; The Christmas Chimes of Malyprès; Dragons of the Night; The Great Fire at Santa Claus’ House; The Romance of Bobby Lempriere; The Scratched Face; A Millionaire’s Wife; The Phantom Sneeze; The Strange Shelter; The Railway Station; The Farlls and a Woman; The White Feather; The Life of Nash Nicklin; The Muscovy Ducks; The Great Huntress; Leading to Marriage; The Flight

- Lord Dover & Other Lost Stories (pub 2011)

Lord Dover; What’s Bred in the Bone; The Advanced Woman; Restaurant Spooks; The Renaissance of the Romp; Little Popow; Varnish and Vanity at the RA; On Growing Old; The Train; How Percy Goes to the Office; The Inner-Circle Express; Stella’s Journey; The Clock; The Fortress; The Power of Love; Miss Scrooge; The Lure of Life; The Alarm; What Men Want

== Stage and screen ==
- Polite Farces for the Drawing Room (contains The Stepmother, A Good Woman and A Question of Sex) 1899
- Cupid and Commonsense (dramatisation of The Old Wives' Tale) 1908
- What the Public Wants 1909
- The Honeymoon 1911
- Milestones (with Edward Knoblock) 1912
- The Great Adventure 1913
- The Title 1918
- "The Wedding Dress" (film scenario) 1920
- Sacred and Profane Love (based on the 1903 novel) 1919
- Judith 1922
- The Love Match 1922
- Body and Soul 1922
- Don Juan de Maraña 1923
- London Life (with Knoblock) 1924
- The Bright Island 1924
- The Only Way film scenario 1926
- Mr Prohack 1927 (with Knoblock, based on the 1922 novel)
- The Return Journey 1928
- "Punch and Judy" (film scenario) 1928
- Piccadilly film screenplay 1929
- Judith libretto for one-act opera, based on his 1922 play; music by Eugene Goossens 1929
- Don Juan de Maraña libretto for four-act opera, based on his 1923 play, music by Goossens. Libretto completed in 1931; opera premiered (Covent Garden) 1937

== Non-fiction ==
- Journalism for Women 1898
- Fame and Fiction (collected criticism) 1901
- The Truth about an Author (autobiographical) 1903
- How to Become an Author: A Practical Guide 1903
- The Reasonable Life 1907
- The Human Machine: A Pocket Philosophy 1909
- Literary Taste: How to Form It 1909
- How to Live on 24 Hours a Day 1910
- The Feast of St Friend: A Christmas Book 1911 (published in the US and in later British editions as Friendship and Happiness)
- Mental Efficiency, and Other Hints to Men and Women 1911
- Those United States 1912 (published in the US as Your United States)
- The Plain Man and His Wife 1913
- Paris Nights and Other Impressions of Places and People 1913
- The Author's Craft 1914
- From the Log of the Velsa (travel sketches, published in the US in 1914 and in Britain in 1920)
- Liberty: A Statement of the British Case 1914
- Over There: War Scenes on the Western Front 1915
- Books and Persons: Selections from The New Age 1908–1911) 1917
- Self and Self-Management 1918
- Our Women: Chapters on Sex-Discord 1920
- The Art of A. E. Rickards 1920
- Things That Have Interested Me 1921
- Things That Have Interested Me (second series) 1923
- How to Make the Best of Life 1923
- How to Live 1925; consisting of "How to Live on 24 Hours a Day", "The Human Machine", "Mental Efficiency", and "Self and Self-Management"
- Things That Have Interested Me (third series) 1926
- The Savour of Life: Essays in Gusto 1928
- The Religious Interregnum 1929

=== Journals ===
- Volumes 1 and 2 (1896–1921), edited by Newman Flower, 1932
- Volume (1921–1928), edited by Flower, 1933
- Journal for 1929, edited by Bennett, 1930
- Selections from the complete journals, edited and selected by Frank Swinnerton, 1954 (revised edition, with additions, 1971)
- Florentine Journal, 1910 with illustrations by Bennett, 1967

=== Letters ===
- The Letters of Arnold Bennett edited by James Hepburn, four volumes, 1966–1986

Sources: Arnold Bennett by Frank Swinnerton; Arnold Bennett by Margaret Drabble.

== Adaptations by others ==
=== Cinema ===
- The Grand Babylon Hotel (1916)
- Milestones (1916)
- Milestones (1920)
- The Great Adventure (1921)
- The Old Wives' Tale (1921)
- The Card (1922)
- His Double Life (1933)
- Holy Matrimony (1943)
- Dear Mr. Prohack (1949)
- The Card (1952)

=== Television ===
- The Great Adventure: BBC 1939, with D. A. Clarke-Smith, Marda Vanne and Felix Aylmer
- The Great Adventure: BBC 1947, with Harold Scott, Iris Baker and Richard Goolden
- The Title: BBC 1950, with Jill Esmond and Raymond Huntley
- Milestones: BBC 1950, with Michael Denison and Dulcie Gray
- The Great Adventure: BBC 1958, with Margaret Lockwood and Alec Clunes
- Hilda Lessways: BBC 1959 – six-part dramatisation of Clayhanger and Hilda Lessways, with Judi Dench
- What the Public Wants: BBC 1959, with Patrick Wymark, Dulcie Gray and Hugh Burden
- The Old Wives' Tale: BBC 1964 – five-part dramatisation, with Frances Cuka and Lana Morris
- Lord Raingo: BBC 1966 – four-part dramatisation, with Kenneth More
- Imperial Palace: BBC 1969 – four-part dramatisation, with Roy Dotrice and Cyril Luckham
- Whom God Hath Joined: BBC 1970, with Brian Blessed
- The Price of Love: BBC 1970, with Stephan Chase
- Clayhanger ATV 1976 – 26-part adaptation by Douglas Livingstone of Clayhanger, Hilda Lessways and These Twain, with Peter McEnery, Denis Quilley, Janet Suzman and Harry Andrews
- Anna of the Five Towns: BBC 1985 – four-part dramatisation by John Harvey, with Lynsey Beauchamp, Emrys James, Peter Davison, Anton Lesser and Anna Cropper
- Sophia and Constance: BBC 1988 – six-part dramatisation of The Old Wives' Tale by John Harvey, with Lynsey Beauchamp, Katy Behean and Patricia Routledge

Sources: BBC Genome and British Film Institute.

=== Stage ===
- Clayhanger: adapted by Joyce Cheeseman and Peter Terson, Victoria Theatre, Stoke-on-Trent, November 1967
- Anna of the Five Towns: adapted by Joyce Cheeseman, Victoria Theatre, Stoke-on-Trent, August 1969
- The Old Wives’ Tale: adapted by Joyce Cheeseman, Victoria Theatre, Stoke-on-Trent, August 1971
- The Card: adapted by Joyce Cheeseman, Victoria Theatre, Stoke-on-Trent, August 1973 and New Vic Theatre, October 1991. Also adapted by Deborah McAndrew for Claybody Theatre Company, Stoke-on-Trent, 2022
- Riceyman Steps: adapted by Joyce Cheeseman, Victoria Theatre, Stoke-on-Trent, September 1982
- Buried Alive: adapted by Joyce Holliday (formerly Cheeseman), New Vic, March 1988
- The Pretty Lady: adapted by Joyce Holliday, New Vic, September 1990

Source: Victoria Theatre Collection, Special Collections, Thompson Library, Staffordshire University

== Sources ==
- Drabble, Margaret (1974). Arnold Bennett. London: Weidenfeld and Nicolson. ISBN 978-0-297-76733-6.
- Swinnerton, Frank (1950). Arnold Bennett. London and New York: Longman. OCLC 1148037250.
- Watson, George; Ian R. Willison (1972). The New Cambridge Bibliography of English Literature, Volume 4. Cambridge: Cambridge University Press. ISBN 978-0-521-08535-9.
