= 1912 in literature =

This article contains information about the literary events and publications of 1912.

== Events ==
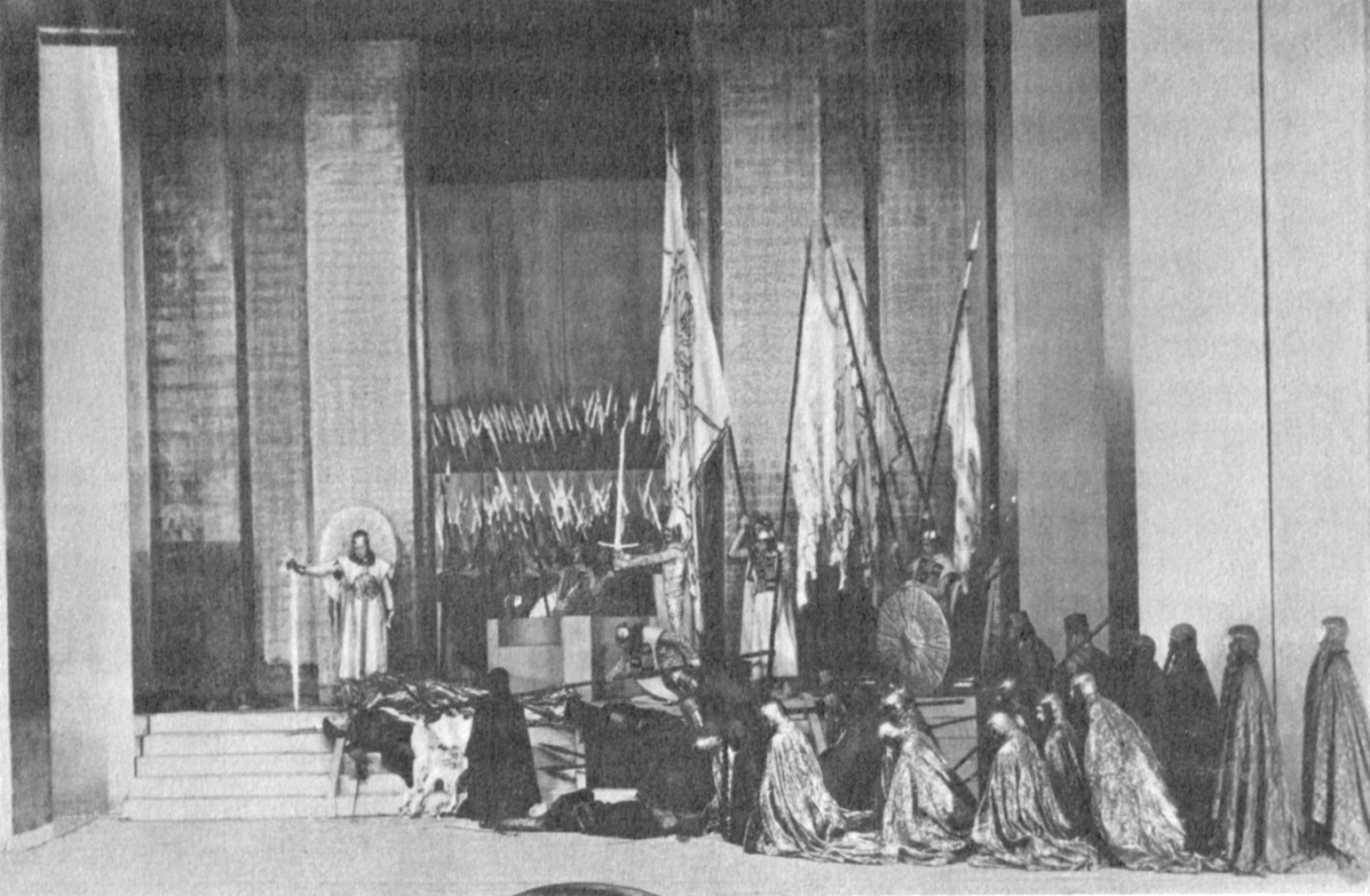
Moscow Art Theatre production of Hamlet

- January 5 (December 23, 1911 O.S.) – Konstantin Stanislavski and Edward Gordon Craig's seminal symbolist Moscow Art Theater production of Hamlet opens.
- January 21 – Joseph Conrad achieves his first popular success as the New York Herald begins serializing his novel Chance. He broke off with it in 1906, but sold the rights to the unfinished work in June 1911. Conrad continues to work on the book, while the first chapters appear weekly in the Herald. He completes it on March 26.
- March 3 – Frieda Weekley meets D. H. Lawrence in Nottingham.
- April 14–15 – The ocean liner RMS Titanic strikes an iceberg and sinks on her maiden voyage from the United Kingdom to the United States. American mystery writer Jacques Futrelle, English journalist and publisher William Thomas Stead and American bibliophile Harry Elkins Widener are among over 1500 dead. A copy of the Rubaiyat of Omar Khayyam in a jeweled binding by Sangorski & Sutcliffe (1911) is also lost. The event leads to a flood of poems, including Thomas Hardy's "The Convergence of the Twain".
- May – Following the death of Lie Kim Hok from typhus in Batavia, Dutch East Indies, aged 58, Lauw Giok Lan takes on the work of completing his translations from the Dutch of Hugo Hartmann's Dolores, de Verkochte Vrouw into Sundanese as Prampoean jang Terdjoewal and of Geneviève de Vadans as De Juffrouw van Gezelschap.
- June – Under the name I. G. Ofir, the Romanian poet Benjamin Fondane makes his publishing debut in the Iași magazine Floare Albastră, put out by A. L. Zissu.
- August 10 – Virginia Stephen marries Leonard Woolf at St Pancras Town Hall in London. They honeymoon in Provence, Spain and Italy before returning.
- September 21 – Harley Granville-Barker's production of Shakespeare's The Winter's Tale opens at the Savoy Theatre, London, with simplified scenery, ensemble acting and naturalistic verse-speaking. It is replaced in November by his production of Twelfth Night.
- October
  - Edgar Rice Burroughs' character Tarzan (Viscount Greystoke, raised as a feral child by the fictional Mangani great apes) first appears in Tarzan of the Apes in the American pulp magazine The All-Story.
  - Sax Rohmer's character Fu Manchu (a "Yellow Peril" master criminal) first appears in "The Zayat Kiss" in the English pulp magazine Story-Teller, as the first installment of The Mystery of Dr. Fu-Manchu.
- October 12 – Arthur Schnitzler's play La Ronde (Reigen, 1900) is first performed (without the author's consent), in Budapest. It is also first translated into French this year.
- October 25 – The first issue of Simbolul is put out in Bucharest by Marcel Janco, Tristan Tzara and Ion Vinea.
- December? (or at latest January 1913) – A Slap in the Face of Public Taste (Пощёчина общественному вкусу), the seminal text of Russian Futurism, is published as a manifesto and a poetry almanac. Edited and written by David Burliuk, Viktor Khlebnikov, Aleksei Kruchenykh and Vladimir Mayakovsky, it attacks the tradition of Russian Symbolism, notably works by Leonid Andreyev, Konstantin Balmont, Alexander Blok and Ivan Bunin, and ridicules independents such as Maxim Gorky.
- unknown dates
  - The texts of 13 Sanskrit dramas, perhaps from the first centuries BCE and probably by Bhāsa (including the Svapnavasavadattam), are found by the scholar T. Ganapati Sastri in a palm-leaf codex in Kerala.
  - Publication of the Loeb Classical Library, parallel text editions of the classics begins at the London publisher Heinemann.

== New books ==
=== Fiction ===
- Mary Antin – The Promised Land
- Arnold Bennett – The Matador of the Five Towns
- E. F. Benson – Mrs. Ames
- Rhoda Broughton – Between Two Stools
- Mary Grant Bruce – Mates at Billabong
- Ivan Bunin – Dry Valley (Суходол, Sukhodo'l)
- Willa Cather – Alexander's Bridge
- J. Storer Clouston – The Mystery of Number 47
- Joseph Conrad – The Secret Sharer
- Grazia Deledda – Colombi e sparvieri (Pumpkins and Sparrows)
- Ethel M. Dell – The Way of an Eagle
- Sir Arthur Conan Doyle – The Lost World
- Theodore Dreiser – The Financier
- Lord Dunsany – The Book of Wonder (short stories)
- Edna Ferber – Buttered Side Down
- Anatole France – Les Dieux ont soif
- R. Austin Freeman
  - The Mystery of 31 New Inn
  - The Singing Bone
- Kahlil Gibran – The Broken Wings (Al-Ajniha al-Mutakassira)
- Elinor Glyn
  - Halcyone
  - Love Itself
  - The Reasons Why
- Sarah Grand – Adam's Orchard
- Zane Grey – Riders of the Purple Sage
- Knut Hamsun – The Last Joy (Den sidste Glæde)
- Gerhart Hauptmann – Atlantis
- Felix Hollaender – The Oath of Stephan Huller
- Annie Fellows Johnston – Mary Ware's Promised Land
- James Weldon Johnson – The Autobiography of an Ex-Colored Man
- Franz Kafka
  - Contemplation (Betrachtung, short story collection, dated 1913)
  - The Judgement (Das Urteil)
- Ada Leverson – Tenterhooks
- D. H. Lawrence – The Trespasser
- Stephen Leacock – Sunshine Sketches of a Little Town
- Sinclair Lewis (as Tom Graham) – Hike and the Aeroplane
- Julijonas Lindė-Dobilas – Blūdas; arba Lietuva buvusios Rusijos revoliucijos mete (Rampage)
- Marie Belloc Lowndes – The Chink in the Armour
- Oskar Luts – Kevade (Spring; part I)
- John MacCormick – Dùn Aluinn (in book form)
- Compton Mackenzie – Carnival
- Thomas Mann – Death in Venice (Der Tod in Venedig)
- Katherine Mansfield – "How Pearl Button Was Kidnapped" (short story)
- Richard Barham Middleton – The Ghost Ship and Other Stories
- E. Phillips Oppenheim
  - The Lighted Way
  - The Tempting of Tavernake
- Baroness Orczy
  - The Traitor
  - The Good Patriots
  - Fire in Stubble
  - Meadowsweet
- Henrik Pontoppidan – De dødes Rige (The Realm of the Dead; publication begins)
- Eleanor H. Porter – Miss Billy's Decision
- Forrest Reid – Following Darkness
- Willie Riley – Windyridge
- Saki – The Unbearable Bassington
- Henryk Sienkiewicz – In Desert and Wilderness (W pustyni i w puszczy)
- Hjalmar Söderberg – The Serious Game (Den allvarsamma leken)
- James Stephens – The Crock of Gold
- Sui Sin Far – Mrs. Spring Fragrance
- Leo Tolstoy (died 1910) – Hadji Murat (Хаджи-Мурат)
- Edgar Wallace – Private Selby
- Hugh Walpole – The Prelude to Adventure
- H. G. Wells – Marriage
- Percy F. Westerman
  - Captured at Tripoli
  - The Flying Submarine
  - The Quest of the Golden Hope
  - The Sea Monarch
- Edith Wharton – The Reef
- P. G. Wodehouse – The Prince and Betty
- Stefan Żeromski – The Faithful River (Wierna rzeka)

=== Children and young people ===
- L. Frank Baum
  - Sky Island
  - Phoebe Daring
  - Aunt Jane's Nieces on Vacation (as Edith Van Dyne)
  - The Flying Girl and Her Chum (as Edith Van Dyne)
- Waldemar Bonsels – Die Biene Maja und ihre Abenteuer (The Adventures of Maya the Bee)
- Edgar Rice Burroughs
  - Tarzan of the Apes
  - A Princess of Mars
- Howard R. Garis – Uncle Wiggily's Adventures
- Jack London
  - A Son of the Sun
  - The Scarlet Plague
- Lucy Maud Montgomery – Chronicles of Avonlea
- E. Nesbit – The Magic World
- Beatrix Potter – The Tale of Mr. Tod
- Gerdt von Bassewitz – Little Peter's Journey to the Moon (Peterchens Mondfahrt) (as drama)
- Jean Webster – Daddy-Long-Legs

=== Drama ===
- Arnold Bennett – Milestones
- Paul Claudel – L'Annonce faite à Marie (The Tidings Brought to Mary, first performed)
- George Diamandy – Rațiunea de stat (The Reason of State)
- Dietrich Eckart – adaptation of Henrik Ibsen's Peer Gynt
- Louis Esson – The Time Is Not Yet Ripe
- John Galsworthy – The Eldest Son
- Hugo von Hofmannsthal – Everyman, adapted as Jedermann
- Stanley Houghton – The Younger Generation
- Georg Kaiser – From Morning to Midnight (Von Morgens bis Mitternachts) (written)
- Heinrich Mann – Die grosse Liebe (The Great Love, published)
- J. Hartley Manners – Peg o' My Heart
- Louis N. Parker – Drake of England
- Arthur Schnitzler – Professor Bernhardi
- George Bernard Shaw – Pygmalion (published)
- G. K. Sowerby – Rutherford and Son
- Bayard Veiller – Within the Law
- I. C. Vissarion – Lupii (The Wolves, written)
- Frank Wedekind – Tod und Teufel (premieres in Berlin)

=== Poetry ===
- Anna Akhmatova – Vecher (Evening)
- Edwin James Brady
  - Bells and Hobbles
  - The King's Caravan
- Georgian Poetry 1911–12
- Pauline Johnson – Flint and Feather
- Amy Lowell – A Dome of Many-Coloured Glass
- Rabindranath Tagore (writer and translator) – Gitanjali (Song Offerings)

=== Non-fiction ===
- Hilaire Belloc – The Servile State
- Arnold Bennett – Those United States
- Alexander Berkman – Prison Memoirs of an Anarchist
- David Burliuk, Viktor Khlebnikov, Aleksei Kruchenykh, Vladimir Mayakovsky – A Slap in the Face of Public Taste (Пощёчина общественному вкусу)
- Aleister Crowley – Magick (Book 4)
- Albert Gleizes and Jean Metzinger – Du "Cubisme"
- Henry H. Goddard – The Kallikak Family
- Carl Jung – Psychology of the Unconscious (Wandlungen und Symbole der Libido)
- Frigyes Karinthy – Így írtok ti (That's How You Write, literary parodies)
- Pierre Loti – Un Pèlerin d'Angkor (A Pilgrimage to Angkor)
- Donald Lowrie – My Life in Prison
- Dumitru C. Moruzi – Pribegi în țară răpită
- John Muir – The Yosemite
- P. D. Ouspensky – Tertium Organum
- Bertrand Russell – The Problems of Philosophy
- Ernst Troeltsch – Die Soziallehren der christlichen Kirchen und Gruppen (The Sociology of the Christian Churches and Groups)

== Births ==
- January 7 – Charles Addams, American cartoonist (died 1988)
- January 15 – Celia Dale, English fiction writer and book reviewer (died 2011)
- January 28 – Alison Adburgham (born Margaret Vere Alison Haig), English social historian and journalist (died 1997)
- January 30 – Barbara Tuchman, American historian (died 1989)
- February 10 – Ena Lamont Stewart, Scottish playwright (died 2006)
- February 11 – Roy Fuller, English poet and novelist (died 1991)
- February 12 – R. F. Delderfield, English novelist and playwright (died 1972)
- February 15 – George Mikes, Hungarian-born English humorist (died 1987)
- February 17 – Andre Norton, American sci-fi and fantasy author (died 2005)
- February 20 – Pierre Boulle, French novelist (died 1994)
- February 27 – Lawrence Durrell, English poet and novelist (died 1990)
- March 7 – Dora Oake Russell, Newfoundland writer, diarist and journalist (died 1986)
- March 12 – Kylie Tennant, Australian novelist, dramatist and historian (died 1988)
- April 16 – Garth Williams, American children's writer and illustrator (died 1996)
- April 24 – Marta Rădulescu, Romanian novelist and poet (died 1959)
- May 3 – May Sarton, American writer (died 1995)
- May 16 – Studs Terkel, American writer and broadcaster (died 2008)
- May 20 – J. L. Carr, English novelist and publisher (died 1994)
- May 27 – John Cheever, American writer (died 1982)
- May 29 – Pamela Hansford Johnson, English poet, novelist and critic (died 1981)
- June 20 – Anthony Buckeridge, English children's author (died 2004)
- June 24 – Mary Wesley, English novelist (died 2002)
- June 27 – E. R. Braithwaite, Guyanese-born novelist, teacher and diplomat (died 2016)
- June 29 – John Toland, American Pulitzer Prize winning historian and biographer (died 2004)
- July 3 – Elizabeth Taylor, English novelist (died 1975)
- July 6 – Heinrich Harrer, Austrian explorer and author (died 2006)
- July 14 – Northrop Frye, Canadian critic (died 1991)
- July 17 – Michael Gilbert, English mystery and thriller novelist (died 2006)
- August 4 – Virgilio Piñera, Cuban poet and short-story writer (died 1979)
- August 10 – Jorge Amado, Brazilian writer (died 2001)
- August 14 – Erwin Strittmatter, German writer (died 1994)
- August 18 – Elsa Morante, Italian author (died 1985)
- August 23 – Nelson Rodrigues, Brazilian author (died 1980)
- c. September 5 – Sesto Pals, Romanian Israeli poet and philosopher (died 2002)
- September 12 – J. F. Hendry, Scottish-born poet (died 1986)
- September 24 – Ian Serraillier, English novelist and poet (died 1994)
- October 31 – Oscar Dystel, American paperback publisher (died 2014)
- November 8 – Monica Edwards, English children's author (died 1998)
- November 12 – Donagh MacDonagh, Irish poet, playwright and judge (died 1968)
- November 24 – Garson Kanin, American dramatist and screenwriter (died 1999)
- November 25 – Francis Durbridge, English dramatist (died 1998)
- November 26 – Eugène Ionesco, Romanian Absurdist playwright (died 1994)
- December 4 – Ian Wallace, English science fiction writer (died 1998)

== Deaths ==
- January 7 – Sophia Jex-Blake, English medical writer and pioneer female physician (born 1840)
- January 24 – James Allen, English self-help writer and poet (born 1864)
- January 27 – Alexandre Bisson, French playwright, vaudeville creator and novelist (born 1848)
- January 28 – Gustave de Molinari, Belgian economist (born 1819)
- February 1 – Florence Huntley, American journalist, editor, humorist and occult author (born 1855)
- February 2 – Annie Somers Gilchrist, American author (born 1841)
- February 7 – Edward Wilmot Blyden, Liberian pan-Africanist and President of Liberia College (born 1832)
- February 8 – Girish Chandra Ghosh, Bengali poet, playwright and novelist (born 1844)
- March 1 – George Grossmith, English comic singer and writer (born 1847)
- March 30 – Karl May, German novelist (born 1842)
- April 6 – Giovanni Pascoli, Italian poet (born 1855)
- April 10 – Gabriel Monod, French historian (born 1844)
- April 15 – In the wreck of RMS Titanic
  - Jacques Futrelle, American author (born 1875)
  - William Thomas Stead, English journalist (born 1849)
- April 20 – Bram Stoker, Irish novelist and theatre manager (born 1847)
- May 5 – Rafael Pombo, Colombian mathematician and poet (born 1833)
- May 6 – Lie Kim Hok, Chinese writer, teacher and translator (born 1853)
- May 14 – August Strindberg, Swedish dramatist (born 1849)
- May 19 – Bolesław Prus, Polish novelist (born 1847)
- June 4 – Eliza Archard Conner, American writer (born 1838)
- June 13 – Alice Diehl, English novelist and concert pianist (born 1844)
- July 20 – Andrew Lang, Scottish poet, novelist and critic (born 1844)
- July 24 – Addison Peale Russell, American essayist (born 1826)
- July 25 – Anthony E. Wills, American playwright, novelist and theatrical producer (born 1879)
- August 13 – Horace Howard Furness, American Shakespeare scholar (born 1833)
- August 29 – Theodor Gomperz, Austrian philosopher (born 1832)
- September 5 – Bertha Jane Grundy, English novelist (born 1837)
- September 9 – Berta Behrens, German novelist (born 1850)
- October 21 – Robert Barr, Scottish Canadian short story writer and novelist (born 1849)
- November 30 – Dharmavaram Ramakrishnamacharyulu, Telugu dramatist (born 1853)
- December 9 – Louis de Gramont, French journalist, dramatist and librettist (born 1855)
- December 19 – Mir Mosharraf Hossain, Bengali novelist, playwright and essayist (born 1847)
- December 20 – Lucy Morris Chaffee Alden, American author, educator and hymnwriter (born 1836)

== Awards ==
- Newdigate Prize: William Chase Greene, "Richard I Before Jerusalem"
- Nobel Prize for Literature: Gerhart Hauptmann
- Prix Goncourt: André Savignon, "Les filles de la pluie"
