= Richard Rhodes Bristow =

English clergyman

- Canon
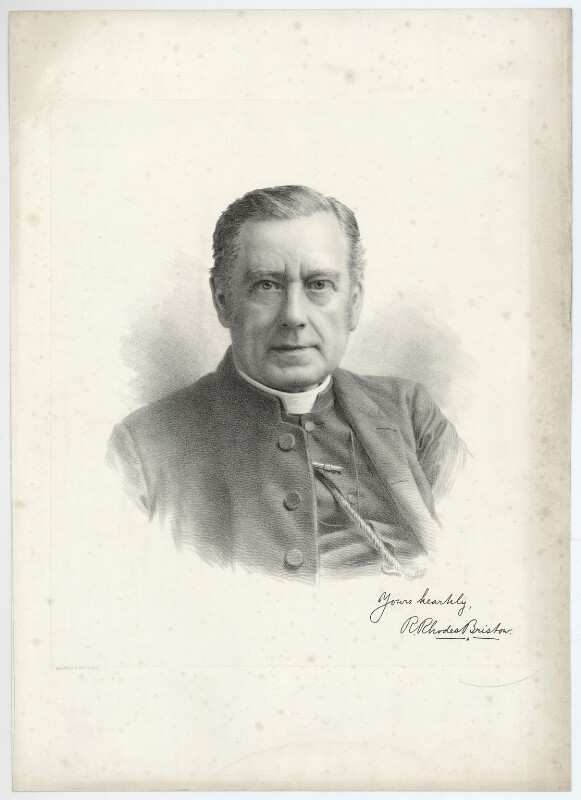
- Richard Rhodes Bristow, Lithograph, National Portrait Gallery
- Church: 1866 St Philip's Church, Clerkenwell; 1868 St Stephen's, Lewisham; 1897 St Olave's Church, Southwark
- Other post: Hon. Canon Rochester Cathedral

Orders
- Ordination: 1866 (deacon) by Bishop Of Rupert's Land

Personal details
- Born: June 1838 Greenwich
- Died: 15 March 1914 (aged 75–76) Lewisham
- Buried: Lewisham
- Children: 4
- Education: St Mary Hall, Oxford

Canon Richard Rhodes Bristow MA (June 1838 – 15 March 1914) was an English clergyman in the late 19th and early 20th centuries, and was involved with various church and charitable organisations.

Born in Greenwich, England, the son of a wool importer, Bristow was a deacon of St Philip's Church, Clerkenwell, and vicar of St Stephen's, Lewisham, and was Canon missioner of Southwark Cathedral, and Hon. Canon of Rochester Cathedral. Bristow spent his 48-year working life in London, and, upon his death, was described as "one of the most active and best-known clergymen in the metropolis".

== Background ==
He was the fourth and youngest son of Henry Essex Bristow, a wool importer of Bread Street, London. He was born in Greenwich in June 1838, and was educated privately. He gained his BA from St Mary Hall, Oxford 1866, and his MA in 1868. He was ordained deacon in 1866, and priest in 1867 by the Bishop of Rochester.

== Incumbencies ==
He was a deacon of St Philip's Church, Clerkenwell before transferring to become vicar of St Stephen's, Lewisham in 1868, where he remained for 29 years.

== Canon ==
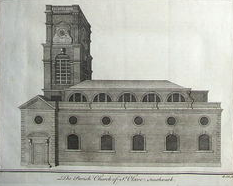
St Olaves Southwark, where Bristow was curate

He was rector of Southwark Cathedral from 1897, and proctor in convocation at Rochester from 1892.

In 1896, Bristow also caused controversy at a Southwark Ruridecanal Conference with his statement that a "licensed victualler is an important member of the community, and a good public house is advantage to a parish". In 1906, a protest was made by the trustees of the church against paying the canon's stipend of £600 a year on grounds of 'insufficient attention to the work of the parish'. The Bishop of Southwark wrote in reply that Bristow had 'requested him to throw most of his energy into the work of the cathedral and diocese' and admitted that the rectorship of St Olave's was 'practically a sinecure'.

== Other roles and duties ==
Bristow was prolific in his duties, serving as honorary chaplain to the 3rd Middlesex Artillery Volunteers in 1872, member of the London School Board for 12 years, including serving as chairman of the school management committee, Almoner of Christ's Hospital, Chairman of Lewisham Union Board of Guardians, Commissary for Bishop of New Westminster (1895), Honorary Chaplain to Nursing Sisters of the Community of St. John the Divine, Warden of All Saint's Boys' Orphanage, Lewisham, Chairman of Poor Clergy Relief Corporation, Warden of the Kent County Penitentiary, President of the Gregorian Choral Association, Representative of London County Council on the governing body of the East London Industrial School, Governor of St. Dunstan's College, Catford and Commissioner of Land and Income Tax for the Blackheath Division.

Following his death, two windows were dedicated to the memory of Canon Bristow in the chapel of St Catherine's School For Girls.

== Personal life ==
Bristow married Elizabeth Lane, and fathered four children, a son who went into the Diplomatic service and three daughters.
