= The Grim Smile of the Five Towns =

1907 short story collection by Arnold Bennett

- Title page for The Grim Smile of the Five Towns (1907)
- Author: Arnold Bennett
- Language: English
- Genre: Short stories
- Publisher: Chapman and Hall, Ltd.
- Publication date: 1907
- Publication place: United Kingdom
- Media type: Print (hardcover)
- Pages: 302pp

The Grim Smile of the Five Towns is the second major collection of stories written by Arnold Bennett. The book first appeared in print in June 1907. Only around half of the stories had previously appeared in print. The five towns of the title are the conurbation of Stoke-on-Trent in which much of the writer's best work is set.

== Stories ==
- "The Lion's Share".
- "Baby's Bath".
- "The Silent Brothers".
- "The Nineteenth Hat".
- "Vera's First Christmas Adventure".
- "The Murder of the Mandarin".
- "Vera's Second Christmas Adventure".
- "The Burglary".
- "News of the Engagement".
- "Beginning of the New Year".
- "From One Generation to Another".
- "The Death of Simon Fuge".
- "In a New Bottle".

== Reception ==
Bennett anticipated that the collection would help to establish his stature as a writer, showing that he could rise above what he termed his "potboilers". But the book had some initial sharp criticism from press reviewers. Some critics focused especially on the macabre story "In a New Bottle", with the Staffordshire Sentinel calling it "nasty" and The Bookman terming it "grotesque". There was also a rebuke for the mild sexual ribaldry of the long story "The Death of Simon Fuge", when in a 1907 Spectator a reviewer remarked that "Simon Fuge"... "very much oversteps the boundaries of good taste". "Simon Fuge", not having been written for what Bennett called the "unperceptive stupidity" of the magazine audiences, was able to be bold with its themes and approach. There was more praise across the Atlantic, when a long New York Times review found Bennett to be of "prodigious importance", with "Simon Fuge" his best story and his stories "very much superior to the best of his novels".

Later critics have been kinder to the collection's key story, with Margaret Drabble calling "Simon Fuge"... "one of the greatest short stories in the English language", and John Wain remarking that... "it says as much as a novel, it says easily as much as a novel of a hundred thousand words could say on this theme" and naming it... "the best thing that Arnold Bennett ever did."

Despite few reviews and lacklustre sales of The Grim Smile of the Five Towns, the deft work of Bennett's literary agent meant that the book's new stories proved to be very profitable.

== The Five Towns ==
The industrial district, now city, of Stoke-on-Trent consists of six towns which joined in 1910. The conurbation has become known as "The Five Towns" because of the name given to it by local novelist Arnold Bennett. In his novels, Bennett used mostly recognisable aliases for five of the six towns (although he called Stoke "Knype"). However, Bennett said that he believed "Five Towns" was more euphonious than "Six Towns", so he omitted the lesser town of Fenton.
