= Jonathan Taylor (author) =

British author, poet and lecturer (born 1973)

Jonathan P Taylor (born 1973) is a British author, poet and lecturer.

== Life ==
Taylor was born in 1973 in Stoke-on-Trent and educated at Trentham High School and Warwick University where he studied English Literature, later gaining a PhD from Loughborough University. He is currently a lecturer in Creative Writing at the University of Leicester and co-director of arts organisation Crystal Clear Creators. Notably for an author and academic, he did not learn to read and write until the age of eight. He lives in Leicestershire with his wife, poet Maria Taylor, and their twin daughters. His 2024 collection Scablands and Other Stories was the winner of the 2025 Arnold Bennett book prize.

== Works ==
Academic

- Mastery and Slavery in Victorian Writing. Palgrave Macmillan. 2002. ISBN 978-0-33399-312-5.
- Figures of Heresy: Radical Theology in English and American Writing, 1800–2000. Sussex Academic Press. 2005. ISBN 978-1-84519-026-2.
- Science and Omniscience in Nineteenth-Century Literature. Sussex Academic Press. 2007. ISBN 978-1-84519-125-2.

Memoirs, Novels and Short Stories

- Take Me Home: Parkinson's, My Father, Myself. Granta Books. 2007. ISBN 978-1-86207-955-7.
- Entertaining Strangers. Salt. 2012. ISBN 978-1-90777-327-3.
- Overheard: Stories to Read Aloud (Ed.). Salt. 2012. ISBN 978-1-90777-326-6.
- Scablands and Other Sories. Salt. 2024. ISBN 9781784632946

Poetry

- Musicolepsy. Shoestring Press. 2012. ISBN 978-1-907356-72-8.
- Cassandra Complex. Shoestring Press. 2018. ISBN 978-1-912524-17-4.
