= John Lancaster (writer) =

British poet and writer (born 1946)

John Lancaster (born 18 April 1946) is a British poet and writer. He has published six collections of poetry: Effects of War (1986); Split Shift (with Geoff Hattersley) (1990); The Barman (1993), Here In Scotland (with Milan Knizak) (2000) and Potters: A Division of Labour (2017) which won the inaugural Arnold Bennett Book Prize. His latest collection is Where The Trent Rises (2023) from Clayhanger Press.

== Early life and career ==
John Lancaster was born and grew up in the village of Biddulph Moor, Staffordshire and educated at Hanley High School, Stoke-on-Trent and Sheffield University. He qualified as a town and regional planner in 1970 and then worked in local government and the housing association movement. While working in Birmingham he was trombonist with Dan Pawson's Artesian Hall Stompers (1973–1979) and during this period spent time living and playing jazz in New Orleans, USA: it was in these years that he began to write.

== Writing career ==
Lancaster first came to prominence as a second prizewinner in the National Poetry Competition, 1979. In 1980 he moved to Huddersfield, West Yorkshire where for thirteen years he became part of a flourishing local poetry scene, largely centred around the critically constructive workshops of The Poetry Business and The Albert Poets in which many fine writers participated including Simon Armitage, David Morley, Peter Sansom, Janet Fisher, Milner Place, John Duffy, John Bosley and Stephanie Bowgett. It was his time in Huddersfield that saw the publication of his first three collections. In 1993 he moved to rural Aberdeenshire where he lived for eight years, this being the inspiration for his fourth collection Here In Scotland (with Czech artist and writer Milan Knizak).

He was Writer-in-Residence at Huddersfield University (1986–87) and subsequently has held numerous positions as a creative writing tutor including: WEA, Huddersfield (1987–89); Poet In Schools, Kirklees (1989); Arvon Foundation at Lumb Bank (1989); University of Huddersfield (1989–93); Open College of the Arts (1989–2001); Gray's School of Art, The Robert Gordon University (1993–96).

His work is used on educational syllabuses and has appeared in many poetry and literary journals including Poetry Review, Times Literary Supplement, London Magazine, Ambit, The Rialto, Iron, The North. He has performed his work at many venues and literature festivals in the UK, most recently at the Stoke Literary Festival 2017, and Europe and in the broadcast media including BBC2, BBC Radio4, Radio Prague and YTV's ‘Readabout’ series.

== Personal life ==
Lancaster is married to the artist Barbara Milligan, with whom he has two sons. He continues to work in housing as a consultant and has written on the subject. Since 2015 he has lived in Totnes, Devon. He still plays the bass trombone.

== Work ==
Poetry Collections

- Where The Trent Rises (2023), Clayhanger Press
- Effects of War (1986), Giant Steps Press
- Split Shift (with Geoff Hattersley) (1990), Smith/Doorstop Books
- The Barman (1993), Smith/Doorstop Books
- Here In Scotland (with Milan Knizak) (2000), Vetus Via
- Potters; A Division of Labour (2017), Longmarsh Press

Poetry in Anthologies (selected)

- National Poetry Competition 1979 Prizewinners (1979), The Poetry Society/BBC2
- Contemporary Yorkshire Poetry (ed. V. Scannell) (1984), Yorkshire Arts Association
- Yesterday's Yorkshire (1991), David and Charles
- The Experience of Poetry (ed G.Mort) (1991), Open College of the Arts
- The Art of Bicycling: A Treasury of Poems (2005), Breakaway Books (US)
- AQA English Literature: Poetry and Anthology (2010), Nelson Thornes
- GCSE Poetry Skills (2011), Nelson Thornes

Prizes, Awards, Appointments (selected)

- Clann Eirann Poetry Competition (from Dominic Behan) First Prize (1978)
- National Poetry Competition, The Poetry Society/ BBC2, Second Prize (1979)
- Yorkshire Arts Bursary Award (1983)
- Klick Magazine, Editor (1991)
- Open College of the Arts, Writing Steering Group (1991–93)
- National Association of Writers In Education, Chair (1992–93)
- Leopard/BP Poetry Competition, Second Prize (1995)
- Royal Literary Fund Bursary (2000)
- British Council Travel Grant (2000)
- Southern Arts Travel Grant (2001)
- Elgin Writers Poetry Competition, Judge (2002)
- McLellan Poetry Competition, Commended Award (2016)
- Fire River Poets Competition, Third Prize and Commended Award (2017)
- The Arnold Bennett Book Prize, inaugural Winner (2017)
