= Helen with the High Hand =

Helen with the High Hand is a short, comedic novel by Arnold Bennett, published in 1910. It was originally published in serial form as The Miser's Niece.

== Plot summary ==
The story concerns the chance meeting between an elderly, witty, but miserly man and his estranged young niece. Both characters are strong and stubborn, but discover an affection and affinity for each other. The niece moves into the miser's house, and what follows is a battle of wills enjoyed by both parties. Indeed, on occasion, both characters scheme to achieve the same outcome (such as ensuring that the niece will miss a boat to Canada that would remove her from her uncle's life).

Under his niece's influence, the uncle reluctantly abandons some of his financial prejudices. The book also chronicles their two romances, and, by the end, both are married to suitable partners.
