= How to Live on 24 Hours a Day =

1908 self-help book by Arnold Bennett

How to Live on Twenty-four Hours a Day
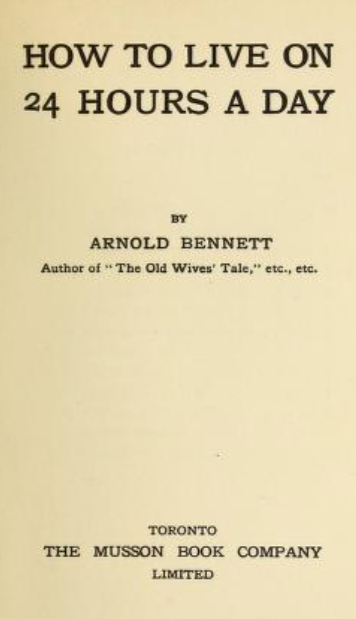
- Title page for How to Live on 24 Hours a Day (1910 edition)
- Author: Arnold Bennett
- Language: English
- Subject: Self-help
- Genre: Nonfiction
- Publication date: 1908
- Publication place: United Kingdom
- Media type: Print

How to Live on Twenty-four Hours a Day is a short self-help book "about the daily organization of time" by novelist Arnold Bennett. Written originally as a series of articles in the London Evening News in 1907, it was published in book form in 1908. Aimed initially at "the legions of clerks and typists and other meanly paid workers caught up in the explosion of British office jobs around the turn of the [twentieth] century", it was one of several "pocket philosophies" by Bennett that "offered a strong message of hope from somebody who so well understood their lives". The book was especially successful in the US, where Henry Ford bought 500 copies to give to his friends and employees. Bennett himself said that the book "has brought me more letters of appreciation than all my other books put together".

In her book The Self-Help Compulsion: Searching for Advice in Modern Literature, Harvard academic Beth Blum argued that "Bennett's essays on the art of living mount a challenge against modernism's disdain for the crude utilitarianism of public taste" and saw Virginia Woolf's hostility to Bennett as "defined, in part, as an inspired rebuttal of Bennett's practical philosophies". In a 2019 New York Times article, Cal Newport recommended How to Live on Twenty-four Hours a Day as an inspiration for anyone embarking on a program of "digital decluttering".

== Philosophy ==
In the book, Bennett addressed the growing number of white-collar workers that had accumulated since the advent of the Industrial Revolution. In his view, these workers put in eight hours a day, forty hours a week, at jobs they did not enjoy, and at worst, hated. They worked to make a living, but their daily existence consisted of waking up, getting ready for work, working as little as possible during the workday, going home, unwinding, going to sleep, and repeating the process the next day. In short, he did not believe they were really living.

Bennett addressed this problem by urging his readers to seize their extra time and make the most of it to improve themselves. Extra time could be found at the beginning of the day, by waking up early, and on the ride to work, on the way home from work, in the evening, and especially during the weekends. During this time, he prescribed improvement measures such as reading great literature, taking an interest in the arts, reflecting on life, and learning self-discipline.

Bennett wrote that time is the most precious of commodities and that many books have been written on how to live on a certain amount of money each day. He added that the old adage "time is money" understates the matter, as time can often produce money, but money cannot produce more time. Time is extremely limited, and Bennett urged others to make the best of the time remaining in their lives.

== Advice ==
In the book, Bennett offers the following advice:

- View the 24-hour day as two separate days, one encompassing the 8-hour workday and the other a 16-hour personal day to be accounted for and utilized.
- Train your mind daily to focus on a single thing continuously for an extended period, 50 minutes in his "average case" example.
- Reflect on yourself.
- Claim 90 minutes each evening for three evenings a week, to start with. More time can be found, but Bennett recommends starting small instead of attempting a large enterprise and failing.
- Those 90 minutes can be claimed in the evening, in the morning, on the train to and from work, or other time that is not put to good use. He recommends evenings for most people, but it depends on one's schedule.
- Use that 90 minutes to improve yourself. Over the course of weeks and months, the knowledge gained in those chunks of time will add up to a significant amount.
- Literature is not the only means of self-improvement. Other reading can be very beneficial, including learning more about your business, learning about the "causes and effects" of things, and learning about history and philosophy.
- He does not recommend reading novels for self-improvement. He highly recommends poetry, especially verse novels, such as Milton's Paradise Lost.

== Warnings ==
Bennett also warns against:

- Becoming a prig and insisting others follow the same improvement programme—he says that it is enough to worry about your own improvement.
- Becoming a slave to your programme. You should be flexible enough to allow other things in your life. At the same time, it must be rigid enough to actually be called a programme. Finding that balance between rigidity and flexibility is not easy, Bennett says.
- Being rushed and constantly worrying about what one has to do next, which he said is like living in a prison. He says, "The evil springs not from persisting without elasticity in what one has attempted, but from originally attempting too much, from filling one's programme till it runs over. The only cure is to reconstitute the programme, and to attempt less."
- Failing at the beginning of the enterprise, which "may easily kill outright the newborn impulse towards a complete vitality, and therefore every precaution should be observed to avoid it. The impulse must not be over-taxed. Let the pace of the first lap be even absurdly slow, but let it be as regular as possible."

== Chapters ==
The book includes the following chapters:

- The Daily Miracle
- The Desire to Exceed One's Programme
- Precautions Before Beginning
- The Cause of the Trouble
- Tennis and the Immortal Soul
- Remember Human Nature
- Controlling the Mind
- The Reflective Mood
- Interest in the Arts
- Nothing in Life is Humdrum
- Serious Reading
- Dangers to Avoid

== Quote ==
Which of us lives on twenty-four hours a day? And when I say "lives," I do not mean exists, nor "muddles through." Which of us is free from that uneasy feeling that the "great spending departments" of his daily life are not managed as they ought to be? [...] Which of us has not been saying to himself all his life: "I shall alter that when I have a little more time"? We never shall have any more time. We have, and we have always had, all the time there is.
