= Mr. Bennett and Mrs. Brown =

1924 essay by Virginia Woolf

- First edition cover 1924
- Author: Virginia Woolf
- Cover artist: Vanessa Bell
- Language: English
- Publisher: Hogarth Press
- Publication date: 1924
- Publication place: United Kingdom
- Pages: 24 pp.

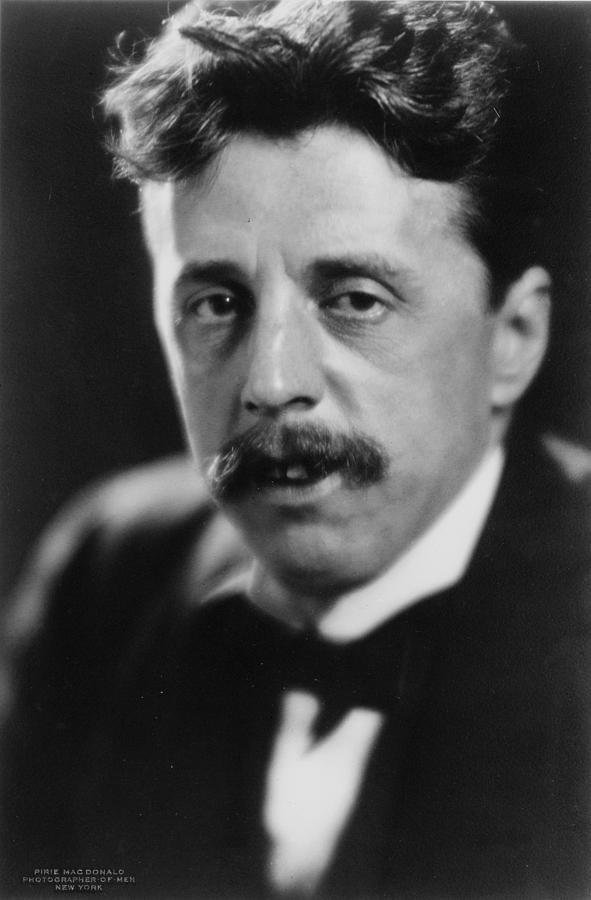
Arnold Bennett in 1922

Mr. Bennett and Mrs. Brown is an essay by Virginia Woolf published in 1924 which explores modernity. It includes the famous observation by Woolf that "on or about December 1910 human character changed."

== History ==
The writer Arnold Bennett had written a review of Woolf's Jacob's Room (1922) in Cassell's Weekly in March 1923, which provoked Woolf to rebut it. She recorded in her diary in June that Bennett accused her of writing about characters that couldn't survive. Her response was published in the United States in Nation and Athenaeum in December as Mr. Bennett and Mrs. Brown. The response encouraged her to develop her ideas of cultural relativism further. The following year she presented these ideas as a paper read to the Heretics Society at Cambridge University on 18 May 1924. T.S. Eliot, then editor of The Criterion, asked her for an article, and she submitted her talk, which was published in July under the title Character in Fiction and then by the Hogarth Press on 30 October 1924 under its original title as No. 1 of the Hogarth Essays (1924–1926). The cover was illustrated by Vanessa Bell.

== Premise ==
Woolf addresses what she sees as the arrival of modernism, with the much-cited phrase "on or about December, 1910, human character changed", referring to Roger Fry's exhibition Manet and the Post-Impressionists. She argued that this in turn led to a change in human relations, and thence to change in "religion, conduct, politics, and literature". She envisaged modernism as inherently unstable, a society and culture in flux. She develops her argument through the examination of two generations of writers. Bennett was a critic of not just Woolf, but modern writers in general. In particular, he challenged modern writers' depiction of "reality".

Woolf throws out a challenge to Bennett:

"Mr. Bennett says that it is only if the characters are real that the novel has any chance of surviving. Otherwise, die it must. But, I ask myself, what is reality? And who are the judges of reality?"

Her argument is that as times change, writers and the tools that they use must evolve, "the tools of one generation are useless to the next". She places Bennett in the Edwardians, and the subjects of his attacks as "Georgians" to reflect the change of monarch in 1910 that coincided with Fry's exhibition. She characterises Georgian writers in modernist terms as impressionistic, and those that are "telling the truth".

Her vision of reality is captured in the world of an anonymous woman she has observed, to whom she gives the name "Mrs. Brown", whose world is to be reflected by modernist writers.

== Cover ==
Bell's modernist cover design shown here was used for the entire essay series, depicting a woman reading, with hair and clothing reflecting 1920s style.

== Reception ==
The essay has become a key element in the analysis of Woolf's work but also twentieth century literature in general. It eventually contributed to a decline in Bennett's reputation. However critics such as John Carey have defended Bennett against Woolf's alleged snobbery, while the novelist Philip Hensher recently described Mr Bennett and Mrs Brown as a "toxic but naïve essay about [Bennett’s] ingenious and well-made work" which "continues to mislead readers".

== Bibliography ==
- Majumdar, Robin; McLaurin, Allen (2003) [1975]. Virginia Woolf: The critical heritage. Routledge. ISBN 978-1-134-72404-8.
- Woolf, Virginia (2017) [1924 Hogarth Press]. Mr. Bennett and Mrs. Brown. Virginia Woolf. ISBN 978-88-260-3291-7. Complete text
- British Library (2018). "'Mr. Bennett and Mrs. Brown' by Virginia Woolf". 20th century collection.
- Hovanec, Cari. "Cambridge Heretics Society". Literature and Science in Modern Britain.
- Woolf, Virginia (1924). "Character in Fiction". Sally Greene, University of Virginia.
