= Ian Wallace (author) =

American novelist

Ian Wallace is the pen name of American science-fiction author John Wallace Pritchard (December 4, 1912 – July 7, 1998).

== Biography ==
Dr. John Wallace Pritchard was born in Chicago, Illinois in 1912 and spent his professional life in Detroit, Michigan, later retiring to North Carolina and Las Vegas, Nevada, where he died in 1998. Wallace attended primary and secondary school in Detroit and received a Bachelor's of Arts degree in English from the University of Michigan in 1934 and began his career with the Detroit Public Schools administration. In 1936 he received his Teacher's Certificate in special education from Wayne State University.

During the second World War, Pritchard served as a captain in the United States Army, applying his training as a clinical psychologist. He returned to Detroit Public Schools and a part-time faculty position at Wayne State after the war, beginning also his PhD studies.

== Writing ==
In the late 1940s, Pritchard began publishing short stories ultimately culminating in his psychological novel Every Crazy Wind in 1952. His 1957 doctoral dissertation, A Novel as Pro-Inquiry: A Critique of Some Adult Value-Conflicts Conditioned by Education included an abridged novel, Pan's Last April. His most prolific period of publication started with the 1967 space opera Croyd and lasted through the early 1980s. His last novel, Megalomania, was published in 1989.

== Bibliography ==
Adventures of Minds-in-Bodies
Attributed to John Wallace Pritchard:
Every Crazy Wind	(1952)		LCCN 52-7346
Pan's Last April (Abridged)	(1957)		
Attributed to Ian Wallace:
Pan Sagittarius	(1973)	ISBN 0-399-11105-0	LCCN 72-94258
The World Asunder	(1976)	ISBN 0-87997-262-9	
The Lucifer Comet	(1980)	ISBN 0-87997-581-4	LCCN 2006-594203

The Croyd Spacetime Manoeuvres
Croyd	(1967)	ISBN 0-8125-5625-9	LCCN 67-23599
Dr. Orpheus	(1968)	ISBN 0-425-01767-2	LCCN 68-25464
A Voyage to Dari	(1974)	ISBN 0-87997-142-8	
Z-Sting	(1978)	ISBN 0-87997-408-7	
Megalomania	(1989)	ISBN 0-88677-351-2	LCCN 2002-559217

The Claudine St. Cyr Interplanetary Detective Mysteries
Deathstar Voyage	(1969)	ISBN 0-425-01924-1	LCCN 69-18198
The Purloined Prince	(1971)	ISBN 0-8415-0134-3	LCCN 72-154251
The Sign of the Mute Medusa	(1977)	ISBN 0-445-03173-5	
Heller's Leap	(1980)	ISBN 0-87997-475-3	

Others
The Rape of the Sun	(1982)	ISBN 0-87997-704-3
