= Frank Swinnerton =

English novelist and editor (1884–1982)

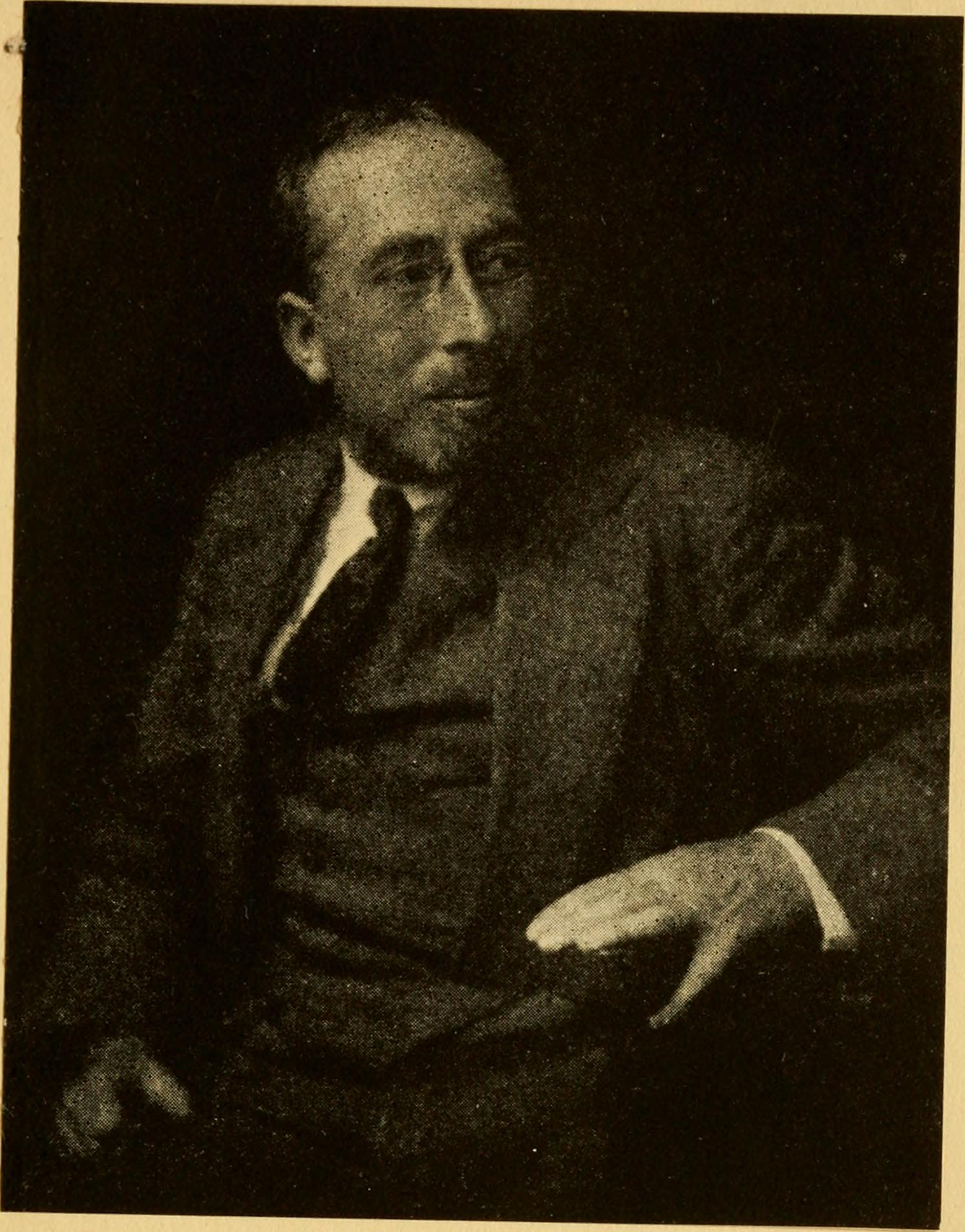
Frank Swinnerton

Frank Arthur Swinnerton (12 August 1884 – 6 November 1982) was an English novelist, critic, biographer and essayist.

He was the author of more than 50 books, and as a publisher's editor helped other writers including Aldous Huxley and Lytton Strachey. His long life and career in publishing made him one of the last links with the generation of writers that included H. G. Wells, John Galsworthy and Arnold Bennett.

== Biography ==
Swinnerton was born in Wood Green, a suburb of London, the son of Charles Swinnerton, a copperplate engraver, and Rose, née Cottam.

=== Career ===
Swinnerton left school at the age of 14 and was employed as an office boy for a newspaper publisher, Hay, Nisbet & Co and then as a clerk-receptionist by J. M. Dent, publishers of Everyman's Library. He moved on to the publishing house of Chatto & Windus, first as a proof-reader and then as an editor. Although he began writing novels in 1909, he continued editing until he became a full-time author in 1926. Even then, he also worked as literary critic for the magazine Truth, the London Evening News (1929–32) and chief novel reviewer to The Observer (1937–43) and then the writer of a weekly 'Letter to Gog and Magog' in the popular literary paper called the John O'London's Weekly, 1943 to 1954.

As a novelist, Swinnerton achieved critical and commercial success with Nocturne in 1917, and remained a successful writer for the rest of his life. His last novel, Some Achieve Greatness (1976), was published when he was in his early nineties. Some critics detected echoes of George Gissing and Arnold Bennett in Swinnerton's work, but he himself thought his chief influences were Henry James, Henrik Ibsen and Louisa May Alcott.

His prose style was "natural and lucid", and he disapproved of over-intellectual or pretentious writing. In The Georgian Literary Scene, an evocation of the era of the gentlemanly man of letters in its final years, he wrote, "If I dwell for a moment longer, as I fear I must, upon the weakness of too much scholarship in the arts, it is because I think scholarship is nowadays excessively valued as a necessary preliminary to creative writing." Of all of his critical contributions, The Georgian Literary Scene stands out, and it is still used by those who study the period. The New York Times declared it "wholly – and most refreshingly – unlike other literary histories." Swinnerton himself said of his work: "My best books, in my own opinion, are Harvest Comedy and The Georgian Literary Scene, but I do not regard either one as of lasting importance.... I live in the country, am very lazy, work unwillingly very hard, and have few intolerances."

=== Personal life ===
Swinnerton lived for more than fifty years in Old Tokefield, Cranleigh, Surrey, a rural spot not far from London. He was twice married; his first marriage, in 1917, to the poet Helen Dircks, ended in divorce. In 1924 he married Mary Dorothy Bennett, with whom he had one daughter. Swinnerton died at Old Tokefield at the age of 98. His obituary notice in The Times began by noting that his death "breaks one of the last links with his great contemporaries, Wells, Galsworthy and Arnold Bennett."

== Bibliography ==
- The Merry Heart, 1909.
- The Young Idea, 1910.
- The Casement, 1911.
- The Happy Family, 1912.
- George Gissing: a Critical Study, 1912.
- On the Staircase, 1914.
- R. L. Stevenson: a Critical Study, 1914.
- The Chaste Wife, 1916.
- Nocturne, 1917.
- Shops and Houses, 1918.
- September, 1919.
- Coquette, 1921.
- The Three Lovers, 1922.
- Young Felix, 1923.
- The Elder Sister, 1925.
- Summer Storm, 1926.
- Tokefield Papers, 1927.
- A London Bookman, 1928.
- A Brood of Ducklings, 1928.
- Sketch of a Sinner, 1929.
- Authors and the Book Trade, 1932.
- The Georgian House, 1932.
- Elizabeth, 1934.
- The Georgian Literary Scene, 1935; revised ed. 1950
- Swinnerton: An Autobiography, 1937.
- Harvest Comedy, 1937.
- The Two Wives, 1939.
- The Reviewing and Criticism of Books, 1939.
- The Fortunate Lady, 1941,
- Thankless Child, 1942.
- A Woman in Sunshine, 1944.
- English Maiden, 1946.
- The Cats and Rosemary, (US) 1948.
- Faithful Company, 1948.
- The Doctor’s Wife Comes to Stay, 1949.
- Arnold Bennett, 1950.
- A Flower for Catherine, 1950.
- The Bookman’s London, 1951; 2nd ed. 1969
- Master Jim Probity, 1952.
- Londoner’s Post, 1952.
- A Month in Gordon Square, 1953.
- The Sumner Intrigue, 1955.
- The Adventures of a Manuscript, 1956.
- Authors I Never Met, 1956.
- Background with Chorus, 1956.
- The Woman from Sicily, 1957.
- A Tigress in Prothero, 1959.
- The Grace Divorce, 1960.
- Death of a Highbrow, 1961.
- Figures in the Foreground: Literary Reminiscences, 1963.
- Quadrille, 1965.
- A Galaxy of Fathers, 1966.
- Sanctuary, 1966.
- The Bright Lights, 1968.
- Reflections from a Village, 1969.
- On the Shady Side, 1970.
- Nor all thy Tears, 1972.
- Rosalind Passes, 1973.
- Some Achieve Greatness, 1976.
- Arnold Bennett: A Last Word, 1978.
