= A Son of the Sun (novel) =

1912 novel by Jack London

1st edition (publ. Doubleday, Page)

A Son of the Sun is a 1912 novel by Jack London. It is set in the South Pacific at the beginning of the 20th century and consists of eight separate stories. David Grief is a forty-year-old English adventurer who came to the South seas years ago and became rich. As a businessman he owns offices in Sydney, but he is rarely there. Since his wealth spreads over many islands, Grief has some adventures while travelling among these islands. London depicts the striking panorama of the South seas with adventurers, scoundrels, swindlers, pirates, and cannibals.

== Contents ==
- A Son of the Sun (collecting debts from a stubborn debitor, the hard way)
- The Proud Goat of Aloysius Pankburn (getting an alcoholic sober with hard work and ambition)
- The Devils of Fuatino (besieged by pirates and besieging them in return)
- The Jokers of New Gibbon (complicated dealings with man-eaters)
- A Little Account With Swithin Hall
- A Goboto Night
- The Feathers of the Sun (a crook introduces home-made paper money and is spanked with a particularly dead pig)
- The Pearls of Parlay
