= Riceyman Steps =

1923 novel by Arnold Bennett

Coordinates: 51°31′38″N 00°06′50″W

- First edition
- Author: Arnold Bennett
- Language: English
- Publisher: Cassell and Company Ltd
- Publication date: 1923
- Publication place: United Kingdom
- ISBN: 0-19-281373-0
- OCLC: 8928895
- Dewey Decimal: 823/.912 19
- LC Class: PR6003.E6 R5 1984

Riceyman Steps is a novel by British novelist Arnold Bennett, first published in 1923 and winner of that year's James Tait Black Memorial Prize for fiction. It follows a year in the life of Henry Earlforward, a miserly second-hand bookshop owner in the Clerkenwell area of London.

== Background ==
Arnold Bennett was a keen amateur sailor and it was while he was sailing on the Solent that he discovered a chaotic second-hand bookshop in Southampton. He visited the shop when bad weather prevented sailing and on one visit he bought a book on misers for sixpence. This book and the shop itself became the inspiration for this novel. Bennett also loved the Clerkenwell district of London, which, with its unpretentious working-class life reminded him of his own origins in the Potteries. The location Riceyman Steps was modelled on Granville Place (now Gwynne Place), the steps of which lead up from King's Cross Road to Granville Square. Bennett's steps are "twenty in number, ... divided by a half-landing into two series of ten", whereas the steps of Granville Place number (from the bottom) fifteen, with eleven more from the half-landing. Granville Square, now a residential square containing a small park, was in 1923 dominated by St Philip's Church, which was demolished in 1936.

== Plot summary ==
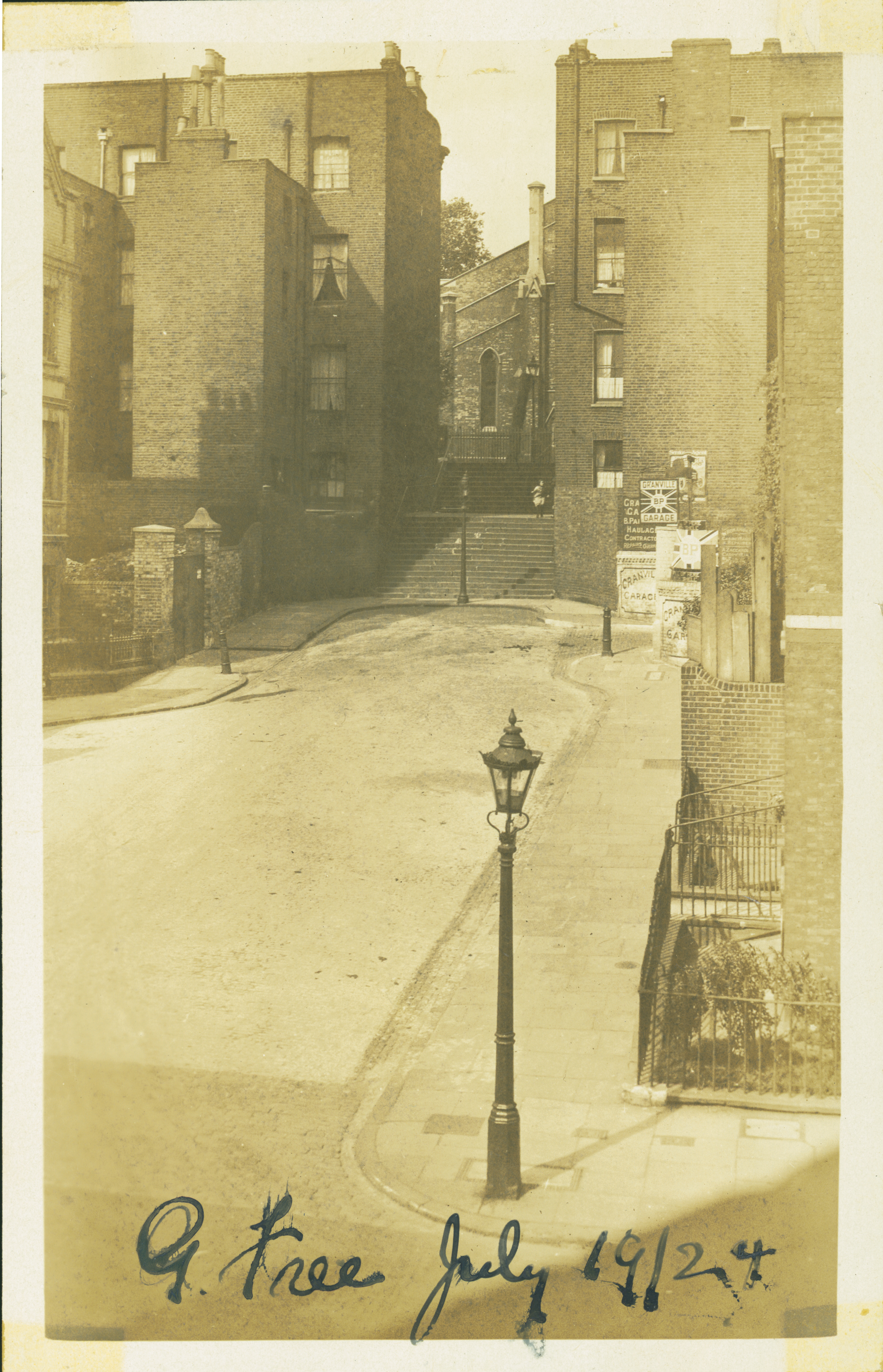
Granville Place in 1924, with 'Riceyman Steps' leading up to Granville Square.

The story takes place in 1919–1920, just after the First World War, and is divided into five parts. It deals with the final year in the life of its main character, Henry Earlforward, a miser with a slight limp, who keeps a second-hand bookshop in the Clerkenwell area of London, at Riceyman Steps. Henry harbours a secret passion for Violet Arb, a widow who inherits a neighbouring confectionery shop. When Henry tries to woo Violet, the widow realizes that they share the same charwoman and maid servant in the simple, loyal Elsie Sprickett.

When Elsie's boyfriend, the shell-shocked war veteran Joe, loses self-control and runs after Violet with a carving-knife at her shop, Henry gallantly intervenes after Violet approaches Henry for help. Violet, who sees in Henry a financially secure future, finally decides to marry him after a short courtship. Joe, meanwhile, disappears after writing a letter to Elsie that he will come for her when he has recovered from his traumatic disorder.

Henry's parsimony drives the married couple into an increasingly wretched existence. He is aghast, for example, when Violet spends fourteen pounds vacuuming his dusty shop as a wedding present. He begins eating less and less, even forgoing meat for cheese, and refuses to go to the hospital to treat his undernourishment when the doctor and his wife insist that he does. All the while Elsie stands devoted to the couple, despite having problems of her own—she pines secretly for Joe, and pilfers food to binge eat at night.

Their lives—in which Henry's passion for money and his obstinacy finally consume himself and his wife—are contrasted to that of their loyal maid servant Elsie Sprickett, and it is the latter, despite her extreme poverty, who brings life and a future to the bittersweet tale.

== Characters ==
- Henry Earlforward
- Violet Arb (later Earlforward)
- Elsie Sprickett
- Joe
- Dr Raste

The character of Elsie reappears in Elsie and the Child: A Tale of Riceyman Steps and Other Stories (1924).
