= Those United States =

1912 book by Arnold Bennett

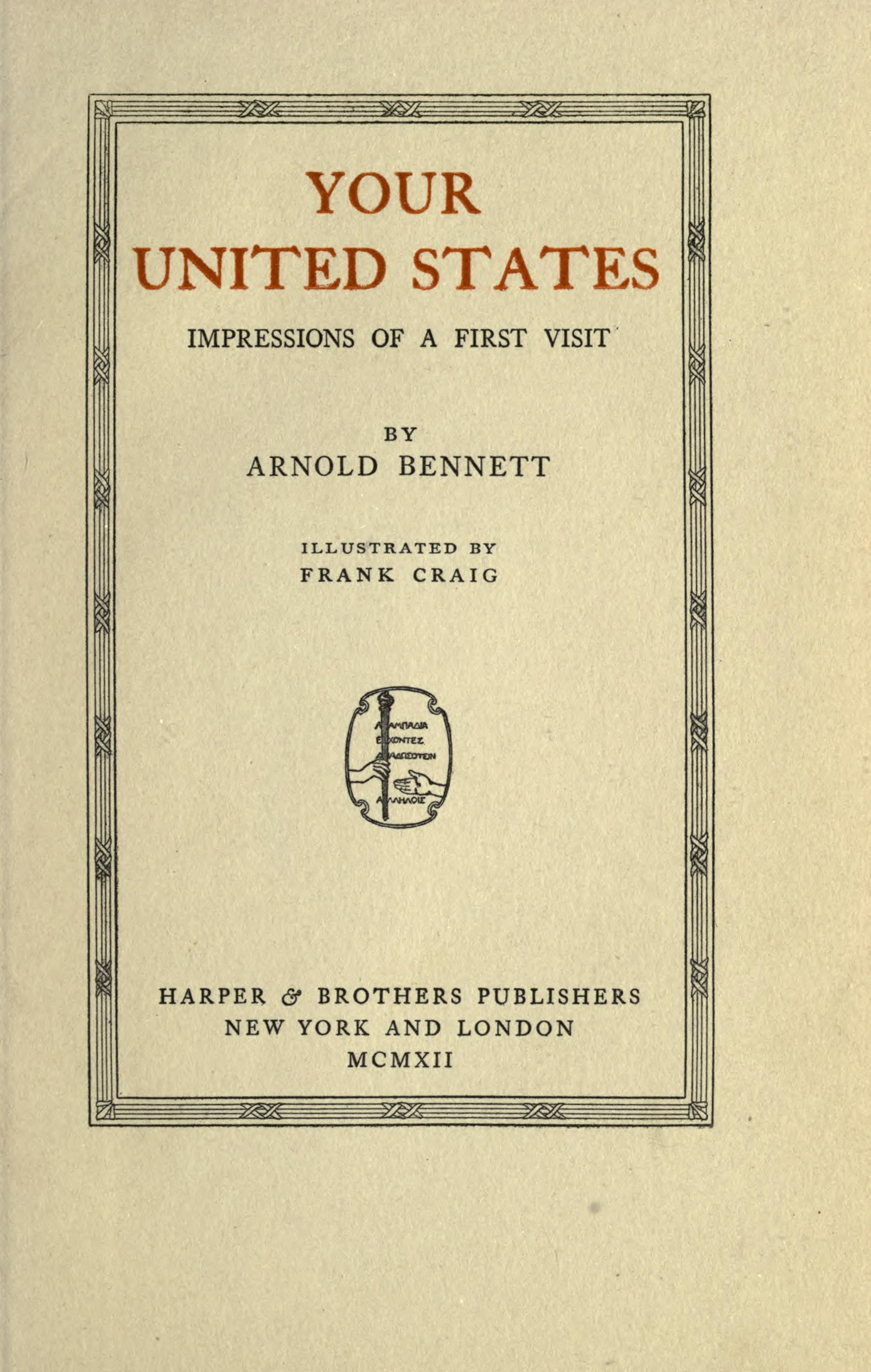
- American edition, 1912
- Author: Arnold Bennett
- Publisher: Martin Secker (UK); Harper (US)
- Publication date: 1912

Those United States, subtitled Impressions of a First Visit, is a book about Arnold Bennett's first journey (via a transatlantic steam ship) to the United States. Bennett was in the US from October to November 1911.

Those United States was serialized in Harper's Magazine from April to November 1912. It was published in book form as Your United States by Harper in November 1912. Martin Secker published Those United States in the UK in October 1912. Frank Craig illustrated it.

== Sources ==
- Hepburn, James G., ed. (1981). Arnold Bennett: The Critical Heritage. Routledge. ISBN 0-7100-0512-1. OCLC 7975399.
