= Arnold Bennett =

English author (1867–1931)

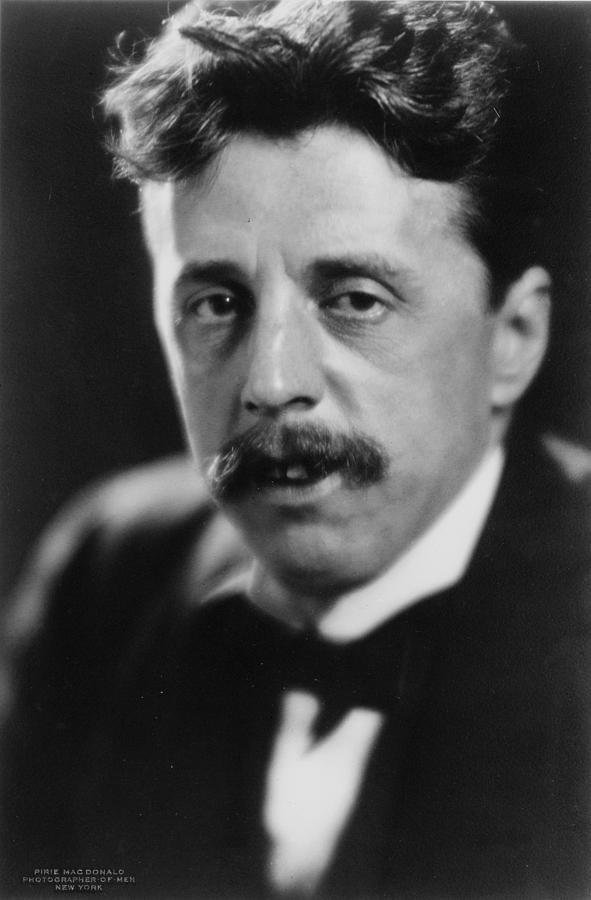
- Bennett c. 1920
- Born: Enoch Arnold Bennett; 27 May 1867; Hanley, Staffordshire, England
- Died: 27 March 1931 (aged 63); London, England
- Occupations: Novelist, playwright, journalist

Enoch Arnold Bennett (27 May 1867 – 27 March 1931) was an English author, best known as a novelist, who wrote prolifically. Between the 1890s and the 1930s he completed 34 novels, seven volumes of short stories, 13 plays (some in collaboration with other writers), and a daily journal totalling more than a million words. He wrote articles and stories for more than 100 newspapers and periodicals, worked in and briefly ran the Ministry of Information during the First World War, and wrote for the cinema in the 1920s. Sales of his books were substantial, and he was the most financially successful British author of his day.

Born into a modest but upwardly mobile family in Hanley, in the Staffordshire Potteries, Bennett was intended by his father, a solicitor, to follow him into the legal profession. Bennett worked for his father before moving to another law firm in London as a clerk at the age of 21. He became assistant editor and then editor of a women's magazine before becoming a full-time author in 1900. Always a devotee of French culture in general and French literature in particular, he moved to Paris in 1903; there the relaxed milieu helped him overcome his intense shyness, particularly with women. He spent ten years in France, marrying a Frenchwoman in 1907. In 1912 he moved back to England. He and his wife separated in 1921, and he spent the last years of his life with a new partner, an English actress. He died in 1931 of typhoid fever, having drunk contaminated tap water in France.

Many of Bennett's novels and short stories are set in a fictionalised version of the Staffordshire Potteries, which he called The Five Towns. He strongly believed that literature should be accessible to ordinary people, and he deplored literary cliques and élites. His books appealed to a wide public and sold in large numbers. For this reason, and for his adherence to realism, writers and supporters of the modernist school, notably Virginia Woolf, belittled him, and his fiction became neglected after his death. During his lifetime his journalistic "self-help" books sold in substantial numbers, and he was also a playwright. He did less well in the theatre than with novels but achieved two considerable successes with Milestones (1912) and The Great Adventure (1913).

Studies by Margaret Drabble (1974), John Carey (1992), and others have led to a re-evaluation of Bennett's work. Anna of the Five Towns (1902), The Old Wives' Tale (1908), Clayhanger (1910) and Riceyman Steps (1923) are considered the finest of his novels, and are now widely recognised as major works.

== Life and career ==
=== Early years ===
Arnold Bennett was born on 27 May 1867 in Hanley, Staffordshire, now part of Stoke-on-Trent but then a separate town. He was the eldest child of the three sons and three daughters (Note: Three other children died in infancy.) of Enoch Bennett and his wife Sarah Ann (née Longson). Enoch's early career had been one of mixed fortunes: after an unsuccessful attempt to run a business making and selling pottery, he set up as a draper and pawnbroker in 1866. Four years later, Enoch's father died, leaving him some money with which he articled himself to a local law firm; in 1876, he qualified as a solicitor. The Bennetts were staunch Wesleyans, musical, cultured and sociable. Enoch Bennett had an authoritarian side, but it was a happy household, although a mobile one: as Enoch's success as a solicitor increased, the family moved, within the space of five years in the late 1870s and early 1880s, to four different houses in Hanley and the neighbouring Burslem.

From 1877 to 1882, Bennett's schooling was at the Wedgwood Institute, Burslem, followed by a year at a grammar school in Newcastle-under-Lyme. He was good at Latin and better at French; he had an inspirational headmaster who gave him a love for French literature and the French language that lasted all his life. He did well academically and passed Cambridge University examinations that could have led to an Oxbridge education, but his father had other plans. In 1883, aged 16, Bennett left school and began work – unpaid – in his father's office. He divided his time between uncongenial jobs, such as rent collecting, during the day, and studying for examinations in the evening. He began writing in a modest way, contributing light pieces to the local newspaper. He became adept in Pitman's shorthand, a skill much sought after in commercial offices, and on the strength of that he secured a post as a clerk at a firm of solicitors in Lincoln's Inn Fields, London. In March 1889, aged 21, he left for London and never returned to live in his native county.

=== First years in London ===
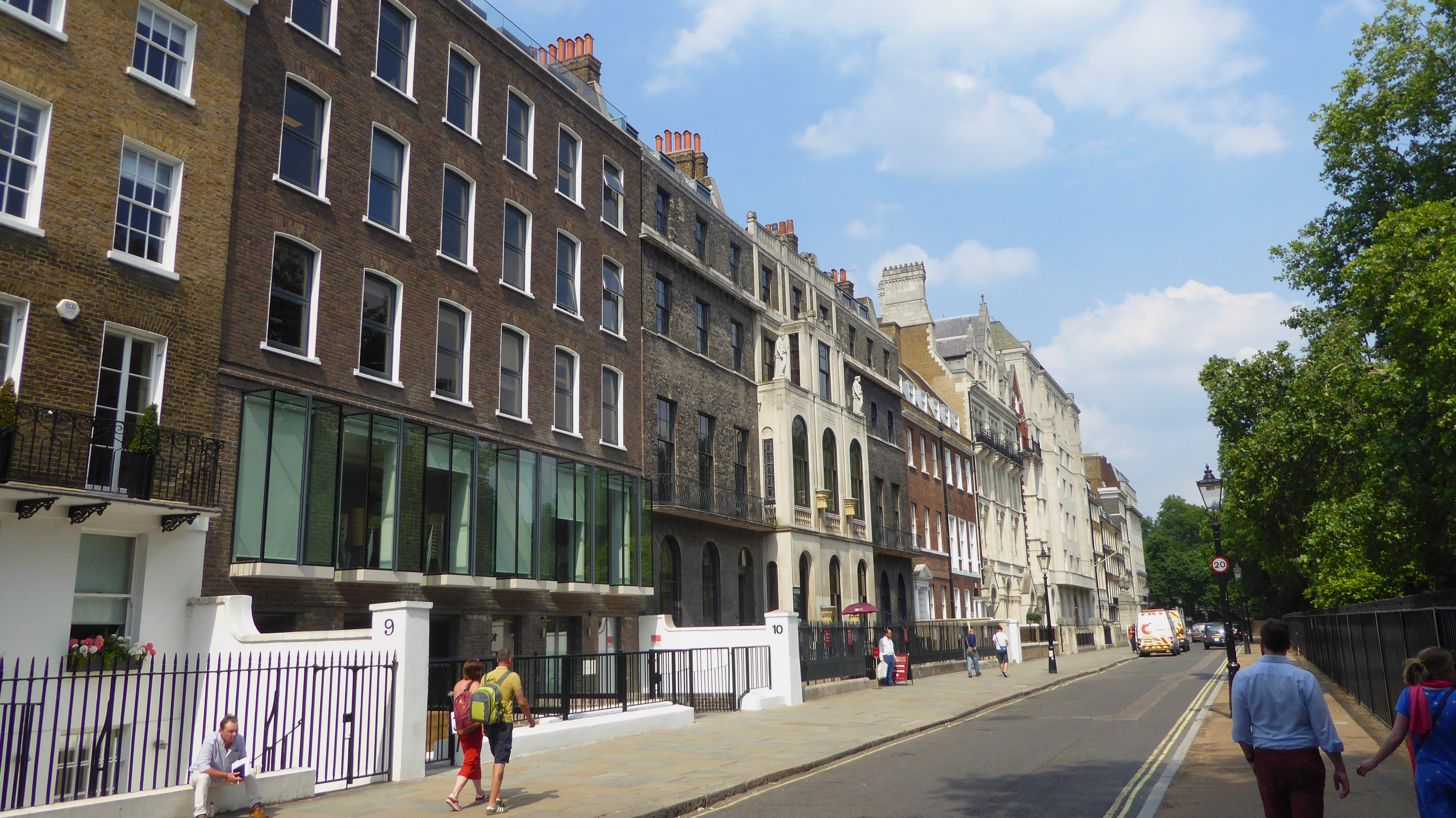
Lincoln's Inn Fields in 2018

In the solicitors' office in London, Bennett became friendly with a young colleague, John Eland, who had a passion for books. Eland's friendship helped alleviate Bennett's innate shyness, which was exacerbated by a lifelong stammer. (Note: Somerset Maugham, a friend of Bennett and a fellow-stammerer, observed, "It was painful to watch the struggle he sometimes had to get the words out. It was torture to him. Few realised the exhaustion it caused him to speak. What to most men is as easy as breathing was to him a constant strain. ... Few knew the distressing sense it gave rise to of a bar to complete contact with other men. It may be that except for the stammer which forced him to introspection, Arnold would never have become a writer".) Together, they explored the world of literature. Among the writers who impressed and influenced Bennett were George Moore, Émile Zola, Honoré de Balzac, Guy de Maupassant, Gustave Flaubert and Ivan Turgenev. He continued his own writing, and won a prize of twenty guineas from Tit-Bits in 1893 for his story 'The Artist's Model'; another short story, 'A Letter Home', was submitted successfully to The Yellow Book, where it featured in 1895 alongside contributions from Henry James and other well-known writers.

In 1894 Bennett resigned from the law firm and became assistant editor of the magazine Woman. The salary, £150 a year, was £50 less than he was earning as a clerk, (Note: £150 in 1894 is approximately equivalent to £17,000 in 2025, according to calculations based on Consumer Price Index measure of inflation.) but the post left him much more free time to write his first novel. For the magazine he wrote under a range of female pen-names such as "Barbara" and "Cecile". As his biographer Margaret Drabble puts it:

He did a bit of everything. He learned about recipes and layettes, about making-up, making-ready and running-round. He reviewed plays and books ... He acquainted himself with hundreds of subjects that would never have come his way otherwise ... the domestic column told one "How to train a Cook", "How to keep parsley fresh", "How to make money at home", "How to bath the baby (Part One)". The knowledge was not wasted, for Bennett is one of the few novelists who can write with sympathy and detail about the domestic preoccupations of women.

The informal office life of the magazine suited Bennett, not least because it brought him into lively female company, and he began to be a little more relaxed with young women. He continued work on his novel and wrote short stories and articles. He was modest about his literary talent: he wrote to a friend, "I have no inward assurance that I could ever do anything more than mediocre viewed strictly as art – very mediocre", but he knew he could "turn out things which would be read with zest, & about which the man in the street would say to friends 'Have you read so & so in the What-is-it?'" He was happy to write for popular journals like Hearth and Home or for the highbrow The Academy.

His debut novel, A Man from the North, completed in 1896, was published two years later, by John Lane, whose reader, John Buchan, recommended it for publication. It elicited a letter of praise from Joseph Conrad and was well and widely reviewed, but Bennett's profits from the sale of the book were less than the cost of having it typed.

In 1896 Bennett was promoted to be editor of Woman; by then he had set his sights on a career as a full-time author, but he served as editor for four years. During that time he wrote two popular books, described by the critic John Lucas as "pot-boilers": Journalism for Women (1898) and Polite Farces for the Drawing Room (1899). He also began work on a second novel, Anna of the Five Towns, the five towns being Bennett's lightly fictionalised version of the Staffordshire Potteries, where he grew up.

=== Freelance; Paris ===
In 1900 Bennett resigned his post at Woman, and left London to set up house at Trinity Hall Farm, near the village of Hockliffe in Bedfordshire, where he made a home not only for himself but for his parents and younger sister. He completed Anna of the Five Towns in 1901; it was published the following year, as was its successor, The Grand Babylon Hotel. The latter, an extravagant story of crime in high society, sold 50,000 copies in hardback and was almost immediately translated into four languages. By this stage he was confident enough in his abilities to tell a friend:

Although I am 33 & I have not made a name, I infallibly know that I shall make a name, & that soon. But I should like to be a legend. I think I have settled in my own mind that my work will never be better than third rate, judged by the high standards, but I shall be cunning enough to make it impose on my contemporaries.

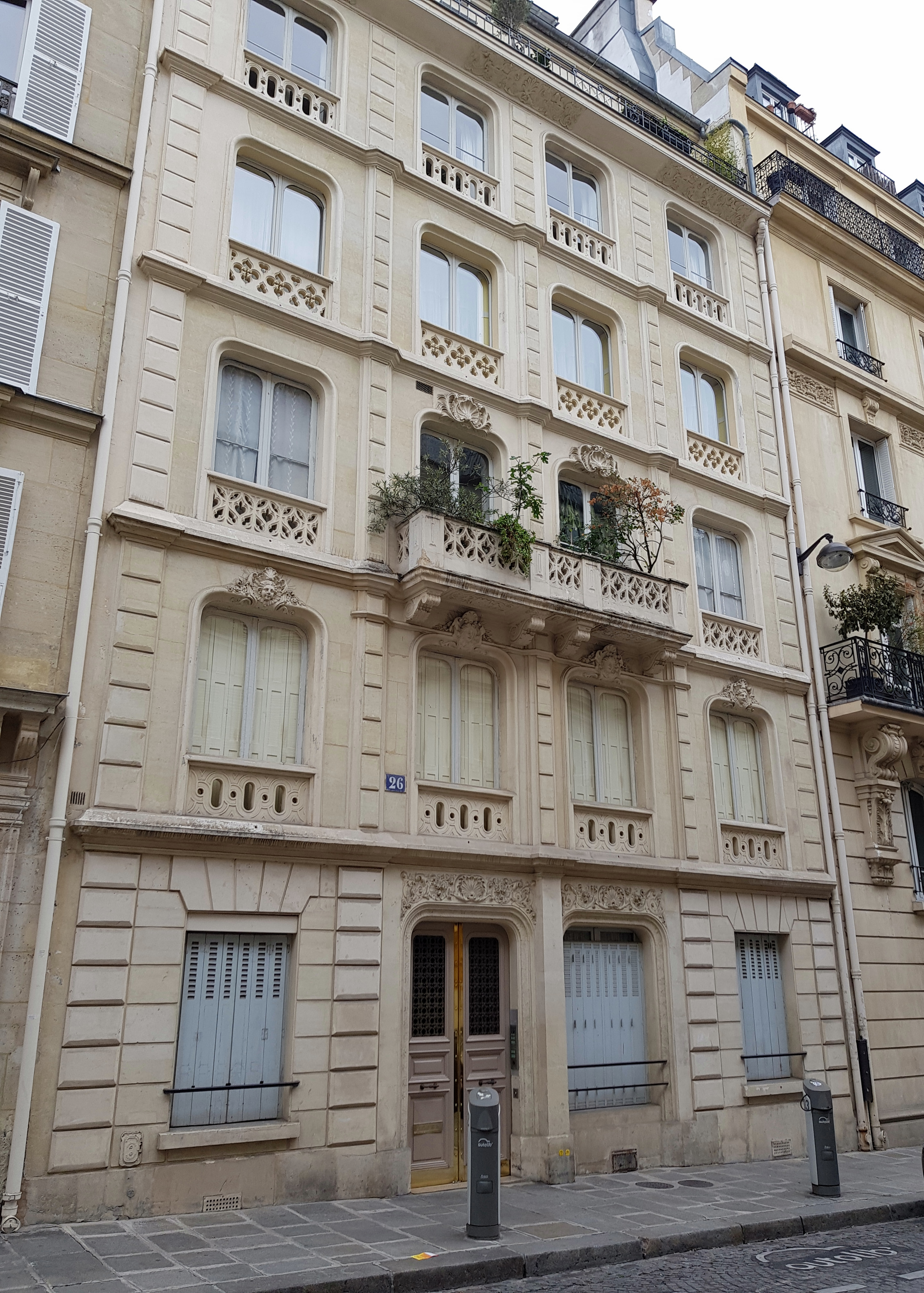
Rue d'Aumale, Bennett's second address in Paris

In January 1902 Enoch Bennett died, after a decline into dementia. His widow chose to move back to Burslem, and Bennett's sister married shortly afterwards. With no dependants, Bennett − always a devotee of French culture − decided to move to Paris; he took up residence there in March 1903. Biographers have speculated on his precise reasons for doing so. Drabble suggests that perhaps "he was hoping for some kind of liberation. He was thirty-five and unmarried"; Lucas writes that it was almost certainly Bennett's desire to be recognised as a serious artist that prompted his move; according to his friend and colleague Frank Swinnerton, Bennett was following in the footsteps of George Moore by going to live in "the home of modern realism"; in the view of the biographer Reginald Pound it was "to begin his career as a man of the world". The 9th arrondissement of Paris was Bennett's home for the next five years, first in the rue de Calais, near the Place Pigalle, and then the more upmarket rue d'Aumale.

Life in Paris evidently helped Bennett overcome much of his remaining shyness with women. His journals for his early months in Paris mention a young woman identified as "C" or "Chichi", who was a chorus girl; the journals – or at least the cautiously selected extracts published since his death – do not record the precise nature of the relationship, but the two spent a considerable amount of time together.

In a restaurant where he dined frequently a trivial incident in 1903 gave Bennett the germ of an idea for the novel generally regarded as his masterpiece. A grotesque old woman came in and caused a fuss; the beautiful young waitress laughed at her, and Bennett was struck by the thought that the old woman had once been as young and lovely as the waitress. From this grew the story of two contrasting sisters in The Old Wives' Tale. He did not begin work on that novel until 1907, before which he wrote ten others, some "sadly undistinguished", in the view of his biographer Kenneth Young. Throughout his career, Bennett interspersed his best novels with some that his biographers and others have labelled pot-boilers.

=== Marriage; Fontainebleau and US visit ===
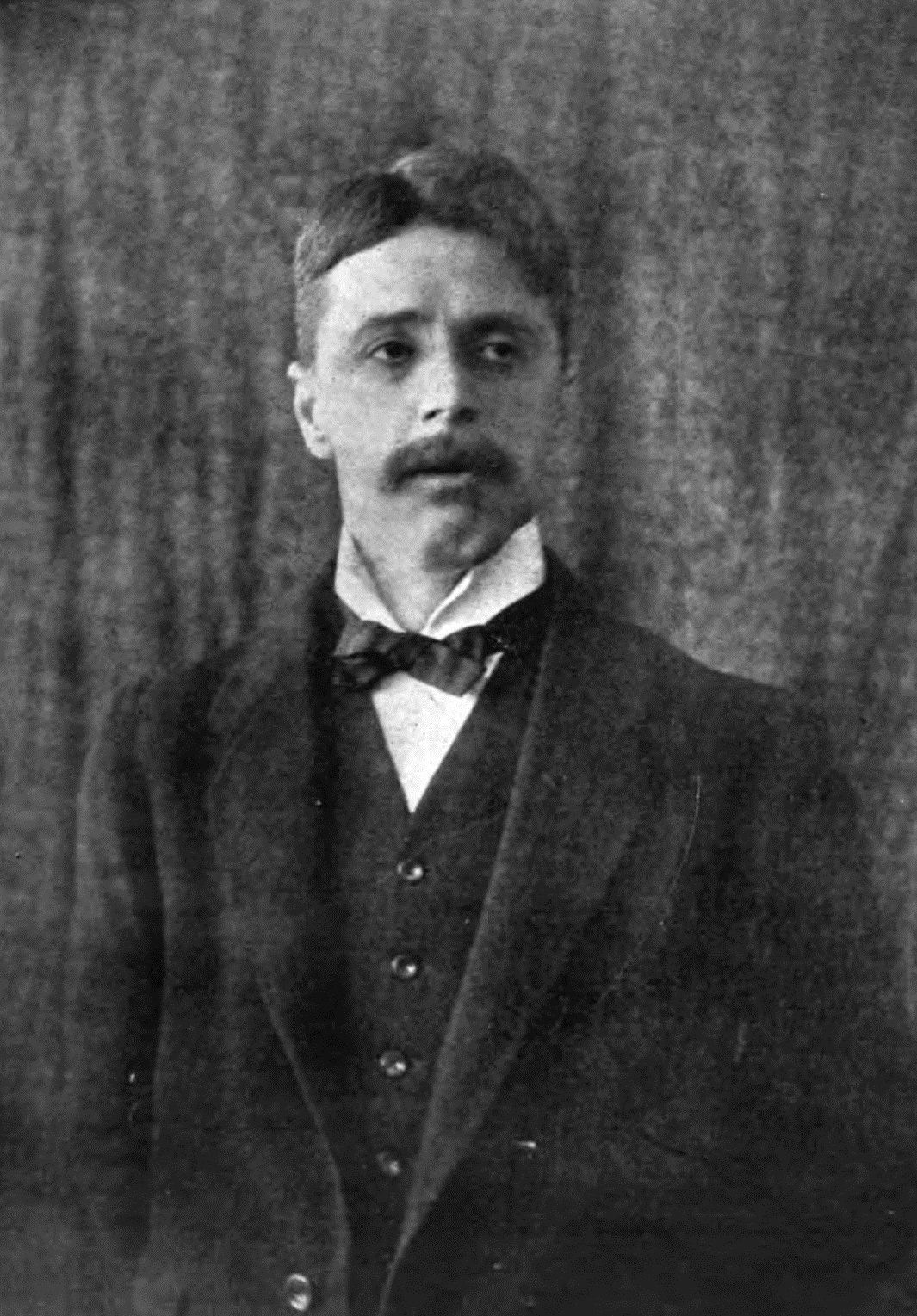
Bennett, c. 1910

In 1905 Bennett became engaged to Eleanor Green, a member of an eccentric and capricious American family living in Paris, but at the last moment, after the wedding invitations had been sent out, she broke off the engagement and almost immediately married a fellow American. Drabble comments that Bennett was well rid of her, but it was a painful episode in his life. In early 1907 he met Marguerite Soulié (1874–1960), who soon became first a friend and then a lover. In May he was taken ill with a severe gastric complaint, and Marguerite moved into his flat to look after him. They became still closer, and in July 1907, shortly after his fortieth birthday, they were married at the Mairie of the 9th arrondissement. The marriage was childless. Early in 1908 the couple moved from the rue d'Aumale to the Villa des Néfliers in Fontainebleau-Avon, about 40 miles (64 km) south-east of Paris. (Note: "Néfliers" translates into English as "medlar trees". In Bennett's time the house was called "Villa des Néfliers", but is evidently now the "Villa les Néfliers".)

Lucas comments that the best of the novels written while in France – Whom God Hath Joined (1906), The Old Wives' Tale (1908), and Clayhanger (1910) – "justly established Bennett as a major exponent of realistic fiction". In addition to these, Bennett published lighter novels such as The Card (1911). His output of literary journalism included articles for T. P. O'Connor's T. P.'s Weekly and the left-wing The New Age; his pieces for the latter, published under a pen-name, were concise literary essays aimed at "the general cultivated reader", a form taken up by a later generation of writers including J. B. Priestley and V. S. Pritchett.

In 1911 Bennett made a financially rewarding visit to the US, which he later recorded in his 1912 book Those United States. Crossing the Atlantic aboard the Lusitania, he visited not only New York and Boston but also Chicago, Indianapolis, Washington and Philadelphia in a tour that was described by the US publisher George Doran as "one of continuous triumph": in the first three days of his stay in New York he was interviewed 26 times by journalists. While his rival E. P. Dutton had secured rights to such Bennett novels as Hilda Lessways and the Card (retitled Denry the Audacious), Doran, who travelled everywhere with Bennett while in America, was the publisher of Bennett's wildly successful 'pocket philosophies' How to Live on Twenty-Four Hours a Day and Mental Efficiency. Of these books the influential critic Willard Huntington Wright wrote that Bennett had "turned preacher and a jolly good preacher he is". While in the US Bennett also sold the serial rights of his forthcoming novel, The Price of Love (1913–14), to Harpers for £2,000, eight essays to Metropolitan magazine for a total of £1,200, and the American rights of a successor to Clayhanger for £3,000.

During his ten years in France he had gone from a moderately well-known writer enjoying modest sales to outstanding success. Swinnerton comments that in addition to his large sales, Bennett's critical prestige was at its zenith.

=== Return to England ===
Scene from Act 2 of the 1912 play Milestones, by Bennett and Edward Knoblauch

In 1912, after an extended stay at the Hotel Californie in Cannes, during which time he wrote The Regent, a light-hearted sequel to The Card, Bennett and his wife moved from France to England. Initially they lived in Putney, but "determined to become an English country landowner", he bought Comarques, an early-18th-century country house at Thorpe-le-Soken, Essex, and moved there in February 1913. Among his early concerns, once back in England, was to succeed as a playwright. He had dabbled previously but his inexperience showed. The Times thought his 1911 comedy The Honeymoon, staged in the West End with a starry cast, (Note: The cast included Dion Boucicault, W. Graham Brown, Dennis Eadie, Basil Hallam, Kate Serjeantson and Marie Tempest.) had "one of the most amusing first acts we have ever seen", but fell flat in the other two acts. In the same year Bennett met the playwright Edward Knoblauch (later Knoblock) and they collaborated on Milestones, the story of the generations of a family seen in 1860, 1885 and 1912. The combination of Bennett's narrative gift and Knoblauch's practical experience proved a success. The play was strongly cast, (Note: The cast included Lionel Atwill, Gladys Cooper, Dennis Eadie, Mary Jerrold, Owen Nares and Haidee Wright.) received highly favourable notices, ran for more than 600 performances in London and over 200 in New York, and made Bennett a great deal of money. His next play, The Great Adventure (1913), a stage version of his novel Buried Alive (1908), was similarly successful.

Bennett's attitude to the First World War was that British politicians had been at fault in failing to prevent it, but that once it had become inevitable it was right that Britain should join its allies against the Germans. He concentrated his attention on journalism, aiming to inform and encourage the public in Britain and allied and neutral countries. He served on official and unofficial committees, and in 1915 he was invited to visit France to see conditions at the front and write about them for readers at home. The collected impressions appeared in a book called Over There (1915). He was still writing novels, however: These Twain, the third in his Clayhanger trilogy, was published in 1916 and in 1917 he completed a sequel, The Roll Call, which ends with its hero, George Cannon, enlisting in the army. Wartime London was the setting for Bennett's The Pretty Lady (1918), about a high-class French cocotte: although well reviewed, because of its subject-matter the novel provoked "a Hades of a row" and some booksellers refused to sell it.

When Lord Beaverbrook became Minister of Information in February 1918 he appointed Bennett to take charge of propaganda in France. Beaverbrook fell ill in October 1918 and made Bennett director of propaganda, in charge of the whole ministry for the last weeks of the war. At the end of 1918 Bennett was offered, but declined, a knighthood in the new Order of the British Empire instituted by George V. The offer was renewed some time later, and again Bennett refused it. One of his closest associates at the time suspected that he was privately hoping for the more prestigious Order of Merit.

As the war was ending, Bennett returned to his theatrical interests, although not primarily as a playwright. In November 1918 he became chairman, with Nigel Playfair as managing director, of the Lyric Theatre, Hammersmith. Among their productions were Abraham Lincoln by John Drinkwater, and The Beggar's Opera, which, in Swinnerton's phrase, "caught different moods of the post-war spirit", and ran for 466 and 1,463 performances respectively.

=== Last years ===
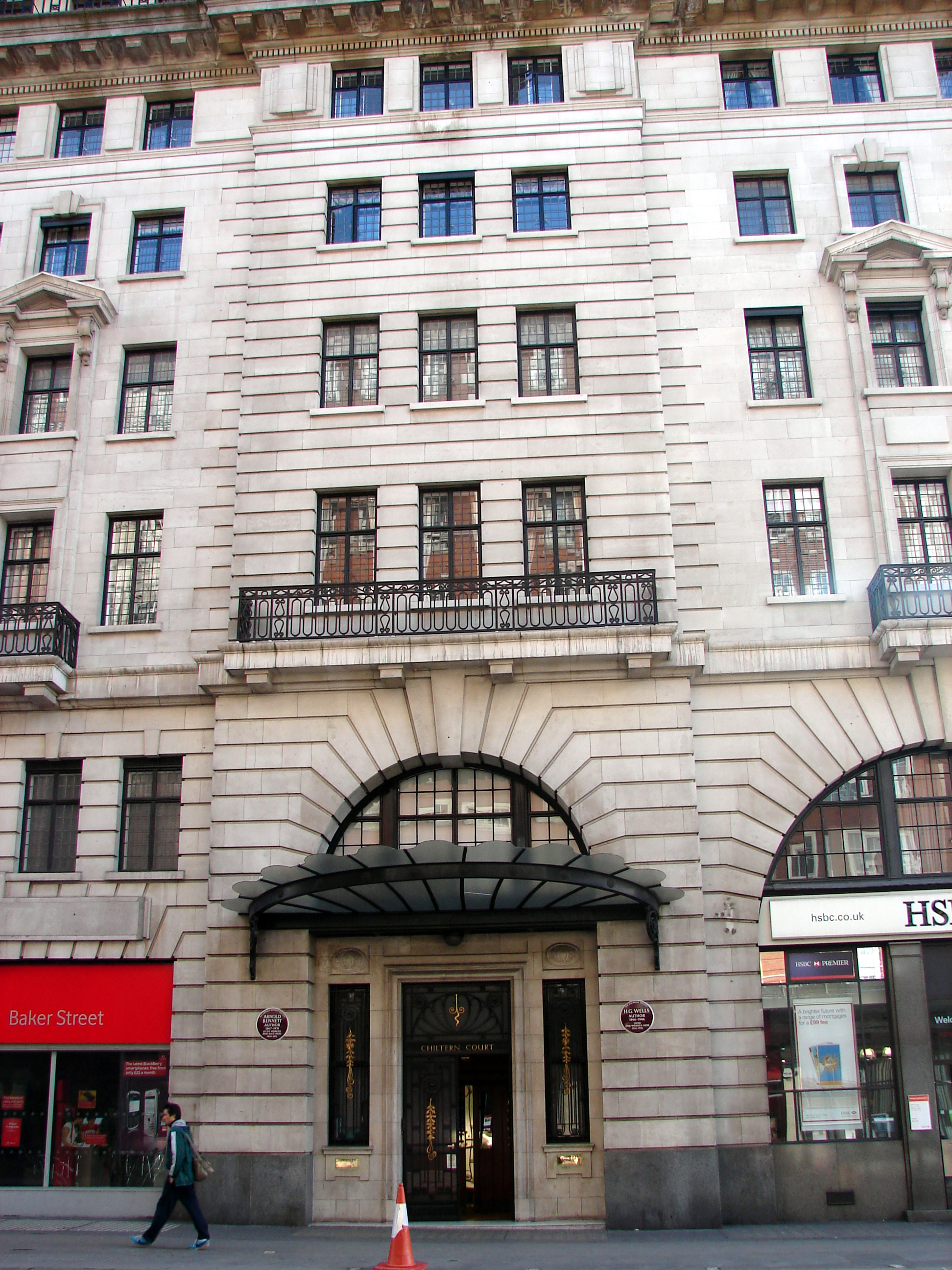
Chiltern Court – Bennett's last home, with plaques commemorating him and H. G. Wells

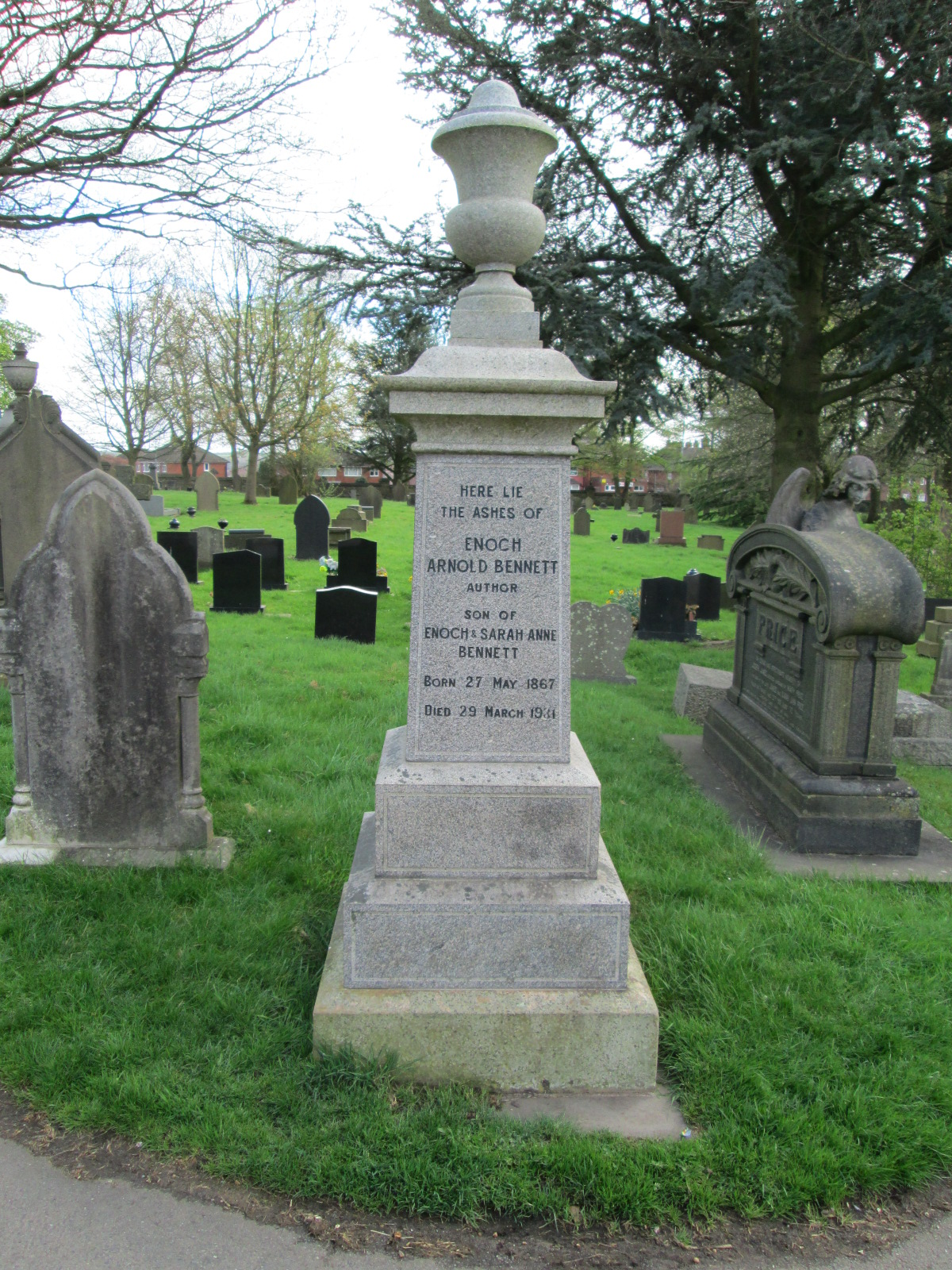
Memorial in Burslem Cemetery (Note: The inscription gives the date of his death as 29 March 1931, although in fact he died at 8.50 p.m. on 27 March.)

In 1921 Bennett and his wife legally separated. They had been drifting apart for some years and Marguerite had taken up with Pierre Legros, a young French lecturer. Bennett sold Comarques and lived in London for the rest of his life, first in a flat near Bond Street in the West End, on which he had taken a lease during the war. For much of the 1920s he was widely known to be the highest-paid literary journalist in England, contributing a weekly column to Beaverbrook's Evening Standard under the title 'Books and Persons'; according to Frank Swinnerton, these articles were "extraordinarily successful and influential ... and made a number of new reputations". (Note: The columns for The Evening Standard are collected in Arnold Bennett: The Evening Standard Years – "Books and Persons" 1926–1931, published in 1974.) By the end of his career, Bennett had contributed to more than 100 newspapers, magazines and other publications. He continued to write novels and plays as assiduously as before the war.

Swinnerton writes, "Endless social engagements; inexhaustible patronage of musicians, actors, poets, and painters; the maximum of benevolence to friends and strangers alike, marked the last ten years of his life". Hugh Walpole, James Agate and Osbert Sitwell were among those who testified to Bennett's generosity. Sitwell recalled a letter Bennett wrote in the 1920s:

I find I am richer this year than last; so I enclose a cheque for 500 pounds for you to distribute among young writers and artists and musicians who may need the money. You will know, better than I do, who they are. But I must make one condition, that you do not reveal that the money has come from me, or tell anyone about it. (Note: Sitwell recorded that Bennett's practice of anonymous philanthropy was continued by the latter's protégé Hugh Walpole.)

In 1922 Bennett met and fell in love with an actress, Dorothy Cheston (1891–1977). Together they set up home in Cadogan Square, where they stayed until moving in 1930 to Chiltern Court, Baker Street. As Marguerite would not agree to a divorce, (Note: Drabble ascribes her obduracy to a combination of the vindictive and the mercenary – no divorce court would award a settlement as advantageous to her as the highly generous terms given to her by Bennett at their separation.) Bennett was unable to marry Dorothy, and in September 1928, having become pregnant, she changed her name by deed poll to Dorothy Cheston Bennett. (Note: Such recourse was familiar at the time, when unmarried couples were expected to make a token pretence of being married: in similar circumstances Sir Henry Wood's partner changed her name by deed poll to "Lady Jessie Wood", and as late as the 1950s Jane Grigson similarly took her undivorced partner's surname. Dorothy was never formally "Mrs Bennett", but after she and Marguerite were both present at the memorial service for Bennett, in St Clement Danes on 31 March 1931, The Times addressed the problem by referring to them as "Mrs Dorothy Bennett" and "Mrs Arnold Bennett" respectively.) The following April she gave birth to the couple's only child, Virginia Mary (1929–2003). She continued to appear as an actress, and produced and starred in a revival of Milestones which was well reviewed, but had only a moderate run. Bennett had mixed feelings about her continuing stage career, but did not seek to stop it.

During a holiday in France with Dorothy in January 1931, Bennett twice drank tap water – not, at the time, a safe thing to do there. On his return home he was taken ill; influenza was diagnosed at first, but the illness was typhoid fever; after several weeks of unsuccessful treatment he died in his flat at Chiltern Court on 27 March 1931, aged 63. (Note: In his last hours the local authority agreed that straw should be spread in the street outside Bennett's flat to dull the sound of traffic. This is believed to be the last time this traditional practice was carried out in London.)

Bennett was cremated at Golders Green Crematorium and his ashes were interred in Burslem Cemetery in his mother's grave. A memorial service was held on 31 March 1931 at St Clement Danes, London, attended by leading figures from journalism, literature, music, politics and theatre, and, in Pound's words, many men and women who at the end of the service "walked out into a London that for them would never be the same again".

== Works ==
From the outset, Bennett believed in the "democratisation of art which it is surely the duty of the minority to undertake". He admired some of the modernist writers of his time, but strongly disapproved of their conscious appeal to a small élite and their disdain for the general reader. Bennett believed that literature should be inclusive, accessible to ordinary people.

From the start of his career, Bennett was aware of the appeal of regional fiction. Anthony Trollope, George Eliot and Thomas Hardy had created and sustained their own locales, and Bennett did the same with his Five Towns, drawing on his experiences as a boy and young man. As a realistic writer he followed the examples of the authors he admired – above all George Moore, but also Honoré de Balzac, Gustave Flaubert and Guy de Maupassant among French writers, and Fyodor Dostoevsky, Ivan Turgenev and Leo Tolstoy among Russians. In writing about the Five Towns, Bennett aimed to portray the experiences of ordinary people coping with the norms and constraints of the communities in which they lived. J. B. Priestley considered that the next influence on Bennett's fiction was his time in London in the 1890s, "engaged in journalism and ingenious pot-boiling of various kinds."

=== Novels and short stories ===
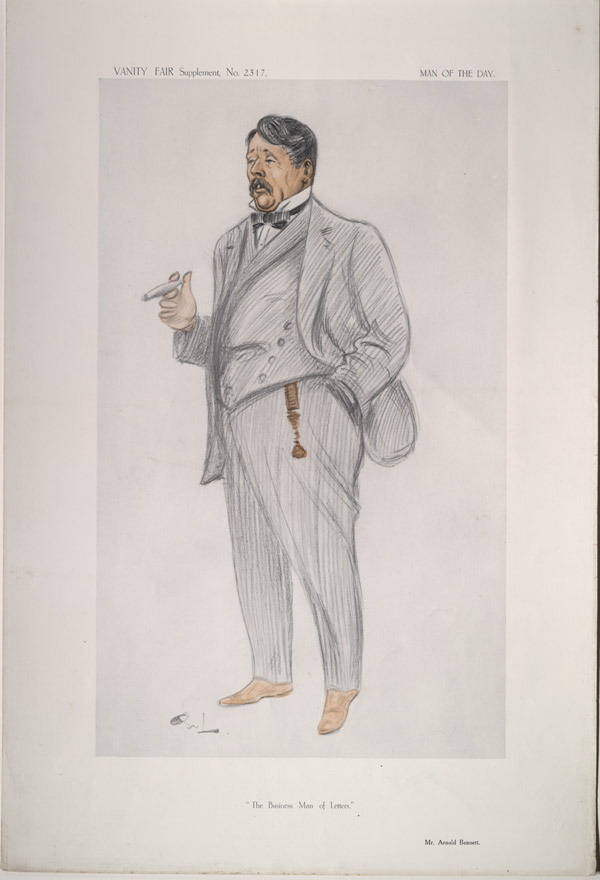
Bennett, caricatured by "Owl" in Vanity Fair, 1913

Bennett is remembered chiefly for his novels and short stories. The best known are set in, or feature people from, the six towns of the Potteries of his youth. He presented the region as "the Five Towns", which correspond closely with their originals: the real-life Burslem, Hanley, Longton, Stoke and Tunstall become Bennett's Bursley, Hanbridge, Longshaw, Knype and Turnhill. (Note: The omitted town is Fenton, an omission that still rankles with some local people in the 21st century.) These "Five Towns" make their first appearance in Bennett's fiction in Anna of the Five Towns (1902) and are the setting for further novels including Leonora (1903), Whom God Hath Joined (1906), The Old Wives' Tale (1908) and the Clayhanger trilogy – Clayhanger (1910), Hilda Lessways (1911) and These Twain (1916) – as well as for dozens of short stories. Bennett's fiction portrays the Five Towns with what The Oxford Companion to English Literature calls "an ironic but affectionate detachment, describing provincial life and culture in documentary detail, and creating many memorable characters". In later life Bennett said that the writer George Moore was "the father of all my Five Towns books" as it was reading Moore's 1885 novel A Mummer's Wife, set in the Potteries, that "opened my eyes to the romantic nature of the district I had blindly inhabited for over twenty years". Earlier, Bennett's view of his home town had been stimulated by H.G. Wells's 1895 short story The Cone, set in the Potteries: in 1897, at the start of their long friendship, he wrote to Wells that he was "very glad to find that the Potteries made such an impression on you. I lived there till I was 21, & have been away from it for 9 years, & only during the last few years have I begun to see its possibilities. ... [T]here is an aspect of these industrial districts which is really grandiose, full of dark splendours, & which has been absolutely missed by all novelists up to date."

It was not only locations on which Bennett drew for his fiction. Many of his characters are discernibly based on real people in his life. His Lincoln's Inn friend John Eland was a source for Mr Aked in Bennett's first novel, A Man from the North (1898); A Great Man (1903) contains a character with echoes of his Parisienne friend Chichi; Darius Clayhanger's early life is based on that of a family friend and Bennett himself is seen in Edwin in Clayhanger. He has been criticised for making literary use in that novel of the distressing details of his father's decline into senility, but in Pound's view, in committing the details to paper Bennett was unburdening himself of painful memories.

These Twain is Bennett's "last extended study of Five Towns life". The novels he wrote in the 1920s are largely set in London and thereabouts: Riceyman Steps (1923), for instance, generally regarded as the best of Bennett's post-war novels, was set in Clerkenwell: it was awarded the James Tait Black novel prize for 1923, "the first prize for a book I ever had", Bennett noted in his journal on 18 October 1924. His Lord Raingo (1926), described by Dudley Barker as "one of the finest of political novels in the language", benefited from Bennett's own experience in the Ministry of Information and his subsequent friendship with Beaverbrook: John Lucas states that "As a study of what goes on in the corridors of power [Lord Raingo] has few equals". And Bennett's final – and longest – novel, Imperial Palace (1930), is set in a grand London hotel reminiscent of the Savoy, whose directors assisted him in his preliminary research.

Bennett usually gave his novels subtitles; the most frequent was "A fantasia on modern themes", (Note: There were six "Fantasias": The Grand Babylon Hotel (1902); Teresa of Watling Street (1904); Hugo (1906); The Ghost (1907); The City of Pleasure (1907) and The Vanguard (1927).) individual books were called "A frolic" or "A melodrama", but he was sparing with the label "A novel" which he used for only a few of his books – for instance Anna of the Five Towns, Leonora, Sacred and Profane Love, The Old Wives' Tale, The Pretty Lady (1918) and Riceyman Steps. Literary critics have followed Bennett in dividing his novels into groups. The literary scholar Kurt Koenigsberger proposes three categories. In the first are the long narratives – "freestanding, monumental artefacts" – Anna of the Five Towns, The Old Wives' Tale, Clayhanger and Riceyman Steps, which "have been held in high critical regard since their publication". Koenigsberger writes that the "Fantasias" such as The Grand Babylon Hotel (1902), Teresa of Watling Street (1904) and The City of Pleasure (1907), have "mostly passed from public attention along with the 'modern' conditions they exploit". His third group includes "Idyllic Diversions" or "Stories of Adventure", including Helen with the High Hand (1910), The Card (1911), and The Regent (1913), which "have sustained some enduring critical and popular interest, not least for their amusing treatment of cosmopolitanism and provinciality".

Bennett published 96 short stories in seven volumes between 1905 and 1931. His ambivalence about his native town is vividly seen in "The Death of Simon Fuge" in the collection The Grim Smile of the Five Towns (1907), judged by Lucas the finest of all the stories. His chosen locations ranged widely, including Paris and Venice as well as London and the Five Towns. As with his novels, he would sometimes give a story a label, calling "The Matador of the Five Towns" (1912) "a tragedy" and "Jock-at-a-Venture" from the same collection "a frolic". The short stories, particularly those in Tales of the Five Towns (1905), The Grim Smile of the Five Towns (1907), and The Matador of the Five Towns contain some of the most striking examples of Bennett's concern for realism, with an unflinching narrative focus on what Lucas calls "the drab, the squalid, and the mundane". In 2010 and 2011 two further volumes of Bennett's hitherto uncollected short stories were published: they range from his earliest work written in the 1890s, some under the pseudonym Sarah Volatile, to US magazine commissions from the late 1920s.

=== Stage and screen ===
In 1931 the critic Graham Sutton, looking back at Bennett's career in the theatre, contrasted his achievements as a playwright with those as a novelist, suggesting that Bennett was a complete novelist but a not-entirely-complete dramatist. His plays were clearly those of a novelist: "He tends to lengthy speeches. Sometimes he overwrites a part as though distrusting the actor. He is more interested in what his people are than in what they visibly do. He 'thinks nowt' of mere slickness of plot."

The Great Adventure, 1913

Bennett's lack of a theatrical grounding showed in the uneven construction of some of his plays, such as his 1911 comedy The Honeymoon, which played for 125 performances from October 1911. The highly successful Milestones was seen as impeccably constructed but the credit for that was given to his craftsmanlike collaborator, Edward Knoblauch (Bennett being credited with the inventive flair of the piece). By far his most successful solo effort in the theatre was The Great Adventure, based on his 1908 novel Buried Alive, which ran in the West End for 674 performances, from March 1913 to November 1914. Sutton praised its "new strain of impish and sardonic fantasy" and rated it a much finer play than Milestones.

After the First World War, Bennett wrote two plays on metaphysical questions, Sacred and Profane Love (1919, adapted from his novel) and Body and Soul (1922), which made little impression. The Saturday Review praised the "shrewd wit" of the former, but thought it "false in its essentials ... superficial in its accidentals". Of the latter, the critic Horace Shipp wondered "how the author of Clayhanger and The Old Wives' Tale could write such third-rate stuff". Bennett had more success in a final collaboration with Edward Knoblock (as Knoblauch had become during the war) with Mr Prohack (1927), a comedy based on his 1922 novel; one critic wrote "I could have enjoyed the play had it run to double its length", but even so he judged the middle act weaker than the outer two. Sutton concludes that Bennett's forte was character, but that the competence of his technique was variable. The plays are seldom revived, although some have been adapted for television.

Bennett wrote two opera libretti for the composer Eugene Goossens: Judith (one act, 1929) and Don Juan (four acts, produced in 1937 after the writer's death). There were comments that Goossens's music lacked tunes and Bennett's libretti were too wordy and literary. The critic Ernest Newman defended both works, finding Bennett's libretto for Judith "a drama told simply and straightforwardly" and Don Juan "the best thing that English opera has so far produced ... the most dramatic and stageworthy", but though politely received, both operas vanished from the repertory after a few performances.

Bennett took a keen interest in the cinema, and in 1920 wrote The Wedding Dress, a scenario for a silent movie, at the request of Jesse Lasky of the Famous Players film company. It was never made, though Bennett wrote a full-length treatment, assumed to be lost until his daughter Virginia found it in a drawer in her Paris home in 1983; subsequently the script was sold to the Potteries Museum and Art Gallery and was finally published in 2013. In 1928 Bennett wrote the scenario for the silent film Piccadilly, directed by E. A. Dupont and starring Anna May Wong, described by the British Film Institute as "one of the true greats of British silent films". In 1929, the year the film came out, Bennett was in discussion with a young Alfred Hitchcock to script a silent film, Punch and Judy, which foundered on artistic disagreements and Bennett's refusal to see the film as a "talkie" rather than silent. His original scenario, acquired by Pennsylvania State University, was published in the UK in 2012.

=== Journalism and self-help books ===
Bennett published more than two dozen non-fiction books, among which eight could be classified as "self-help": the most enduring is How to Live on 24 Hours a Day (1908), which is still in print and has been translated into several languages. Other "self-help" volumes include How to Become an Author (1903), The Reasonable Life (1907), Literary Taste: How to Form It (1909), The Human Machine (1908), Mental Efficiency (1911), The Plain Man and his Wife (1913), Self and Self-Management (1918) and How to Make the Best of Life (1923). They were, says Swinnerton, "written for small fees and with a real desire to assist the ignorant". According to the Harvard academic Beth Blum, these books "advance less scientific versions of the argument for mental discipline espoused by William James".

In his biography of Bennett, Patrick Donovan argues that in the US "the huge appeal to the ordinary readers" of his self-help books "made his name stand out vividly from other English writers across the massive, fragmented American market." As Bennett put it to his London-based agent J. B. Pinker, these "pocket philosophies are just the sort of book for the American public". However, How to Live on 24 Hours was aimed initially at "the legions of clerks and typists and other meanly paid workers caught up in the explosion of British office jobs around the turn of the century … they offered a strong message of hope from somebody who so well understood their lives".

Bennett never lost his journalistic instincts, and throughout his life sought and responded to newspaper and magazine commissions with varying degrees of enthusiasm: "from the start of the 1890s right up to the week of his death there would never be a period when he was not churning out copy for newspapers and magazines". In a journal entry at the end of 1908, for instance, he noted that he had written "over sixty newspaper articles" that year; in 1910 the figure was "probably about 80 other articles". While living in Paris he was a regular contributor to T. P.'s Weekly; later he reviewed for The New Age under the pseudonym Jacob Tonson and was associated with the New Statesman as not only a writer but also a director.

=== Journals ===
Inspired by the Journal des Goncourt, Bennett kept a journal throughout his adult life. Swinnerton says that it runs to a million words; it has not been published in full. Edited extracts were issued in three volumes, in 1932 and 1933. According to Hugh Walpole, the editor, Newman Flower, "was so appalled by much of what he found in the journals that he published only brief extracts, and those the safest". Whatever Flower censored, the extracts he selected were not always "the safest": he let some defamatory remarks through, and in 1935 he, the publishers and printers had to pay an undisclosed sum to the plaintiff in one libel suit and £2,500 in another.

== Critical reputation ==
=== Novels and short stories ===
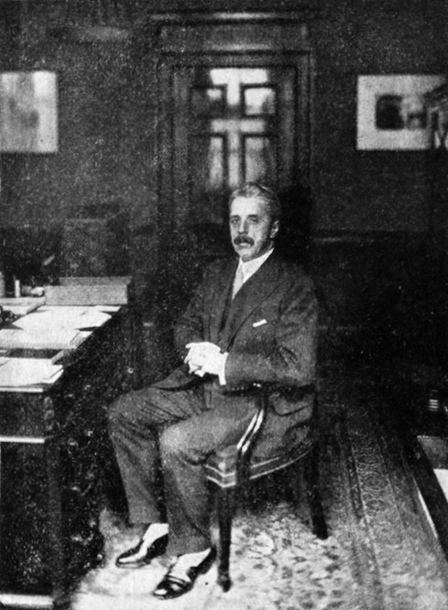
Bennett in 1928

The literary modernists of his day deplored Bennett's books, and those of his well-known contemporaries H. G. Wells and John Galsworthy. Of the three, Bennett drew the most opprobrium from modernists such as Virginia Woolf, Ezra Pound and Wyndham Lewis who regarded him as representative of an outmoded and rival literary culture. There was a strong element of class-consciousness and snobbery in the modernists' attitude: Woolf accused Bennett of having "a shopkeeper's view of literature" and in her essay "Mr Bennett and Mrs Brown" accused Bennett, Galsworthy and Wells of ushering in an "age when character disappeared or was mysteriously engulfed".

In a 1963 study of Bennett, James Hepburn summed up and dissented from the prevailing views of the novels, listing three related evaluative positions taken individually or together by almost all Bennett's critics: that his Five Towns novels are generally superior to his other work, that he and his art declined after The Old Wives' Tale or Clayhanger, and that there is a sharp and clear distinction between the good and bad novels. Hepburn countered that one of the novels most frequently praised by literary critics is Riceyman Steps (1923) set in Clerkenwell, London, and dealing with material imagined rather than observed by the author. (Note: Riceyman Steps won the James Tait Black Memorial Prize for fiction in 1923: winners in other years have included D. H. Lawrence, E. M. Forster, Radclyffe Hall, Aldous Huxley, Graham Greene, Evelyn Waugh, Anthony Powell, Iris Murdoch, John le Carré, Zadie Smith and A. S. Byatt.) On the third point he commented that although received wisdom was that The Old Wives' Tale and Clayhanger are good and Sacred and Profane Love and Lillian are bad, there was little consensus about which other Bennett novels were good, bad or indifferent. He instanced The Pretty Lady (1918), on which critical opinion ranged from "cheap and sensational" ... "sentimental melodrama" to "a great novel". Lucas (2004) considers it "a much underrated study of England during the war years, especially in its sensitive feeling for the destructive frenzy that underlay much apparently good-hearted patriotism".

In 1974 Margaret Drabble published Arnold Bennett, a literary biography. In the foreword she demurred at the critical dismissal of Bennett:

I'd been brought up to believe that even his best books weren't very good – Leavis dismisses him in a sentence or two, and not many people seemed to take him as seriously as I did. The best books I think are very fine indeed, on the highest level, deeply moving, original, and dealing with material that I had never before encountered in fiction, but only in life.

Writing in the 1990s the literary critic John Carey called for a reappraisal of Bennett in his book The Intellectuals and the Masses (1992):

His writings represent a systematic dismemberment of the intellectuals' case against the masses. He has never been popular with intellectuals as a result. Despite Margaret Drabble's forceful advocacy, his novels are still undervalued by literary academics, syllabus-devisers and other official censors.

In 2006 Koenigsberger commented that one reason why Bennett's novels had been sidelined, apart from "the exponents of modernism who recoiled from his democratising aesthetic programme", was his attitude to gender. His books include the pronouncements "the average man has more intellectual power than the average woman" and "women as a sex love to be dominated"; Koenigsberger nevertheless praises Bennett's "sensitive and oft-praised portrayals of female figures in his fiction".

Lucas concludes his study with the comment that Bennett's realism may be limited by his cautious assumption that things are as they are and will not change. Nevertheless, in Lucas's view, successive generations of reader have admired Bennett's best work, and future generations are certain to do so.

=== Crime fiction ===
Bennett dabbled in crime fiction, in The Grand Babylon Hotel and The Loot of Cities (1904). In Queen's Quorum (1951), a survey of crime fiction, Ellery Queen listed the latter among the 100 most important works in the genre. This collection of stories recounts the adventures of a millionaire who commits crimes to achieve his idealistic ends. Although it was "one of his least known works", it was nevertheless "of unusual interest, both as an example of Arnold Bennett's early work and as an early example of dilettante detectivism".

== Legacy ==
=== Arnold Bennett Society ===
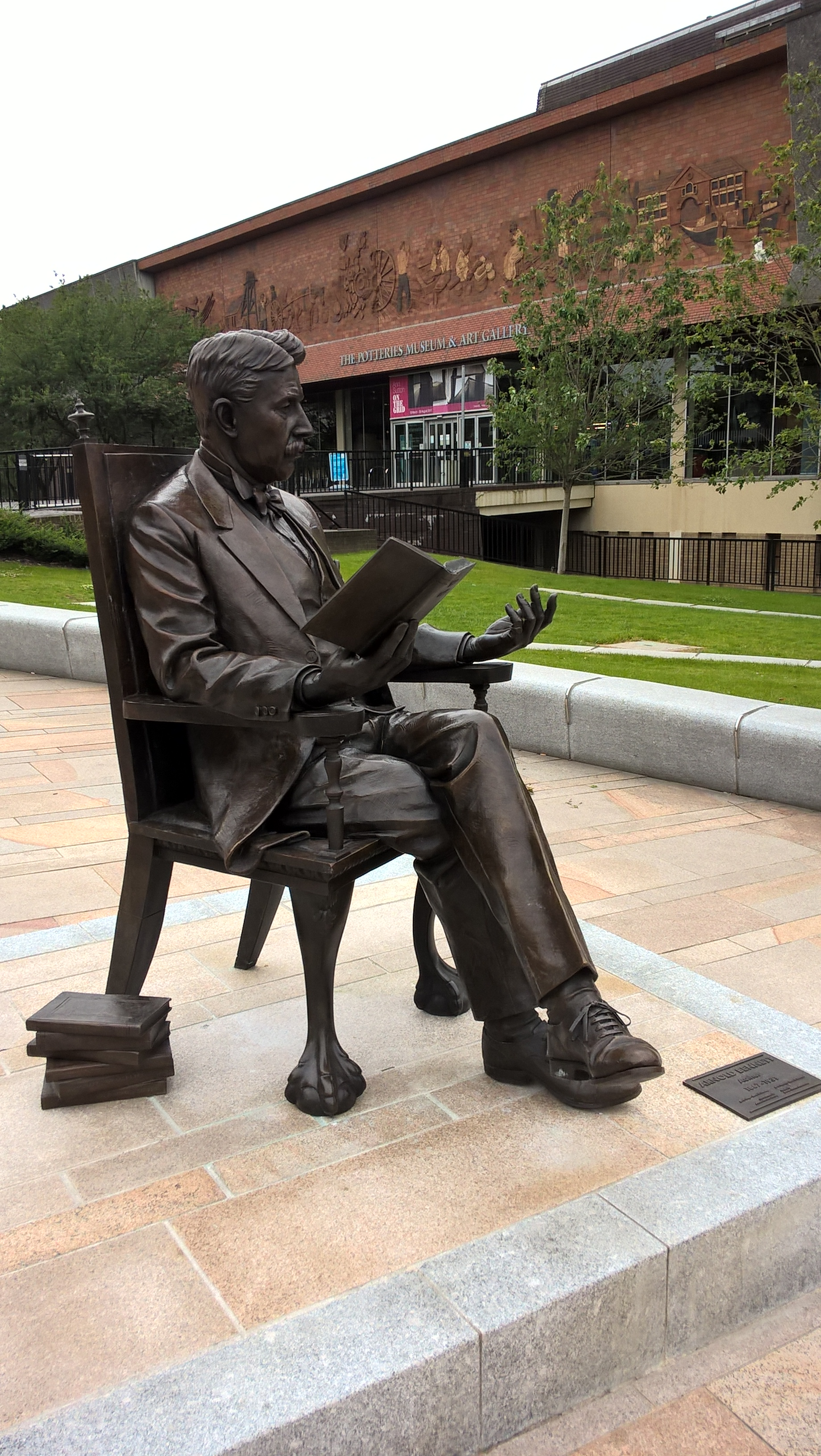
Statue of Bennett outside the Potteries Museum & Art Gallery in Hanley, Stoke-on-Trent

The society was founded in 1954 "to promote the study and appreciation of the life, works and times not only of Arnold Bennett himself but also of other provincial writers, with particular relationship to North Staffordshire." In 2021 its president was Denis Eldin, Bennett's grandson; among the vice presidents was Margaret Drabble.

In 2017 the society instituted an annual Arnold Bennett Prize as part of the author's 150th-anniversary celebrations, to be awarded to an author who was born, lives or works in North Staffordshire and has published a book in the relevant year or to the author of a book which features the region. In 2017 John Lancaster won the award for his poetry collection Potters: A Division of Labour. Subsequent winners have been Jan Edwards for her novel Winter Downs (2018), Charlotte Higgins for Red Thread: On Mazes and Labyrinths (2019) and Lisa Blower for her story collection It's Gone Dark Over Bill's Mother's (2020). The prize was not awarded in 2021 because of the Covid-19 situation, but in 2022 it was won by John Pye, a former detective inspector turned crime writer, for his novel Where the Silent Screams Are Loudest. The prize in 2023 went to Philip Nanney Williams for his book Adams: Britain's Oldest Potting Dynasty. Following this, it was decided to make the prize biennial; in 2025 it was awarded to Jonathan Taylor for his Scablands and Other Stories.

=== Plaques and statuary ===
Bennett has been commemorated by several plaques. Hugh Walpole unveiled one at Comarques in 1931, and in the same year another was placed at Bennett's birthplace in Hanley. A plaque to and bust of Bennett were unveiled in Burslem in 1962, and there are blue plaques commemorating him at the house in Cadogan Square where he lived from 1923 to 1930 and on the house in Cobridge where he lived in his youth. The southern Baker Street entrance of Chiltern Court has a plaque to Bennett on the left and another to H. G. Wells on the right. A blue plaque has been placed on the wall of Bennett's home in Fontainebleau.

There is a two-metre-high bronze statue of Bennett outside The Potteries Museum & Art Gallery in Hanley, Stoke-on-Trent, unveiled on 27 May 2017 during the events marking the 150th anniversary of his birth.

=== Archives ===
There are substantial archives of Bennett's papers and artworks, including drafts, diaries, letters, photographs, and watercolours, at The Potteries Museum & Art Gallery in Stoke-on-Trent and at Keele University. Other Bennett papers are held by University College London, the British Library, Staffordshire University's Special Collections and, in the US, Texas and Yale universities and the Berg Collection in the New York Public Library.

=== Omelette ===
Bennett shares with the composer Gioachino Rossini, the singer Nellie Melba and some other celebrities the distinction of having a well-known dish named in his honour. An omelette Arnold Bennett is one that incorporates smoked haddock, hard cheese (typically Cheddar), and cream. It was created at the Savoy Grill in London for Bennett, who was an habitué, by the chef Jean Baptiste Virlogeux. It remains a British classic; cooks from Marcus Wareing to Delia Smith and Gordon Ramsay have published their recipes for it; it is served at Simpson's in the Strand, adjoining the Savoy, and a variant remains on the menu at the Savoy Grill. (Note: The traditional omelette was served at the Savoy until 2021. In 2022 the omelette was replaced with a soufflé Arnold Bennett, with the same essential ingredients.)

== Notes, references and sources ==
=== Sources ===
- Agate, James (1943) [1942]. Ego 5: Again More of the Autobiography of James Agate. London: Harrap. OCLC 16572017.
- Allen, Walter (1949). Arnold Bennett. London: Home & Van Thal. (The English Novelists series)
- Barker, Dudley (1966). Writer by Trade: A Portrait of Arnold Bennett. New York: Atheneum. OCLC 881792531.
- Bennett, Arnold (1901). Fame and Fiction: An Enquiry into Certain Popularities. New York: Dutton. OCLC 1045233933.
- Bennett, Arnold (1933). Newman Flower (ed.). The Journals of Arnold Bennett: Volume III, 1921–1928. London: Cassels. OCLC 940296443.
- Bennett, Arnold (1954). Frank Swinnerton (ed.). The Journals of Arnold Bennett. London: Penguin. OCLC 476462467.
- Bennett, Arnold (1968). James Hepburn (ed.). Letters of Arnold Bennett: Volume II, 1889–1915. London: Oxford University Press. OCLC 796047600.
- Bennett, Arnold (1974). Andrew Mylett (ed.). Arnold Bennett: The Evening Standard Years – "Books and Persons" 1926–1931. London: Chatto & Windus. ISBN 978-0-70-111851-8.
- Bishop, Edward (1989). A Virginia Woolf Chronology. London: Macmillan. ISBN 978-1-349-07883-7.
- Blum, Beth (2020). The Self-Help Compulsion: Searching for Advice in Modern Literature. New York: Columbia University Press. ISBN 978-0-23-119492-1.
- Carey, John (1992). The Intellectuals and The Masses: Pride and Prejudice among the Literary Intelligentsia, 1880–1939. London: Faber and Faber. OCLC 600877390.
- Corréard, Marie-Hélène; Valerie Grundy; Jean-Benoit Ormal-Grenon; Nicholas Rollin (2007). The Oxford-Hachette French dictionary (fourth ed.). Oxford and New York: Oxford University Press. ISBN 978-0-19-861422-7.
- Donovan, Patrick (2022). Arnold Bennett: Lost Icon. Lewes: Unicorn. ISBN 978-1-914414-47-3.
- Drabble, Margaret (1974). Arnold Bennett. London: Weidenfeld and Nicolson. ISBN 978-0-297-76733-6.
- Gaye, Freda, ed. (1967). Who's Who in the Theatre (fourteenth ed.). London: Sir Isaac Pitman and Sons. OCLC 5997224.
- Hart-Davis, Rupert (1997) [1952]. Hugh Walpole. Stroud: Sutton. ISBN 978-0-7509-1491-8.
- Hepburn, James (1963). The Art of Arnold Bennett. Bloomington: Indiana University Press. OCLC 1147717927.
- Hepburn, James (1970). Letters of Arnold Bennett. Vol. III. London and New York: Oxford University Press. ISBN 0192121855.
- Hepburn, James (2013). Arnold Bennett. London: Routledge. ISBN 978-1-136-20948-2.
- Howarth, Barry (2016). The Craft of Arnold Bennett (PDF) (Thesis). Liverpool: University of Liverpool. OCLC 1063646459. Archived (PDF) from the original on 12 March 2021.
- Jacobs, Arthur (1994). Henry J. Wood: Maker of the Proms. London: Methuen. ISBN 978-0-413-68390-8.
- Lucas, John (1974). Arnold Bennett: A Study of his Fiction. London: Methuen. ISBN 978-0-41-675770-5.
- Lyttelton, George; Rupert Hart-Davis (1979). Rupert Hart-Davis (ed.). The Lyttelton–Hart-Davis Letters, Volume 2. London: John Murray. ISBN 978-0-7195-3673-1.
- Maugham, Somerset (1955). The Vagrant Moment. London and New York: Heinemann and Putnam. OCLC 123753714.
- Pound, Reginald (1953). Arnold Bennett: A Biography. New York: Harcourt, Brace. OCLC 950552766.
- Queen, Ellery (1951). Queen's Quorum. A History of the Detective-Crime Short Story. Boston: Little, Brown. OCLC 504140704.
- Rosen, Carole (1994). The Goossens: A Musical Century. Boston: Northeastern University Press. ISBN 978-1-55-553210-9.
- Steele, Elizabeth (1972). Hugh Walpole. London: Twayne. ISBN 978-0-8057-1560-6.
- Shapcott, John (2015). "Buried Alive: Bennett in the Archives". In John Shapcott (ed.). An Arnold Bennett Companion: A Twenty-first Century Perspective. Leek: Churnet Valley Books. ISBN 978-0-99-288793-3.
- Swinnerton, Frank (1950). Arnold Bennett. London and New York: Longman. OCLC 1148037250.
- Swinnerton, Frank (1954). "Introduction". The Journals of Arnold Bennett. London: Penguin. OCLC 476462467.
- Swinnerton, Frank (1978). Arnold Bennett: A Last Word. New York: Doubleday. ISBN 978-0-38-514545-9.
- Watson, George; Ian R. Willison (1972). The New Cambridge Bibliography of English Literature, Volume 4. Cambridge: Cambridge University Press. ISBN 978-0-521-08535-9.
- Wearing, J. P. (1982). The London Stage, 1910–1916: A Calendar of Plays and Players. Metuchen: Scarecrow. ISBN 978-0-8108-1596-4.
- Young, Kenneth (1975). Arnold Bennett. Harlow: Longman. OCLC 1028222902.
