= The Card =

Comic novel (1911)

- Author: Arnold Bennett
- Language: English
- Genre: Comedy
- Publisher: Methuen & Co.
- Publication date: 1911
- Publication place: United Kingdom
- Media type: Print (hardcover)
- Pages: 305

The Card is a comic novel written by Arnold Bennett in 1911 (entitled Denry the Audacious in the American edition). It was later made into a 1952 movie, starring Alec Guinness.

Like much of Bennett's best work, it is set in the Staffordshire Potteries. It chronicles the rise of Edward Henry ("Denry") Machin from washerwoman's son to Mayor of Bursley (a fictitious town based on Burslem). This is accomplished through luck, initiative and a fair bit of cheek (in slang a card is a 'character', an 'original'; a clever, audacious, person).

Denry Machin returned, as the slightly more mature "Edward Henry", in Bennett's sequel The Regent (1913) (titled The Old Adam in its first US edition).

== Plot ==
The novel begins when "Edward Henry Machin first saw the smoke on May 27, 1867"—the very day of Bennett's own birth. At age 12, Denry begins his career by altering his marks in a test sufficiently to earn him a scholarship to grammar school. At 16, he leaves school to work for Mr Duncalf, the town clerk and a solicitor. Duncalf is responsible for organising an exclusive ball; Denry "invites" himself, then also a few others in exchange for things he will need, such as lessons from dance instructor Ruth Earp. On a bet, he audaciously asks the energetic, beautiful Countess of Chell to dance. Everyone, including Machin, is in awe of the Countess (apparently based on the real-life Duchess of Sutherland) and he thus earns himself the reputation of a "card" (a "character", someone able to set tongues wagging) – a reputation he is determined to cement.

Later, when Duncalf treats a disgruntled client brusquely, Denry leaves his employ after persuading the client to hire him as a rent collector. When some of the tenants fall behind, he begins loaning them money (at a highly profitable interest rate). Ruth herself is several months in arrears and tries to sneak away in the middle of the night. Denry catches her by accident, but rather than being angry, he admires her audacity and starts courting her.

While on holiday at the seaside resort town of Llandudno with Ruth and her friend Nellie Cotterill, he witnesses a shipwreck and the rescue of the sailors. Noting the interest generated, he buys a lifeboat, hires some of the stranded mariners as rowers, and conducts tours of the picturesque wreck. However, Ruth's spendthrift nature becomes alarmingly apparent during the trip and they break up.

By the end of the summer, Denry has made a substantial profit from the sightseers, which he uses to finance his boldest venture. He starts up the Five Towns Universal Thrift Club. Members deposit money little by little; once they have accumulated half the sum they need to purchase whatever it is they want, the club allows them to buy on credit, but only from stores associated with the club. Denry makes money by getting a discount from the vendors in return for access to his large customer base. When his capital starts to run out, he arranges an "accident" for the Countess's coach. He drives conveniently by and gives her a lift to an urgent appointment. On the way there, he talks her into becoming the club's sponsor, ensuring easy financing. This proves to be the making of Denry's fortune.

With his great success, he is appointed a town councillor. He also backs a new daily newspaper (to be bought out at a profit by its established rival anxious to keep its monopoly) and tricks his obstinate mother into moving into a luxurious new house. At this point, Ruth reappears in Denry's life, now the widow of a rich older man. He considers renewing their relationship, but at the last moment, realises that Nellie is the one for him and marries her.

The crowning achievement comes when Denry decides to become the youngest mayor in the history of Bursley. To sway the voters, he purchases the rights to footballer and native son Callear, the "greatest centre forward in England", for the failing Bursley football club.

His antics are regarded with affection and admiration by most others, as shown by the book's final exchange:

"What a card!" said one, laughing joyously. "He's a rare 'un, no mistake."

"Of course, this'll make him more popular than ever," said another. "We've never had a man to touch him for that."

"And yet," demanded Councillor Barlow, "what's he done? Has he ever done a day's work in his life? What great cause is he identified with?"

"He's identified," said the speaker, "with the great cause of cheering us all up."

== Adaptations ==
A film of the novel, The Card (retitled The Promoter for American audiences), adapted by Eric Ambler and directed by Ronald Neame, was released in 1952. It starred Alec Guinness as Denry Machin, Petula Clark as Nellie Cotterill, Valerie Hobson as the Countess, and Glynis Johns as Ruth Earp. The movie was mostly faithful to the novel, though it omitted the newspaper caper, Denry outmanoeuvring his mother into moving, and a few other minor misadventures.

In 1973, the married songwriting team of Tony Hatch and Jackie Trent composed the score for a musical stage version of the same name in London's West End. (The pair wrote a considerable number of Clark's pop hits in the 1960s and '70s.) Although not a huge success, an original cast album was released, and one of the show's tunes, "Nothing Succeeds Like Success", was recorded by Clark as one of her album tracks.

In 1974 Olivia Manning adapted The Card and another of Bennett's works featuring Denry, The Regent (1913) into an eight part BBC Radio play: Denry - The Adventures Of A Card. Graham Armitage portrayed Denry and Ursula O'Leary the Countess of Chell.

In 2007, it was once again adapted as a two-part play for BBC Radio 4. Again, the adaptation was faithful to the novel, with the omission of the newspaper incident.

In 2023, the novel was adapted by Deborah McAndrew into a play. Directed by Conrad Nelson and performed by the Claybody Theatre, the play opened in Fenton, one of Stoke-on-Trent's six towns. The production later moved to Newcastle-under-Lyme's New Vic Theatre.
