= Occupation of Trentham Colliery =

1993 protest in Staffordshire, England

- Date: 12–15 May 1993
- Organized by: North Staffordshire Miners' Wives Action Group
- Participants: Brenda Procter; Bridget Bell; Gina Earl

The occupation of Trentham Colliery, a coal mine in Staffordshire, England, was a protest against its closure which took place from 12 to 15 May 1993. After camping outside the entrance to the Trentham superpit for months, three members of the North Staffordshire Miners' Wives Action Group entered the No. 2 pit shaft in the middle of the night. The women, Brenda Procter, (Note: The correct spelling of her surname is Procter with an "e".) Bridget Bell, and Gina Earl, occupied the pit, chained together on a ledge for 80 hours, while a fourth woman, Rose Hunter, remained outside to manage communications and publicity on their behalf. When the protesters finally agreed to leave, they were led out of the pit by Arthur Scargill, president of the National Union of Mineworkers.

The event became the basis of a documentary musical called Nice Girls, created by Peter Cheeseman, which was staged at the New Victoria Theatre in Stoke-on-Trent and later went on tour in Paris.

== Protest ==
=== 24-hour camp ===
On 11 January 1993, five members of the North Staffordshire Miners' Wives group towed a caravan outside the Trentham pit at Hem Heath and set up camp to protest its closure. Production had stopped at the pit three months prior in October. Once classified as a "superpit", the Trentham Colliery was threatened with permanent closure by British Coal, despite having an estimated 110 million tonnes of coal in reserve.

The caravan had been purchased with £150 raised by the miners' support group in London. The Trentham women's camp was the first of eight round-the-clock camps that were set up outside collieries. Knowing that British Coal was not allowed to tow the caravan as long as there was a person inside, the women took turns to guard it 24 hours a day. The women received strong support from the community. Drivers honked their car horns and cheered as they passed; visitors regularly brought food; and they received letters of support on a daily basis. In contrast to the 1984 miners' strike, public support was more broad-based, with food deliveries from the elderly, from holidaymakers on the canal, and from members of the Sikh community. The Staffordshire County Council supplied the women with a storage cabin, which British Coal tried to remove unsuccessfully.

On 21 April 1993, George Stevenson, Labour MP for Stoke-on-Trent South, stated in the House of Commons that the "cruel" closure of Trentham Colliery was expected to result in the loss of 4,400 jobs, and losses of £84 million in the local economy.

=== Entry into pit and sit-in ===
All four women involved in the occupation had grown up in mining families. They planned their occupation at the Darlaston Inn near Stone in Staffordshire. To work out how to enter the pit without drawing attention, they met with a "mole" who advised them on the best route.

At 2:30 am on 12 May 1993, Brenda Procter, Bridget Bell, and Gina Earl entered the No. 2 pit shaft and chained themselves to the railings of a small ledge only 3 feet (1 m) wide, above a 50-foot (15 m) drop, using motorcycle chains. They were surrounded by machinery with a conveyor belt above their heads.

In response, British Coal management sent security guards to stay with the three women. Routes into different parts of the shaft were sealed off with wood and barbed wire. The women were denied access to water, telephones, or other facilities. When they needed to use the toilet, they wrapped themselves in a sleeping bag and used a plastic bottle with a hole cut into it. They took turns to sleep and were visited by rats. While one or two of the guards tried to help them become more comfortable, the majority taunted the women and made them miserable. Some of the guards were ex-miners who had been brought in from Derby.

Bottled water was finally delivered to the women on the first day, 15 minutes before their first live television interview. On the second day, 60 women arrived, bringing food and hot water flasks, escorted by police and joined by journalists and television camera crews. All together, they sang "Women of the Working Class".

During their sit-in, the women were visited by Health and Safety officers from Stoke Council. Although an environmental health officer arrived bringing chemical toilets to the pit, he was apparently talked out of installing them by the pit manager. The protesters were also visited by Labour MP Joan Walley, who asked them to list their demands. The women asked for blankets, hot water, and toilet facilities, and reiterated their demand that the Trentham superpit be kept open.

On the third day, they were informed by a British Coal representative that they had been instructed to provide the women with one bottle of water, one carton of orange juice, and a sandwich every 12 hours. According to the protesters, however, they received only one delivery of sandwiches. When Rose Hunter arrived to deliver "sanitary equipment" and painkillers to help treat Procter, who was injured, she was turned away by security.

=== Exit from pit ===
Throughout negotiations, British Coal had said they would escort the women out the back of the pit, but the protesters insisted on leaving through the front drive. On the morning of 15 May 1993, National Union of Mineworkers (NUM) president Arthur Scargill brought the occupation to an end when he threatened to march into the pit with 100 demonstrators, unless security guards allowed him to enter the pit to bring the women out.

Procter, Bell, and Earl finally exited the pit and were greeted with tearful cheers from their families and supporters from throughout the Midlands and Northern England. Other groups, such as the Coalmines Support Group of Burton and Derbyshire, had travelled to Trentham pit to show their support for the action. A coach full of pensioners from Liverpool had also travelled to the site, marching around the pit buildings and shouting at the manager's office and at security guards.

=== Aftermath ===
The three women returned to their 24-hour campsite outside the pit, and vowed to continue fighting and take "any action necessary to keep Trentham open". The number of women taking turns to "watch" the campsite grew to nearly 30.

The protesters were congratulated for their "extraordinary courage and determination" during the occupation in a motion tabled in Parliament on 19 May 1993, which was signed by 43 Labour MPs. The motion strongly criticised British Coal's refusal to comply with sections 79 and 80 of the Environmental Protection Act 1990; their poor treatment of the women during their occupation; and the erection of the barbed wire barricade. It also demanded that the government and Board of Trade block British Coal's final decision on closing any of the 10 collieries under threat, until "some form of independent scrutiny" was brought to bear on their review procedure.

On 22 May 1993, Procter, Bell, and Earl led an NUM march, along with Scargill and Tony Benn, MP, protesting the pit closure. On 22 June 1993, the miners' wives ended their six-month vigil outside the pit, towing away their caravan to a secret location. On the last day, more than 50 ex-pitmen and their families gathered at the site, marking the occasion with a barbeque and speeches by the miners' wives and union leaders, who said, "The fight is not over."

== Nice Girls ==
Nice Girls
- Music: Dave Rogers
- Book: Peter Cheeseman
- Basis: Taped interviews about the occupation of Trentham Colliery
- Premiere: 20 October 1993: New Victoria Theatre, Stoke-on-Trent

The 1993 musical Nice Girls was written by Peter Cheeseman as the eleventh in a series of documentary productions he created at New Victoria Theatre in Stoke-on-Trent on "stories of the community". The project was completed within a shorter time frame compared to others in the series, between June and October 1993.

=== Development ===
The script was developed from taped interviews with the women involved in the occupation of Trentham Colliery from 12 to 15 May 1993. The first half focuses on their meticulous planning of the occupation and how they managed to breach security to enter the mine. The second half alternates between the inside of the pit, where Brenda, Bridget, and Gina face hours of anguish, and outside, where Rose coordinates publicity and organises their supporters.

In part due to the limited number of cast members – there were four actresses plus one actor who played all the male parts – the book diverged in emphasis from what the protesters recounted in their interviews. According to an article by Graham Woodruff published in New Theatre Quarterly, the script "softened" the anger, hostility, and "savage fury" the women had expressed toward authorities including the government, the Coal Board, police, and the environmental health officer from the local council, as well as the pit manager, scabs, and security guards who were onsite.

Three songs from the musical included "Promised Land", "And It Goes On", and "The Trentham Occupation", written by Dave Rogers.

=== Production and reception ===
Nice Girls premiered on 20 October 1993 at the New Victoria Theatre in Stoke-on-Trent. A review in the Evening Sentinel said, "buoyed by some rousing songs, studied performances and some sharp humour, it builds towards an exhilarating climax which had the first night audience cheering its approval".

Many reviews in newspapers including the Evening Sentinel and The Independent highlighted the scene where the women go shopping and are embarrassed to be seen at the check-out counter with baskets full of hammers, padlocks, and chains, as particularly "hilarious". Another humorous scene was their "almost farcical attempt" to avoid security, as they weave their way between guards, infrared cameras, and dogs, to the song "Zig Zag".

Arthur Scargill, president of NUM, attended the opening and said, "The acting was superb, it was highly emotional and it reached the audience in a way which is bound to make it a success." Following the first performance, however, audience numbers were lower than anticipated. A spokesperson for the theatre later suggested that low turnout was in part due to the fact that it was staged so soon after the actual event, leading to feelings that the musical was too "political", as well as general fatigue about the topic. Stoke-on-Trent city councillor Barry Milford, a Conservative Party member, criticised the production, calling it "fringe theatre" that had been staged at the expense of more "traditional" family entertainment.

In June 1994, the archive film of Nice Girls was screened at the Theatre Museum in Covent Garden in London. The recording had been made as part of the National Video Archive of Performance. The screening was attended by all four actresses from the musical, as well as the three protesters.

In 1995, the production returned for a limited run at the New Vic Theatre before being staged four times at Theatre 95 in Cergy-Pontoise, France, after being chosen by the Midlands Arts Theatre, Birmingham, to represent the UK in an international arts exchange. Cheeseman reported that in France, the cast had to scramble to get dressed and run back on stage for an unexpected, "thundering" standing ovation.

=== Principal roles and cast ===
The cast members for the 1993 production and the 1995 tour were the same, except for the actress playing Brenda Procter, who was replaced. The original cast members were as follows:

Character	Original cast (1993)
Brenda Procter	Jane Wood
Bridget Bell	Alice Arnold
Gina Earl	Anna Jaskolka
Rose Hunter	Charlotte Barker
All male characters	Steven Granville
