= The People Who Own the Dark =

- Theatrical release poster
- Spanish: Último deseo
- Directed by: León Klimovsky
- Screenplay by: Vicente Aranda; Joaquim Jordà; Gabriel Burgos
- Starring: Nadiuska; Alberto de Mendoza; Teresa Gimpera; Emiliano Redondo; Julia Sali; Tomás Picó; Diana Polakov; Antonio Mayans; Leona Devine; Ricardo Palacios; Maria Perschy; Paul Naschy
- Cinematography: Miguel Fernández Mila
- Edited by: Soledad López
- Music by: Miguel Asins Arbó
- Release date: 1976
- Country: Spain

The People Who Own the Dark (Spanish: Último deseo, lit. 'Last Wish') is a 1976 Spanish post-apocalyptic thriller directed by León Klimovsky starring Nadiuska and Alberto de Mendoza.

== Plot ==
A group of wealthy men who have survived an apocalyptic fallout unscathed mingling with female prostitutes in a high-class orgy in a secluded countryside mansion-brothel face the attacks of a violent horde of blinded townsfolk.

== Cast ==
- Nadiuska
- Alberto de Mendoza as Professor Fulton
- Teresa Gimpera
- Emiliano Redondo
- Julia Sali
- Tomás Picó as Victor
- Diana Polakov
- Antonio Mayans as Vasily
- Leona Devine
- Ricardo Palacios
- Maria Perschy as Lily
- Paul Naschy as Borne

== Production ==
The screenplay was penned by Vicente Aranda, Joaquim Jordà and Gabriel Burgos based on a story by Burgos. Shooting locations included the Cartuja de Talamanca de Jarama in the province of Madrid.

== See also ==
- List of Spanish films of 1976
