= Two Men and Two Women Amongst Them =

- Theatrical film poster
- Spanish: Dos hombres y, en medio, dos mujeres
- Directed by: Rafael Gil
- Written by: José López Rubio; Juan Antonio de Zunzunegui
- Starring: Nadiuska; Alberto Closas; Gemma Cuervo
- Cinematography: José F. Aguayo
- Edited by: José Luis Matesanz
- Music by: Juan José García Caffi
- Release date: 7 March 1977
- Country: Spain
- Language: Spanish

Two Men and Two Women Amongst Them (Spanish: Dos hombres y, en medio, dos mujeres) is a 1977 Spanish drama film directed by Rafael Gil and starring Nadiuska, Alberto Closas and Gemma Cuervo.

== Cast ==
- Nadiuska as María
- Alberto Closas as Martín
- Gemma Cuervo as Carmen
- Alfredo Alba as Ramón
- Mary Begoña
- Susana Mayo
- Juan Santamaría
- Eva Robin
- José Luis Barceló
- Herminia Tejela
- Anastasio de la Fuente
