= The Grand Babylon Hotel =

1902 novel by Arnold Bennett

- Author: Arnold Bennett
- Language: English
- Genre: Fiction
- Publisher: Chatto & Windus
- Publication date: January 1902
- Publication place: United Kingdom
- OCLC: 886640101
- Dewey Decimal: 823'.912

The Grand Babylon Hotel is a novel by Arnold Bennett, published in January 1902, about the mysterious disappearance of a German prince. It originally appeared as a serial in the Golden Penny. The titular Grand Babylon was modelled on the Savoy Hotel which Bennett had much later also used as a model for his 1930 novel Imperial Palace.

In his journal entry on 18 January 1901, Bennett added that his serial was being promoted as the "best thing of this sort" since The Mystery of a Hansom Cab by Fergus Hume.

== Plot introduction ==
The protagonists are an American millionaire, Theodore Racksole, and his daughter Nella (Helen). While staying at the supremely exclusive Grand Babylon Hotel, Nella asks for a steak and Bass beer for dinner, but the order is refused. To get her what she wants Racksole buys the entire hotel, for £400,000 "and a guinea" (so the previous owner, Félix Babylon, can say that he haggled with the multi-millionaire businessman).

Strange things are happening in the hotel. First, Racksole notices the headwaiter, Jules, winking at his daughter's friend, Reginald Dimmock, while they consume their expensive steak. He dismisses the headwaiter. The next day Miss Spencer, the pretty, efficient hotel clerk who has been employed there for years, disappears. It appears that she just took her things and left, no one knows when or where. And Prince Eugen, a prince regnant of Posen, who was to come to the hotel and meet his youthful uncle Prince Aribert (he and the nephew are of the same age), never turns up. Then the body of Dimmock, who was an equerry to the princes, come ahead to prepare for their visit, is found. He was obviously poisoned. And soon after, Dimmock's body disappears.

The same evening the hotel is having a ball in the Gold Room, hosted by a Mr and Mrs Sampson Levi. There is a special secret window though which one can observe the room and the guests. Racksole looks out of it and sees among the guests the dismissed headwaiter, Jules. Racksole runs out to confront him and throw him out, but can't find him. He comes back to the secret window to find Jules, staring intensely into the ball room. Racksole orders him out of the hotel for the second time.

Prince Aribert, who met Nella in Paris while he was travelling incognito under the name of Count Steenbock, confides the whole story to her. He tells her that Prince Eugen never arrived, and no one knows where he is. He was last seen at Ostend. His Majesty the Emperor sent a telegram to Aribert, requesting the whereabouts of Eugen. Aribert, who does not know whether there might be a secret love affair, or an abduction, is facing a dilemma. At last he decides to go to Berlin and state the facts to the Emperor. Nella promises him help and support in London.

After the departure of Aribert, an old lady signs into the hotel under the name of 'Baroness Zerlinski'. Some chance remarks about hotel rooms convinced Nella, who was substituting for the hotel clerk, that it was, in fact Miss Spencer in disguise. When she finds out that Miss Spencer suddenly checks out and departs for Ostend, Nella too goes to Ostend, leaving a short message for her father as to her whereabouts.

In Ostend, Nella follows Miss Spencer into a house, and tries to find out what's going on, threatening the latter with a revolver. Miss Spencer says that she was under orders of Jules, the headwaiter, whose real name is Tom Jackson and who is, she claims, her husband. She says that Jackson/Jules quarrelled with Dimmock and that he had some "money business" with Prince Eugen. She admits that the Prince was a captive in that same house, and she looked after him. He was abducted to prevent him arriving to London, for it would have "upset the scheme". Then Miss Spencer fakes a faint, and Nella, who comes nearer to see if she can help her, is overpowered. Nella loses consciousness.

== Publication history ==
First serialised in Golden Penny in 1901 (of which the relevant issues have not survived), it was then published as a novel by London publisher Chatto & Windus in 1902. An American edition was also published in 1902 by George H. Doran Company in New York, and a Canadian edition in 1902 by Toronto's Bell & Cockburn. A new edition of the novel was published by various publishers in 1904, 1905, 1906, 1910, 1913, 1914, 1920, 1924, 1930, 1932, 1936.

In 1938, Penguin Books added Grand Babylon Hotel to their main series of paperbacks (#176 to be precise). in 1954 & 1972, Penguin did a reprinted version. The 1976 version was part of their Modern Classics line. Their edition of 4 February 1992 was on the Penguin Classics line.

Various editions were published in 1947, 1958 (an abridged version by Longmans, Green & Co.), 1959, 1961, 1967, 1969, 1970, 1971, 1973, 1974, 1975, 1977, 1984 (a large print edition), 1990, 1996.

On 1 September 2001, Project Gutenberg released an e-book version of the novel.

Since the 2000s, the novel has been in and out of print. Academic publisher Broadview Press published a new edition on 3 August 2016 edited by Randi Saloman, an Assistant Teaching Professor at Wake Forest University.

== Reception ==
London-based literature review periodical The Academy had an unsigned review that called the novel a "very amusing story of the feuilleton type". Review had also said that novel was "excellent in the mingling of farce and characterization."

An unsigned review in The Times Literary Supplement notes that Grand Babylon follows a type of subgenre that Anthony Hope had begun with The Prisoner of Zenda and praised Bennett's ability to keep readers interest from the first page to the last.

== Film, radio and stage adaptations ==
In 1916 the novel was adapted into a British film The Grand Babylon Hotel directed by Frank Wilson. In 1920 the title was used by the German filmmaker E.A. Dupont for his thriller The Grand Babylon Hotel. Dupont and Bennett later worked together on the 1929 film Piccadilly.

Chris Harrald adapted the novel for BBC Radio 4 in 2009 in 2 parts with John Sessions as Theodore Racksole and Matti Houghton as Nella Racksole, Stephen Critchlow as Prince Eugen, Fenella Woolgar as Miss Spencer and Joe Kloska as Aribert.

Xavier Mauméjean adapted Lise Capitan's French language translation for Radio France Culture (Samedi Noir programme).

In 2025, Deborah McAndrew and Conrad Nelson, of the Claybody Theatre company, wrote a stage script based on the novel. They went on to produce and direct the play at Newcastle-under-Lyme's New Vic Theatre in September 2025, with 15 characters played by four actors. The production garnered many positive reviews.
