= Charlotte Barker =

British actress (born 1962)

- Born: 1962 (age 63–64); Willesden, Middlesex, England
- Occupation: Actress
- Parent: Ronnie Barker

Charlotte Barker (born 1962) is a British actress, best known for Stepping Out and Nice Girls.

== Early life and education ==
Barker was born in Wembley, the second of three children and only daughter of comedian Ronnie Barker and his wife Joy. The family moved to Pinner when she was two. Barker attended St Helen's School, Northwood, and studied drama at the Studio School of Speech and Drama, Pinner. Aged 16, she was selected to attend the Royal National Theatre Youth Theatre Workshop. Her family lived in Australia for a year when she left school, and she studied American method acting at the Ensemble Studios acting school in Sydney, Australia. On her return to London, she studied at the Guildhall School of Music and Drama.

== Career ==
=== Theatre ===
Barker made her West End debut in Richard Harris's Stepping Out, at the Duke of York's Theatre in September 1984; the play received the Evening Standard Theatre Award for Best Comedy in 1984. In 1988, Barker received the Lloyd Award for "Best Newcomer" from critic Kevin Lloyd of The Derby Express for her performances at the Derby Playhouse. Lloyd wrote that she had "charmed and impressed" in three contrasting performances in The Innocent Mistress, The Scatterbrained Scarecrow of Oz, and The Children's Hour.

Other plays she appeared in at the Derby Playhouse, under the direction of Annie Castledine, included Tokens of Affection by Maureen Lawrence (1990), in which Barker played the central role of Debbie. Critic Kevin Lloyd commented "Miss Barker is obviously an actress of the very highest calibre. Her portrayal is utterly convincing and downright nasty. She makes no concessions. And our delight when the bully is beaten to the ground and made to beg for her forgiveness is a measure of her brilliance."

Barker later appeared as Hobby and other characters in Teechers at the Gateway Theatre, Chester in 1991; as Kate in Alan Ayckbourn's Bedroom Farce at the New Victoria Theatre in Newcastle in 1995; as Homily in an adaptation of The Borrowers at the Birmingham Old Rep in 1995; as Amelia in A Little Princess at the Manchester Library Theatre in 1996; and in Love Me Slender by Vanessa Brooks at the Oldham Coliseum Theatre in 2002, directed by Janys Chambers.

In 1993 and again in 1995, Barker played Rose Hunter in Nice Girls, a documentary drama created by the New Victoria Theatre about four miners' wives protesting against pit closures by occupying a shaft at Trentham Colliery. Arthur Scargill was present at the first performance in 1993, and declared "This is an outstanding play. The acting was superb". An archive recording of a performance in November 1993 was made by the Theatre Museum. A reviewer in The Stage wrote "The New Victoria Theatre revival of Nice Girls has inexplicably transformed it into a masterpiece of documentary drama ... [with] superlatively natural performances from a cast whose varied characters dovetail into a marvellous dramatic unit." The company also gave four performances of the 1995 revival of Nice Girls in France, at Cergy-Pontoise, where they received a standing ovation.

In 1998, Barker appeared in the play Mum, which was written for her by her father. The Stage editor and critic Peter Hepple described Mum as "a bleak little play ... largely a monologue about loneliness ... But Charlotte Barker makes Alison a very real character as she sorts through the family mementoes which recall her generally unexciting life." Nick Curtis of the Evening Standard, however, said that "it reveals Barker senior ... to be a very poor playwright, and it neither stretches nor flatters Barker junior." Writing in the Daily Telegraph, critic Charles Spencer described the play as "a theatrical hell of sentimentality and squirming embarrassment", but continued, "Charlotte Barker is in no way to blame for this. She has a scrubbed, honest and expressive face, a strong stage presence and a gift for pathos. If anything good is to come out of this misguided production it is that she will promptly be signed up to play Sonya in Uncle Vanya, a role in which she would undoubtedly excel."

=== Television ===
Her television debut came in 1984 as Miss Turner in one episode of Fresh Fields; she appeared in the same role in two more episodes in 1985. The same year, she appeared in an episode of the television sitcom Open All Hours (with her father). She then appeared in the BBC Screen Two film Frankie and Johnnie in 1986, and in 1987 played Gillian in the film Wish You Were Here, and Bridget Sotheby in Agatha Christie's Miss Marple: At Bertram's Hotel. Other parts came in The Widowmaker (1990); Carla Lane's Screaming (1992; 6 episodes); the crime series Maigret (1992); The Bill (1996); Birds of a Feather (1998); and Hearts and Bones (2001).
