= Esperanza Lemos =

Spanish actress

- Born: Spain
- Parent(s): Rosa Fontana (a daughter of Avelino Sevilla) Carlos Manuel Lemos (a son of Carlos Lemos)

Esperanza Lemos (born as Esperanza Lemos Sevilla in Spain) is a Spanish actress, who mostly appears in the theatre, but she also had roles in TV series.

== Filmography ==
- La mujer de tu vida 2 (1994)
- MIR (2007)
- Cuéntame cómo pasó (2007) — A sick woman
- Con pelos en la lengua (2009)
- El abrigo (2013)
- La ley del embudo (2018) — Vanesa López

== Family ==
Esperanza is a daughter of the actress Rosa Fontana (Rosa Engracia Sevilla Plo) – the daughter of the poet Avelino Sevilla Hernández and his wife – and her second husband, Carlos Manuel Lemos (son of the actor Carlos Lemos).
