= Deborah McAndrew =

British playwright and actor (born 1967)

Deborah McAndrew (born 1967) is a British playwright and actor, known for playing Angie Freeman in Coronation Street in the 1990s. She is co-founder and Creative Director of the Stoke-on-Trent-based Claybody Theatre Company, and a visiting lecturer in the Department of Drama and Theatre Arts at Staffordshire University.

== Early life and education ==
McAndrew was born in Huddersfield, West Riding of Yorkshire, and later moved to Ossett and then Leeds. She had two younger sisters. She had always wanted to write plays; the family regularly holidayed with another family with four children, giving her a cast of seven.

She studied drama at the University of Manchester and a PGCE in Drama and Special Education at Bretton Hall College of Education.

== Acting career ==
McAndrew joined the cast of the long-lived Granada television soap Coronation Street for four years across two periods in the 1990s, playing young designer Angie Freeman. She has appeared in theatre, radio and television including the BBC Radio 4 detective series Stone, as Lily Gaskell in the 2013 BBC Radio 4 Extra radio adaptation of Elizabeth Gaskell's Wives and Daughters, and as Mrs. Dashwood in Helen Edmundson's 2013 Radio 4 adaptation of Jane Austen's Sense and Sensibility. She first joined Northern Broadsides as an actor in 1995.

== Playwriting career ==
In 2004 McAndrew adapted Leopold Lewis's 1871 play The Bells for Northern Broadsides. Since then her adaptations have included Dario Fo's Accidental Death of an Anarchist, Nikolai Gogol's The Government Inspector, and Nikolai Erdman's The Suicide under the new title The Grand Gesture.

Her first original script was Vacuum (2006, set in a vacuum cleaner repair shop) which was performed by Northern Broadsides. She wrote Flamingoland, about a woman with breast cancer, in 2008, for the New Vic Theatre in Newcastle-under-Lyme, and in 2013 she wrote Ugly Duck, set among the Staffordshire pottery trade, for the Claybody Theatre Company which she co-founded in that area.

Her 2014 play An August Bank Holiday Lark, a Northern Broadsides co-production with the New Vic Theatre, won that year's UK Best New Play award from the UK Theatre awards for regional theatre. Set in Saddleworth at the start of World War I, it features the village's traditional rushbearing procession and morris dancing.

McAndrew has written several plays for the Mikron Theatre Company, a touring company which in summer travels by canal boat. These include Losing the Plot (2012, set amongst allotment gardeners), Beyond the Veil (2013, allotments again, beekeeping and murder), Till the Cows Come Home (2014, on ice cream making), and One of Each (2015, concerning fish and chips).

Her play Dirty Laundry, a mystery set in a small house in the heart of Stoke-on-Trent, was performed in the old Spode factory in October 2017. Featuring a cast of professional actors accompanied by the community cast of the Claybody Theatre Company, Dirty Laundry received excellent reviews.

Her 2017/2018 adaptation of Charles Dickens' A Christmas Carol gained good reviews at the Hull Truck Theatre in Hull, East Yorkshire.

In 2025 she adapted Arnold Bennett's The Grand Babylon Hotel into a play in which four actors played 15 parts, which was produced at the New Vic Theatre in Newcastle-under-Lyme.

== Chancellor of Leeds Trinity University ==
In April 2018, McAndrew was announced as Leeds Trinity University's new Chancellor, replacing Gabby Logan. She was installed as Chancellor in a ceremony at the University Chapel on 15 June 2018.

== Personal life ==
McAndrew is married to Conrad Nelson, actor, musician, former Musical Director of Northern Broadsides, and currently a director at the Stoke-on-Trent-based Claybody Theatre Company. They have a daughter.
