= Ninja Over the Great Wall =

1987 Hong Kong film by Bruce Le and Kim Hui-lim

- Directed by: Bruce Le; Kim Hui-lim
- Written by: Fock Da-lin
- Starring: Bruce Le; Lily Young; Shi Kamura; Li Ning
- Cinematography: Yue Ke; Chen Sing-hoi
- Distributed by: Esplanade Filmverleih (West Germany)
- Release date: 8 May 1987 (Hong Kong)
- Running time: 82 minutes
- Country: Hong Kong
- Language: Cantonese

Ninja Over the Great Wall (Long hyo chang cheng), also known as Fire on the Great Wall and Shaolin Fist of Fury, is a 1987 martial arts film starring Bruce Lee clone, Bruce Le.

The Region 1 DVD from Ground Zero Entertainment is retitled Shaolin Fist of Fury. The box claims that Hwang Jang-Lee is in the film, but he is not. Most sources list this as a 1987 film, although the Hong Kong Movie DataBase gives the year as being 1990.

== Plot ==
The film takes place during the 1930s, during Japanese occupation of China. Chi Keung's (Bruce Le) mother is killed during the occupation. Chi himself is presumed dead, but is later saved by his friend Yip.

They travel to Beijing, where Yip stays with his aunt along with Chi. Unfortunately, a Japanese fighter, Shojiro, comes to town with the intent of showing off his martial arts expertise by brawling with Chi's master. The master wins the fight, but Shojiro's father has the master killed. An angry Chi punches and kicks his way to Shojiro, and finds that Shojiro did not want the master to die; the murder was merely a way for his father to save face. Chi spares Shojiro and requests that he never steps foot in China gain. This agreement only temporarily lasted, causing Shojiro (trained in the ways of Bushido) and Chi (trained in kung fu) to meet for one final confrontation on the Great Wall of China.

== Reception ==
On the website Bruceploitation, "Keith" writes:

"While liberally borrowing from the Bruce Lee classic Fist of Fury, this Bruce Le vehicle is still quite entertaining. The fight scenes are lots of fun with Bruce taking on hordes of ninjas literally everywhere. Viewers should get a kick out of a scene where Bruce fights a ninja who is on fire. Talk about having control of your mind and body. Also, there is the requisite "You killed my teacher" Japanese dojo attack required by Bruceploitation Law. The end fight scene (shot on location at the Great Wall) is mighty impressive and brutal. What surprised me the most about this film is the pessimistic storyline. Pretty much everyone dies. Using the Japanese occupation of China as a backdrop, the filmmakers also inject a bit of political commentary (not saying the Fist of Fury was subtle though). If only Bruce Le had made more movies like this."

The review on Kung Fu Cinema by Rudolph Pretorius:

"The film’s major flaw lies in the fact that it’s played straight-faced throughout. No intentional jokes are to be found. Some humor could definitely have helped. The film is relatively new in terms of genre, yet it uses the same old story about the Chinese versus the Japanese...There’s not much about the film to recommend even if you like these Chinese versus the Japanese plots. The production values aren’t bad, but they should rather have employed better actors than have good-looking sets and locations. Stay away!"

== Trivia ==
The film's final fight can be briefly seen in Ang Lee's directorial debut film Pushing Hands (1991).
