= Sally Farmiloe =

British actress (1948–2014)

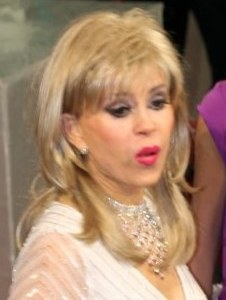
- Farmiloe in 2013
- Born: 14 July 1948; Reading, Berkshire, England
- Died: 28 July 2014 (aged 66)
- Occupation: Actress
- Spouse: Jeremy Neville (m. 2002)
- Children: 2 daughters

Sarah Farmiloe (14 July 1948 – 28 July 2014) was a British actress, best known for Howard's Way. She appeared as Dawn Williams in the first and second series.

She was the daughter of Tom Farmiloe, a well-to-do farmer and yacht-broker, and his wife Pam. Sally Farmiloe had a daughter, Jade, in 1992 by Jeremy Neville; the couple split when she was pregnant. Farmiloe garnered considerable tabloid coverage for her affair with the politician Lord Archer from 1996 to 1999. She reunited with Neville and married him in 2002. She adopted her best friend's daughter, Kat, after the friend's death.

Farmiloe was diagnosed with breast cancer in 2012. She died two years later after the cancer had metastasised to her bones and liver.

== Select filmography ==
- Spanish Fly (1975)
- Spectre (1977)
- Bergerac (television series, 1981)
- Howards' Way (television series, 1985–86)
- The Two Mrs. Grenvilles (television movie, 1987; uncredited)
