= Stephen Joseph Studio =

Former church in United Kingdom

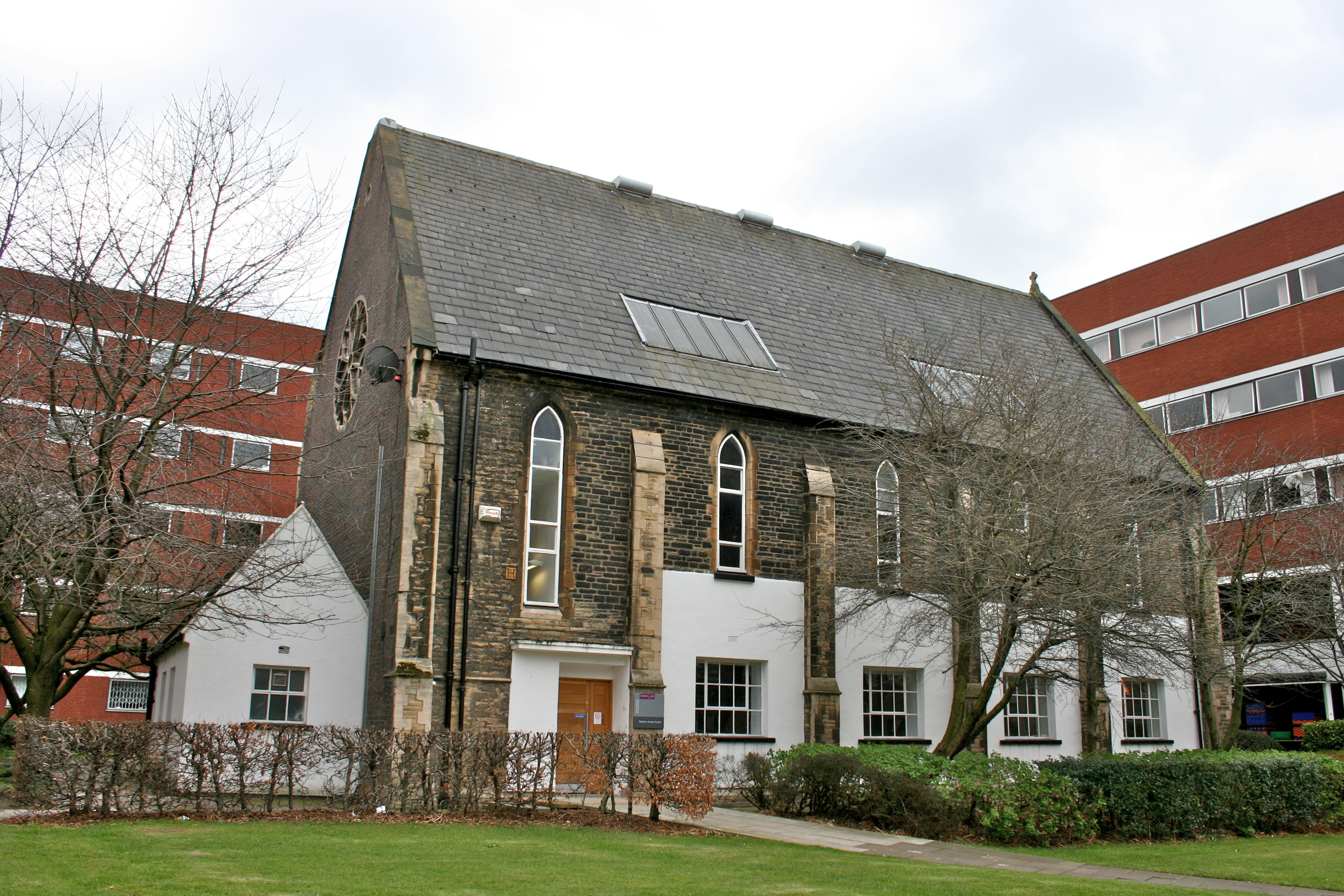
- Interactive map of the Stephen Joseph Studio area
- Former names: German Protestant Church, Greenheys

General information
- Architectural style: Neo-Gothic
- Location: Chorlton on Medlock
- Coordinates: 53°27′49.46″N 2°14′3.73″W
- Construction started: 1871 (?)
- Completed: Prior to 1895
- Owner: University of Manchester

The Stephen Joseph Studio is a former German Protestant Church, now part of the University of Manchester, in Greenheys, Manchester, England. It used to lie on Wright Street (off Ducie Street), a street which no longer exists (grid reference SJ845963). It was mentioned in the Manchester Directory for 1858, with the pastor's name H. E. Marotsky (Hermann Eduard Marotsky); it should not be confused with the German Church in John Dalton Street, established by Joseph Steinthal in 1854. It was first occupied by the university in 1949 and had various uses before its use by the Department of Drama.

The main entrance lies on the west side of the building, with a side entrance on the north. The east side features a rose window. The building houses seven lecture rooms, with space for up to 179 students. It is named after Stephen Joseph, the pioneer of theatre in the round. Since the late 1970s the Mansfield Cooper Building has stood to the south-west.

== Sources ==
- Coates, Su (=S. D. F. Thomas) (1991) "Manchester's German Gentlemen ... 1840-1920" in: Manchester Region History Review, vol. 5, no. 2, 1991/2; pp. 24
- Williams, Bill (1976) The Making of Manchester Jewry, 1740-1875. Manchester: U. P. ISBN 0-8419-0252-6; p. 334
