= Spanish Fly (1975 film) =

1975 British film

- Directed by: Bob Kellett
- Written by: Peter James; José Luis Martínez Mollá; Robert Ryerson
- Produced by: Gerald Flint-Shipman; Peter James
- Starring: Leslie Phillips; Terry-Thomas; Graham Armitage; Nadiuska; Sue Lloyd
- Music by: Ron Goodwin
- Production companies: Winkle Productions; Quadrant Films; Izaro Films
- Distributed by: EMI Films
- Release date: 11 January 1976
- Running time: 86 minutes
- Countries: United Kingdom; Spain
- Language: English
- Budget: £250,000

Spanish Fly is a 1975 British-Spanish comedy film directed by Bob Kellett and starring Leslie Phillips, Terry-Thomas, Graham Armitage, Sue Lloyd and Nadiuska. It was written by Peter James, José Luis Martínez Mollá and Robert Ryerson.

== Plot ==
Mike Scott, an impotent British fashion designer, heads out to Spain for a photo shoot and encounters an old school rival, Sir Percy de Courcy, who has inadvertently added an aphrodisiac to the local wine.

== Cast ==
- Leslie Phillips as Mike Scott
- Terry-Thomas as Sir Percy de Courcy
- Graham Armitage as Perkins
- Nadiuska as Julie
- Sue Lloyd as Janet Scott
- Frank Thornton as Doctor Johnson
- Ramiro Oliveros as Juan
- Andrea Allan as Bruce
- Sally Farmiloe as Francesca
- Jaleh Haddah as Annette
- Nina Francis as Isabel
- Sergio Mendizábal as Pons Prades
- Emiliano Redondo as Clean Domingo
- Fernando Villena as Dirty Domingo
- Marisa Porcel as Maria
- José Lifante as Pedro

== Production ==
=== Development ===
Impact-Quadrant Films was a company run by Peter James and Kent Walwin which specialised in financing and distributing horror films. They wanted to move into the British domestic sex comedy market, having noticed that there were no challengers to the Carry On Films. The company made a small investment in Can You Keep It Up for a Week? (1974) which was successful, and they began to look at making a whole feature.

A Canadian distributor had enjoyed success with a Leslie Phillips film and asked if they could have another. Phillips was about to go to Australia for a year so they had a script written quickly, about an escort agency. Nobody liked it so James and Walwin wrote a 110-page treatment over "a long weekend" which was turned into a script by a writer.

The film's budget was £250,000, of which 40% was provided by EMI Films and 8% by a Spanish company. The majority capital was split between James, his associate and four English backers, one of them a lawyer. In July 1975 EMI Films announced its involvement in the movie as part of a six-picture slate, which also included Evil Under the Sun (1982), Aces High (1976) and cinema adaptations of TV shows – The Likely Lads (1976) and Sweeney! (1977). Another account said this was an eleven picture slate with other movies including Seven Nights in Japan (1970), Cross of Iron (1977) and It Shouldn't Happen to a Vet (1976).

Leslie Phillips wrote in his memoir that he was offered the role over the phone while in Australia by director Bob Kellett. Phillips accepted before reading the script – while he said the title was "not exactly inspiring" he was friends with Terry-Thomas, who was going to co-star, and the idea of filming in Spain was attractive.

=== Shooting ===
Filming started July 1975. The movie was shot in Menorca. According to director Bob Kellett, Phillips "had cut short the run of his play" in Australia to make the movie. When the actor arrived in Spain, Kellet says Phillips found "much to his dismay, that there wasn’t a script and he was a little bit indignant about the whole thing. I think it was an exercise in how not to make a movie — it was decided by the powers that be that they didn’t need a script. They thought they had enough good ideas around to be able to make a funny film without a script."

Phillips admitted that after he arrived in Spain, "It soon became clear that there was something not quite right about the whole set-up. Terry didn't seem at all well, and the movie, Spanish Fly, seemed to have been cobbled together a little too loosely. But a job's a job." Phillips said it was not an easy shoot because Terry Thomas was showing signs of illness. "Early-morning conversation, before make-up, was non-existent; he was disoriented and shaky – not a bit like the normal Terry," wrote Phillips. It turned out Terry-Thomas was suffering from the effects of Parkinson's disease.

James wanted to make a sequel French Kiss but none eventuated.

The film featured designs from Peter Reger.

== Release ==
The film was released with a heavy advertising campaign, including a novelisation of the script, a song "Fly Me" (because the BBC would not play a song called "Spanish Fly"). Screening rights to the film were sold to 25 countries, something James attributed to the fact that unlike many British sex comedies it featured foreign locations.

== Reception ==
In the Monthly Film Bulletin David McGillivray wrote: "Produced on a slightly higher budget than most of its ilk, Spanish Fly is at least attractive to look at. But apart from the moderate amusement to be had from Terry-Thomas being Terry-Thomas, it is a weak excuse for a comedy, boasting all the ingredients (lecherous underwear salesman has fun in hotel bedrooms) but none of the cuisine. The finale, in which the cast runs around barking at each other, would have seemed banal even in the tattiest children's film"

Barry Norman in The Observer called it the least funny British funny film ever made.

Gerald Pratley wrote in A Century of Canadian Cinema: "Two popular British comedians, Thomas and Phillips, are all but lost trying to make funny this feeble jaunt to Minorca to photograph scantily dressed models among other antics. Almost nothing about this is Canadian except the producers applying for their tax benefits."

Radio Times reviewer Jeremy Aspinall described the film as a "curio from the 1970s" which "looks awfully dated now. However, the stars still manage to exhibit consummate charm and professionalism despite the bawdy nonsense going on around them."

Time Out wrote: "Dire comedy which doubles as a series of plugs for an underwear company."

== Notes ==
- Phillips, Leslie (2006). Hello : the autobiography.
- McCann, Graham (2009). Bounder! : the biography of Terry-Thomas. p. 164-167.
