= Conrad Nelson =

British actor, composer and musical director

Conrad Nelson (born 1963) is a British actor, composer and musical director, and he was the Artistic Director of the Northern Broadsides company until 2019.

His acting roles have included Iago in the Northern Broadsides production of Othello when Lenny Henry played the lead, and Leontes in the company's 2015 The Winter's Tale which he also directed.

In 2013, he appeared as Sir John Middleton in Helen Edmundson's BBC Radio 4 adaptation of Sense and Sensibility.

Nelson and his family now live in Newcastle-under-Lyme, where he is one of the dramatic directors at the New Vic Theatre where his latest production was of the musical farce One Man, Two Guvnors. He is also artistic director at the Claybody Theatre, a Stoke on Trent drama group that specialises in local themes, including Arnold Bennett's The Card and The Grand Babylon Hotel.

== Personal life ==
Nelson is married to playwright and actor Deborah McAndrew. They have a daughter named Elizabeth
