= Graham Armitage =

English actor (1936–1999)

- Armitage in The Avengers: Quick-Quick Slow Death (1966)
- Born: Edgar Harvey Armitage; 24 April 1936; Blackpool, Lancashire, England
- Died: 6 March 1999 (aged 62); Johannesburg, South Africa
- Education: Royal Academy of Dramatic Art (RADA)
- Occupation: Actor
- Years active: 1952–1999 (Film and TV)
- Spouse: Carole England (m. 1955)
- Children: 3

Graham Armitage (24 April 1936 – 6 March 1999) was an English stage, film and television actor. From 1973 he lived and worked in South Africa, where he had spent part of his childhood.

== Early life and education ==
Edgar Harvey Armitage was born on 24 April 1936 in Blackpool in Lancashire, the son of Albert Edward Armitage (1908–1959) and Isabel W. née Bailes (1909–). In 1947 Armitage left the UK with his family, flying to South Africa and eventually settling in Cape Town where he attended Sea Point High School and then the Christian Brothers College. In early 1951 Armitage and his family moved to Salisbury, in Southern Rhodesia where he attended Prince Edward School.

During 1952 Harvey wrote the entrance exam for late entry to Dartmouth Naval College. Whilst his Maths and Geography results were outstanding he had not studied the same syllabus for English Literature and History so failed to obtain entrance.

He graduated from Royal Academy of Dramatic Art (RADA) in 1952, following which he made his début in the BBC television play Without The Prince, which was transmitted live.

== Career ==
For the next twenty years Armitage regularly appeared on screen, mainly on television. He had roles in such shows as The Saint, The Avengers and made several appearances on The Dick Emery Show. In 1973 Armitage went to South Africa to appear in the Noël Coward revue Cowardy Custard and decided to stay there, becoming a familiar face on local television and stage.

In 1974 Olivia Manning adapted two of Arnold Bennett's works (The Card and The Regent) into an eight-part BBC Radio play: Denry - The Adventures Of A Card. Armitage played Denry, with Ursula O'Leary as the Countess of Chell. From 1979 to 1985 he portrayed Sherlock Holmes for Springbok Radio. His last appearance was in 1999 as a vicar in the South African family film Alec to the Rescue.

== Personal life ==
In 1955 he married Carole Shirley England (1934–2017) at the Cathedral of St Mary and All Saints in Salisbury, Southern Rhodesia, then part of the Federation of Rhodesia and Nyasaland. The couple had three children.

Armitage died in Johannesburg in South Africa in 1999.

== Selected filmography ==
=== Film ===
- The Spy Who Came in from the Cold (1965) - Pawson (uncredited)
- The Fiction-Makers (1968) - Carson
- Battle of Britain (1969) - Radar Officer (uncredited)
- The Fifth Day of Peace (1970) - Mark
- The Private Life of Sherlock Holmes (1970) - Wiggins (uncredited)
- Scrooge (1970) - Party Guest (uncredited)
- The Music Lovers (1970) - Prince Balukin
- Games That Lovers Play (1971) - Mr. Adams
- The Devils (1971) - Louis XIII
- The Boy Friend (1971) - Michael
- Take Me High (1973) - Boardman
- The New Spartans (1975)
- Spanish Fly (1975) - Perkins
- Zulu Dawn (1979) - Capt. Shepstone (uncredited)
- Game for Vultures (1979) - Harken
- Flashpoint Africa (1980) - Don
- The Gods Must Be Crazy (1980) - The Reverend (voice, uncredited)
- Die Groen Faktor (1984) - William Honiball
- Wie Laaste Lag... (1986) - Heart attack businessman
- Going Bananas (1987) - Gen. Smythe-Paget
- Jane and the Lost City (1987) - Cake Waiter
- Code Name Vengeance (1987) - Forrest (uncredited)
- Diamonds High (1988) - Bank manager
- Merchants of War (1989) - Gordon
- Circles in a Forest (1989) - Commissioner
- That Englishwoman: An Account of the Life of Emily Hobhouse (1990) - Minister
- Oddball Hall (1990) - The Grand Noble Master
- River of Diamonds (1991) - Judge
- Fei zhou he shang (1991) - Auctioneer
- Sweet 'n Short (1991) - Bryce Williams
- Fleshtone (1994) - Dr. Sydney Frye
- Cry, the Beloved Country (1995) - Judge
- Alec to the Rescue (1999) - Vicar (final film role)

=== Television ===
- Theatre 625 (1966) - Monsieur Bernard
- The Avengers (1966-1967) - Algernon 'Algy' Wynche / Huggins
- Doctor Who (1967) - Barney
- The Saint (1968) - Carson
- The First Churchills (1969) - Earl of Rochester
- Randall and Hopkirk (1970) - Young Stage Director
- From a Bird's Eye View (1971) - Johnstone
- Seven of One (1973) - Arthur (Episode "My Old Man")
- The Naked Civil Servant (1975) - Mr. Dunsmore
- Open All Hours (1976) - Man from Matlock Mutual Protection Society

== Bibliography ==
- Ross, Robert. The Complete Terry-Thomas. Reynolds & Hearn, 2002.
