= Bruce and the Shaolin Bronzemen =

- Directed by: Joseph Kong
- Written by: Joseph Kong
- Produced by: Robert Jeffrey
- Starring: Bruce Le
- Release date: December 1, 1977
- Running time: 88 mins.
- Countries: Hong Kong; Philippines
- Languages: Mandarin; Cantonese; Tagalog

Bruce and the Shaolin Bronzemen (Chinese: 神龙猛虎, Hanyu Pinyin: Shén lóng měng hǔ, lit. "Dragon and Tiger") is a 1977 Hong-Kong martial arts movie, of the 'Bruceploitation' movement starring the famous Bruce Lee impersonator Bruce Le.

The film also goes by the titles King Boxer 2 (video title, United Kingdom), and Enter the Game of Shaolin Bronzemen (DVD title, United States).

== Plot ==
The film is about Wang Liu, a martial artist who is sent by his master to the Philippines to deliver half a silver coin to his uncle, he gets to his destination to find his uncle has been shot. Wang finds out that when the other half of the coin is connected it reveals the whereabouts of treasure his uncle buried for the Japanese army. But the second half of the silver coin belongs to the daughter of a man known as Mr Ramos, but their whereabouts is unknown. After burying his uncle Wang tries to find Mr Ramos' daughter, who we know is called Mina. While he is doing this two assassins kidnap Mr Santos' daughter. While in capture Mina appears for the first time but is soon also captured. When Wang comes home he finds Mr Santos' daughter is missing. While trying to find her he is also captured by the assassins. They escape and Mina gives Wang the second half of the silver coin, the coin tells them that the treasure is buried in a park near their house. They all go and dig up the treasure to find the box is empty. While Wang searches to find who is behind this Mina and Mr Santos' daughter are re-captured, Meanwhile, Wang finds that a woman is spying on him to find the whereabouts of the treasure. Two of her assassins then kill Mina and Mr Santos' daughter. Wang discovers this and vows revenge, he finds the woman spying on him is called Mrs Misuke. He fights her and she throws a poison dart at his chest, Wang takes the dart and throws it into her eye. As the opening credits role we see both Wang and Mrs Misuke die together.

== Cast ==
- Wang Liu - Bruce Le
- Mrs Misuke - Lita Vasques

== Reception ==
The film is generally considered one of Bruce Le's worst movies. Joseph Kuby of City on Fire gave the film 5.5/10 and said: "On the whole, this film is worth checking out if you’re looking for a film that’s out of this world. It’s not the worst Bruceploitation movie but nowhere near the best, not by a long shot."
