= Rosa Fontana =

Spanish actress

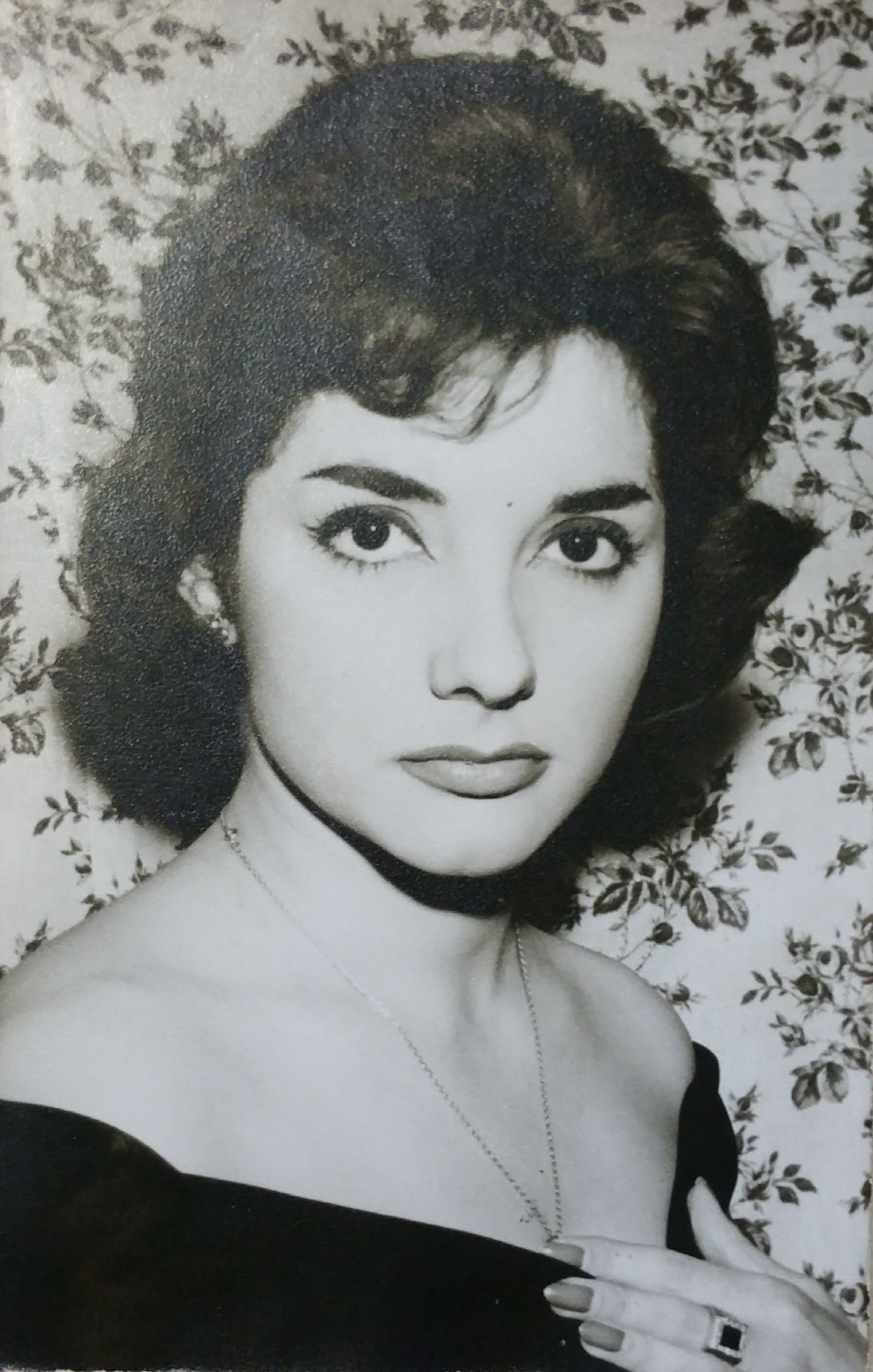
- Born: Rosa Engracia Sevilla Plo; January 21, 1938 (age 88); Zaragoza
- Children: Esperanza Lemos
- Parent: Avelino Sevilla Hernández

Rosa Fontana is a Spanish actress, who was born as Rosa Engracia Sevilla Plo on January 21, 1938 in Zaragoza. She appeared in many Spanish films and TV series, and she also worked in theatre.

== Filmography ==
=== Films ===
- ¡Se armó el belén! – Maruji
- Vente a Alemania, Pepe
- Hay que educar a papá
- Las tres perfectas casadas
- Nothing Less Than a Real Man
- Celos, amor y mercado común
- Cinco almohadas para una noche
- Crónica del alba. Valentina
- Lala – Lucía

=== TV series ===
- Ni pobre ni rico, sino todo lo contrario
- Diálogos de Carmelitas
- Aquí no hay quien viva

== Personal life ==
Rosa Fontana's father was poet Avelino Sevilla Hernández, whilst her husbands were Rafael Rivelles and Carlos Manuel Lemos, son of Carlos Lemos (actor). The daughter of Rosa Fontana is Esperanza Lemos, who is also an actress.
