= Life Goes On (1965 film) =

- Film poster
- Spanish: El mundo sigue
- Directed by: Fernando Fernán Gómez
- Screenplay by: Fernando Fernán Gómez
- Based on: El mundo sigue by Juan Antonio de Zunzunegui
- Produced by: Juan Estelrich
- Starring: Lina Canalejas; Fernando Fernán Gómez; Gemma Cuervo; Milagros Leal
- Cinematography: Emilio Foriscot
- Edited by: Rosa M. Salgado
- Music by: Daniel J. White
- Production company: Ada Films
- Distributed by: Nueva Films
- Release date: 10 July 1965
- Country: Spain
- Language: Spanish

Life Goes On (Spanish: El mundo sigue) is a 1965 Spanish melodrama film directed and written by Fernando Fernán Gómez, which stars Lina Canalejas and Gemma Cuervo. It is based on the 1960 novel by Juan Antonio de Zunzunegui.

== Plot ==
Set in post-War Madrid, primarily in Maravillas and Malasaña, the plot tracks the fratricidal feud between two sisters, Eloísa and Luisita.

== Cast ==
- Lina Canalejas as Eloísa, "Elo"
- Gemma Cuervo as Luisita
- Fernando Fernán-Gómez as Faustino
- Milagros Leal as doña Eloísa, the mother
- Agustín González as don Andrés
- Francisco Pierrá as don Agapito, the father
- José Morales as Rodolfo
- María Luisa Ponte as La Alpujarreña
- Fernando Guillén as Rafa
- José María Caffarel as Julito
- Pilar Bardem as Maruja
- Marisa Paredes as Floren
- José Calvo as don Francisco

== Production ==
Life Goes On is an adaptation of the 1960 novel El mundo sigue by Falangist author and RAE member Juan Antonio de Zunzunegui, which depicts a bleak vision of Madrilenian society, with Zunzunegui being, according to Fernán Gómez, "the writer who has best brought to narrative the enormous political failure of the Spanish post-war period". Despite the original author's acquaintance with the Francoist regime, the screenplay was banned by State censorship, and had to wait to a ministerial reshuffle (from Gabriel Arias-Salgado to Manuel Fraga) to be brought back, after some modifications. The film was produced by for Ada Films. Shooting took place in 1963. The film was nonetheless granted a negative C rating by the censorship board (on the basis of its purportedly poor aesthetics values), imperiling its commercial distribution.

== Release ==
Rather than an outright distribution ban, the film's release was restricted, with the film premiering at Bilbao's Cine Buenos Aires on 10 July 1965 under Nueva Films. The film was re-released on 15 July 2015 by A Contracorriente Films in 15 Spanish cities.

== Reception ==
Mirito Torreiro of Fotogramas rated the film 5 out of 5 stars, deeming it to be "one of the most terrifying and merciless moral portraits of Francoist Spain ever made by Spanish cinema".

== See also ==
- List of Spanish films of 1965
