= Juan Antonio de Zunzunegui =

Juan Antonio de Zunzunegui (21 December 1901, Portugalete — 31 May 1982, Madrid) was a 20th-century Spanish writer who mainly penned works of social criticism on the lives of contemporary people in the cities of Madrid and Bilbao. He primarily wrote novels and short stories, including the novel El premio (1961) which won Spain's National Prize for Literature. His novel El mundo sigue was adapted into the film Life Goes On (1965). The 1977 film Two Men and Two Women Amongst Them was based on his 1944 novel Dos hombres y, en medio, dos mujeres.

== External list ==
Juan Antonio de Zunzunegui at IMDb
