= Black Venus (1983 film) =

1983 film

- Directed by: Claude Mulot
- Written by: Harry Alan Towers (as Peter Welbeck)
- Produced by: Harry Alan Towers
- Starring: Josephine Jacqueline Jones; José Antonio Ceinos; Emiliano Redondo; Florence Guérin
- Cinematography: Jacques Assuérus and Julio Burgos
- Edited by: Antonio Ramírez de Loaysa
- Music by: Gregorio García Segura
- Distributed by: Playboy TV
- Release date: January 5, 1983
- Running time: 95 minutes
- Countries: United States; Bahamas
- Language: French (English dubbed)

Black Venus is a 1983 softcore erotic melodrama film directed by Claude Mulot. It purportedly is based on an unspecified short story by Honoré de Balzac. It was produced by Playboy Enterprises and originally aired in an edited 80-minute version on the Playboy Channel; an uncut English-dubbed version was released on DVD in 2006.

== Plot ==
When wealthy art collector Jacques visits a Parisian brothel operated by Madame Lili, he recognizes one of the prostitutes as Venus, a black Martinican woman.

In a flashback, Jacques remembers introducing Venus to a gifted but impoverished sculptor, Armand, who persuaded Venus to become his art model and lover. Armand grew increasingly obsessed with Venus and the statue of her that he was working on. To help Armand pay rent, Venus took work as a model for a dressmaker, Madame Jean. Several of Madame Jean's customers became enamored with Venus, among them Marie, a wealthy woman whose husband was often absent. Venus earned so much as a model that Armand accused her of being a prostitute.

Eventually Armand's obsession, jealousy and growing violence drove Venus away and she moved in with Marie as a kept woman. When Marie's husband Pierre returned home during a society ball, he discovered Venus in his home and ordered her to have sex with Louise, a 17-year old rural girl he had seduced with wealth. Pierre then invited several party guests to rape Louise, leading Venus to flee the house and return to work for Madame Jean. Venus later crossed paths with Louise, who had become a prostitute at Madame Lili's brothel. Louise persuaded Venus to join her in working for Madame Lili.

In the present, Jacques tells Venus that Armand finished his statue of her, but refuses to sell it despite being destitute and quite ill. After Venus begs him to help Armand, Jacques goes to Armand's studio, forces money on Armand and takes the statue of Venus over Armand's protests. Jacques then buys Venus and Louise's contracts from Madame Lili and takes both women to his house in Spain, where he installs the statue. Armand, having suffered a severe breakdown, follows them to Spain to take back both Venus and the statue at gunpoint. When Venus refuses, Armand shoots her and then kills himself. Armand's last words are to ask Jacques to take care of "her", leaving it unclear whether he meant the injured Venus or the statue.

== Cast ==
- Josephine Jacqueline Jones as Venus
- José Antonio Ceinos as Armand
- Emiliano Redondo as Jacques
- Helga Liné as Madame Jean
- Florence Guérin as Louise
- Mandy Rice-Davies as Madame Lili
- Karin Schubert as Marie

== Reception ==
The film has received mixed reviews based on its 2006 DVD release, with reviewers praising its artistic ambition but criticizing the uninspired performances of the lead actors. David Carter of Film Fanaddict noted the film's "obviously higher than average production values" and the "high level of elaborate costuming" while observing that its downbeat ending "makes BLACK VENUS standout from the crop of very similarly themed films made at the time." Christopher Armstead of Film Critics United praised the "high production values and over all skill of the filmmakers behind the camera" and noted the "lush and extravagant" costuming and "meticulous" set design contributed to a "well executed production," while also stating the poor acting of the leads prevented Black Venus from qualifying as a good film. Donald Guarisco of AllMovie described the film as "entertaining trash" with acting "bad enough to be genuinely entertaining." Cliff Wood of 10,000 Bullets called the film "an interesting curiosity at best that has some really good moments and some not so great moments that tend to overshadow the rest of the film."
