= Infra-Man =

1975 Hong Kong film by Hua Shan

- Theatrical release poster

Chinese name
- Traditional Chinese: 中國超人
- Simplified Chinese: 中国超人
- Literal meaning: Chinese Superman
Transcriptions
Standard Mandarin
- Hanyu Pinyin: Jūnggwok Chīuyàhn
Yue: Cantonese
- Jyutping: zung1 gwok3 ciu1 jan4
- Directed by: Hua Shan
- Written by: Ni Kuang
- Produced by: Runme Shaw
- Starring: Danny Lee; Wang Hsieh; Terry Liu; Yuan Man-tzu; Bruce Le; Kong Yeung; Dana Shum
- Cinematography: Nishimoto Tadashi
- Edited by: Chiang Hsing-lung
- Music by: Frankie Chan
- Production company: Shaw Brothers Studio
- Distributed by: Shaw Brothers Studio
- Release date: 1 August 1975 (Hong Kong)
- Running time: 88 minutes
- Country: Hong Kong
- Languages: Cantonese; Mandarin

Infra-Man (Chinese: 中國超人, lit. Chinese Superman, also known as The Super Inframan) is a 1975 Hong Kong superhero film directed by Hua Shan and produced by Runme Shaw. Produced and distributed by Shaw Brothers Studio, the film was inspired by the success of the Japanese tokusatsu franchise Kamen Rider that grew in popularity in Asian regions such as Taiwan, Hong Kong, and South Korea.

Infra-Man was released theatrically in Hong Kong on August 1, 1975.

== Plot ==
The story recounts that in 2015, Demon Princess Elzebub (also translated as Princess Dragon Mom) awakens from 10 million years of dormancy and plots to conquer the Earth. She destroys a few major cities in China to prove her power, and humanity reacts in shock. Returning to her lair in Inner-Earth, she awakens her army of Skeleton Ghosts and various mutant humanoids to wreak havoc on the surface.

In response, the head of the Science Headquarters, Professor Liu Ying-de, completes the BDX Project, a potential countermeasure against Elzebub. In the Science HQ's secret laboratory, he transforms Lei Ma, a high-ranking SH officer, into the bionic kung fu superhero Inframan. The solar-powered red-&-silver armored Inframan has both enhanced strength and powerful combat weapons.

Once Inframan destroys the Princess’s various monsters, she decides to steal the professor's blueprints of Inframan in hope of discovering his weakness. Meanwhile, the professor introduces Thunderball Fists, enhanced gloves capable of destroying any substance known to man, as well as covering up Inframan's weakness. Capturing the professor's daughter, the princess blackmails the professor into creating an Inframan for her. The professor agrees to go to Mount Devil for a meeting. When the professor refuses to make another Inframan, he and his daughter are frozen. Inframan and the Science Patrol decide to rescue both, leading to the final battle between Inframan and Demon Princess Elzebub, where he defeats her with his Thunderball Fists, causing the mountain lair to implode. As the Science Patrol rides back, Lin-Lin asks if Elzebub and her monsters will ever return, Liu assures her that as long as Inframan is around, the Earth will be safe.

== Cast ==
=== Protagonists ===
- Lei Ma/Inframan (雷馬/中國超人), the hero. Played by Danny Lee
- Professor Liu Ying-de (劉英徳), the proprietor of Science Headquarters. Played by Wang Hsieh
- Liu Mei-mei (美美), the Professor's daughter. Played by Yuan Man-Tzu
- Xiao Hu (小虎) Mei Mei's younger brother. Played by Lu Sheng
- Lin-lin (琳琳) Mei Mei's little sister. Played by Fanny Leung
- Zhu Qi-quang (朱啓光) The lieutenant of Science Headquarters. Played by Kong Yeung
- Lu Xiao-long (呂小龍) The sergeant of Science Headquarters and a tough fighter. Played by Bruce Le
- Zhu Ming (祝明) The awkward member of Science Headquarters, who is captured and turned by Elzebub into an evil spy. Played by Lin Wen-wei

=== Antagonists ===
- Demon Princess Elzebub (冰河魔主) The main villainess, ruler of Inner-Earth. Her name is a play on "Beelzebub". She is armed with a whip, and can turn into a winged dragon-like creature. In the U.S. English dubbed version, she is called Princess Dragon Mom. Played by Terry Liu
- Witch-Eye (電眼魔女) Elzebub's beautiful-but-deadly servant. Has a horned helmet and eyes on her palms that shoot green beams (hypnotic or destructive). In the U.S. English dubbed version, she is called She-Demon. Played by Dana Shum
- Skeleton Ghosts (白骨幽靈) Rank-and-file henchmen of the Glacier Empire. They dress in black-on-white suits with a skeleton motif, and with horned helmets. They also carry explosive metal spears.

=== Ice Monsters (冰河怪獸) ===
- Fire Dragon (噴火龍) A scaly reptilian humanoid spouting a large horned crown and mustache. Can shoot fire from his mouth. Played by Wai Lo
- Spider Monster (蜘蛛怪) A fat red spider creature that shoots web-bombs and acid from its mouth and grows to gigantic size. Played by Kazunari Mori
- Plant Monster (植物怪) A teal vine-like monster that plants itself into the ground and grows into giant killer vines. Played by Tien-Chu Chin
- Mutant Drill (穿山怪) A horned blue mole-like monster with a drill for a hand and a shovel-like claw for another. Played by Toru Kawai
- Long-Haired Monster (長髮怪) A red-skinned witch-like demon with long white hair and huge horns that shoot yellow beams from both its horns and hands. Played by Alan Chui Chung-San
- Iron Armor Monsters (鐵甲怪) Two mechanical knight-like monsters, whose heads and right hands spring forth (with coils) to strike their enemy and retract again. Played by Tang Chia and Yuen Cheung-yan

== Production ==
The film was directed by Hua Shan, written by science fiction writer Ni Kuang, produced by Runme Shaw and photographed by Tadashi Nishimoto. Music from Ultraseven (1967) and Mirrorman (1971) (both composed by Toru Fuyuki) is used in this film due to Shaw Brothers' involvement in internationally distributing the Sompote Sands film The 6 Ultra Brothers vs. the Monster Army the same year, which uses the same musical cues. Footage from the Toho film Submersion of Japan is also inserted, namely during the first 10 minutes of the film, due to Shaw also internationally distributing the film. The Inframan/Science Headquarters/monster costumes were provided by Ekisu Productions, which had done costumes for many Toei superhero TV shows of the same period. The film also starred Danny Lee as the superhero himself, and Bruceploitation star Bruce Le in a supporting role (he still got to display some of his martial arts skills in many scenes of the film).

The following year, Joseph Brenner brought this film to the U.S., and re-titled it simply Infra-Man (or Inframan), with the advertising campaign slogan "The Man Beyond Bionics!" attempting to capitalize upon The Six Million Dollar Man's success on American network television at the time. This film also has some historical importance as the first superhero film set in Hong Kong, the first film promotion in Hong Kong using a hot air balloon, and the first Shaw Brothers production using a storyboard.

In 2004, the film was released on DVD in Japan and Hong Kong.

== Reception ==
Roger Ebert, in his 7 March 1976 review for the Chicago Sun-Times, gave the film two and a half stars out of four, concluding "The movie even looks good: It's a classy, slick production by the Shaw Brothers, the Hong Kong kung fu kings. When they stop making movies like Infra-Man, a little light will go out of the world." Infra-Man has an aggregated score of 100% based on six critic reviews on Rotten Tomatoes.

On 30 April 1999, after Quentin Tarantino re-released Mighty Peking Man in North America, Ebert upgraded his rating for the film to three stars, explaining that "I find to my astonishment that I gave Infra-Man only two and a half stars when I reviewed it. That was 22 years ago, but a fellow will remember a lot of things you wouldn't think he'd remember. I'll bet a month hasn't gone by since that I haven't thought of that film. I am awarding Mighty Peking Man three stars, for general goofiness and a certain level of insane genius, but I cannot in good conscience rate it higher than Infra-Man. So, in answer to those correspondents who ask if I have ever changed a rating on a movie: Yes, Infra-Man moves up to three stars." The original review of the film as re-posted on Ebert's website accordingly gives the film three stars. Roger had never changed a rating for a movie before, and he did not do it for any other films before he passed away in 2013.

== Versions ==
The film was released on VHS under both Prism Entertainment and Goodtimes Entertainment. In the Goodtimes Home Video version of the American opening credits, an additional section was added in between the title and the cast and crew from the Prism version, giving the film the subtitle "Battles The Sci-Fi Monsters" in an attempt to appeal more to fans of that titular genre. In this additional but misleading sequence, short snippets from the film are used to introduce and inaccurately name the villains of the film, with some villain characters cut out entirely.

== Influence ==
Elements from the film influenced the 2017 revival of Mystery Science Theater 3000. Producer Joel Hodgson explained in an interview that Princess Dragon Mom was one of the influences for the mad scientist Kinga Forrester and that the skeleton-like Henchmen influenced the boneheads, including The Skeleton Crew Band.
