= Vente a Alemania, Pepe =

- Directed by: Pedro Lazaga
- Written by: Vicente Escrivá; Vicente Coello
- Produced by: Andrés Vicente Gómez
- Starring: Alfredo Landa; José Sacristán; Tina Sáinz; Antonio Ferrandis; Gemma Cuervo; Fernando Guillén; Josele Román; Rosa Fontana; Teófilo Calle; Manuel Summers
- Music by: Antón García Abril
- Release date: 1971
- Running time: 95 minutes
- Country: Spain
- Language: Spanish

Vente a Alemania, Pepe (Come to Germany, Pepe) is a Spanish film, which was directed by Pedro Lazaga. The premiere was in 1971.

== Synopsis ==
The films starts in a small village in Aragon, Peralejos. Angelino (José Sacristán), who was born there, comes back from Germany. He boasts about how rich he has become and describes the wonders of that country and its women. He persuades Pepe (Alfredo Landa) to emigrate to that country, so he can improve his life. However, once he is in Munich, he notices that life is harder than expected.
