= Challenge of the Tiger =

1980 film by Bruce Le

- Hong Kong film poster
- Traditional Chinese: 神龍猛探
- Simplified Chinese: 神龙猛探
Transcriptions
Standard Mandarin
- Hanyu Pinyin: Shénlóng měng tàn
Yue: Cantonese
- Jyutping: San^{4}lung^{4} maang^{5} Jau^{4} taam^{3}
- Directed by: Bruce Le
- Written by: Bruce Le; Fan Poon
- Produced by: Cheng Leung-on; Bruce Le; Ma Chieh-yi; Dick Randall
- Starring: Bruce Le; Richard Harrison; Nadiuska; Hwang Jang-lee; Bolo Yeung; Brad Harris
- Edited by: Cheng Keung
- Music by: Chow Fook-leung
- Production company: Dragon Films Company
- Distributed by: Mondo Macabro (DVD)
- Release date: 1980
- Running time: 88 minutes
- Countries: Hong Kong; Italy
- Languages: English; Mandarin

Challenge of the Tiger (Chinese: 神龍猛探; lit. 'Dragon Detective') is a 1980 Bruceploitation martial arts film directed by and starring Bruce Le, along with Richard Harrison, Nadiuska, Hwang Jang-lee, Bolo Yeung and Brad Harris.

== Plot summary ==
Two CIA agents—a kung fu master and a suave womanizer—track the stolen formula for a super-sterility drug from Spain to Hong Kong, battling terrorists and a Vietnamese spy ring for its possession.

== Cast ==
- Bruce Le as Huang Lung
- Richard Harrison as Richard Cannon
- Nadiuska as Maria
- Hwang Jang-lee as Comrade Yang
- Brad Harris as Leopard
- Bolo Yeung as Pang
- Chiang Tao as Kong
- Josef Laufer as Joe
- Sharon Shira as Anna
- Tito García as Mob Boss
- Dick Randall as Dick
- Sharon Shira as Asian Girl
- Jon T. Benn as CIA Director
- Jack Klugman as Himself
- Morgan Fairchild as Herself
- Jane Seymour as Herself

== Reception ==
David Johnson of DVD Verdict gave the film a positive review, writing: "I'll just say this: there's a lot of meaningless fighting, gratuitous nudity, specifically in the opening where one of our heroes plays a few round of slow-motion topless tennis, and one of the looniest fights scenes I've ever seen: Bruce Le vs. a bull.This film's worth comes only from the surreal factor, but it's an excellent companion piece to For Your Height Only."

== Post-release ==
=== Revival screenings ===
On Sunday, August 29, 2026 at 2 P.M., The Philadelphia Film Society, in collaboration with Reel Nomadic and Sights & Sounds Philadelphia, screen Challenge of the Tiger as the finale film of Reel Nomadic's Kung Fu Matinees film screening series. The screening takes place at The Philadelphia Film Society Center on Chestnut Street in Philadelphia, Pennsylvania. The screening event is hosted by local Philadelphia resident and film enthusiast Michael Hammel. An encore screening of the same movie occurs on the following Sunday, September 6th, hosted by Matt Faust of Sights & Sounds Philadelphia.
