= Way of the Dragon 2 =

1979 Hong Kong film by Lu Po Tu

- Theatrical release poster
- Directed by: Lu Po Tu
- Produced by: Jintana Ferriera; Ping Chung Hung
- Starring: Bruce Le; Feng Ku; Michelle Yim
- Release date: 7 November 1979 (France)
- Running time: 94 minutes
- Country: Hong Kong
- Languages: Cantonese; Mandarin

Way of the Dragon 2 (also known as Bruce Le's Greatest Revenge) is a 1978 Hong Kong martial arts film sequel to Way of the Dragon starring Bruce Le. The film is considered to be a Bruceploitation film. Despite the title, the film has more in common with the 1972 film Fist of Fury.

== Plot ==
A young student attempts to keep peace between a European club and some Chinese students but finds himself a victim of hatred.

== Cast ==
- Bruce Le
- Ku Feng
- Michelle Yim
- Hon Kwok Choi
- Yen Tsan Tang
- Bolo Yeung
- Li Yi Min
- To Siu Ming
- San Kuai
- Fong Yau
- Bill Lake
- Bruce Tong

== Release ==
The film was released in West Germany on 21 August 1980. The film was released in the Netherlands in 2008.

== Reception ==
Cityonfire.com said "Cheap, but not exactly terrible". The Video Vacuum gave the film 3 out of 4 stars.
