= Stephen Joseph =

British theatre director

Stephen Joseph (13 June 1921 – 4 October 1967) was an English stage director.

== Life ==
Stephen Joseph was born in London, the child of actress Hermione Gingold and the publisher Michael Joseph. He was educated at Clayesmore School in Dorset. At the age of 16 he became a student of the Central School of Speech and Drama, where he graduated two years later. From 1941 to 1946 he served as an officer in the Royal Navy, where he was awarded the Distinguished Service Cross.

After the war he studied English literature at Jesus College, Cambridge, leading to the award of an MA degree. While at Cambridge he joined Footlights and both wrote and directed La Vie Cambridgienne, a revue broadcast by the BBC in July 1948.

In November 1948 he joined the Lowestoft Repertory Theatre as director, then moved on to manage the Summer Theatre season at Frinton-on-Sea. While there he saw a production by Jack Mitchley of the Christopher Fry play A Phoenix too Frequent, staged in the round, which caused him to experience "a bee beginning to buzz at the back of my mind". He returned to the Central School of Speech and Drama as a tutor, then in 1951 was granted leave of absence to study for a degree in playwriting at the University of Iowa.

== Theatres in the round ==
On his return he set up a company, Studio Theatre Ltd, devoted to productions in the round. After many difficulties and frustrations in finding suitable venues in London, a chance meeting led in 1955 to his using the concert room in the Central Library at Scarborough, on the Yorkshire coast. Initially the company did a summer season in Scarborough, and in winter toured other towns, partly with a view to finding a more permanent home for the company.

This succeeded in 1962, when they found a disused cinema in Hartshill, Stoke-on-Trent, which became the Victoria Theatre, with Peter Cheeseman in charge. Meanwhile, Joseph was appointed as fellow, and subsequently lecturer in the Department of Drama at the University of Manchester. He refounded the theatre in Scarborough as the Scarborough Theatre Trust, which by 1967 was beginning to be successful with the assistance of new playwrights such as Alan Ayckbourn. His work was brought to an untimely end, however, by his death in Scarborough from cancer in 1967.

The Scarborough Theatre developed and became the Stephen Joseph Theatre. The Victoria Theatre in Stoke eventually relocated and became the New Vic Theatre. The Stephen Joseph Studio in Manchester is named in his honour. Alan Ayckbourn wrote

He knew more than any person I’ve ever known about playwriting, when it came to talking about it, and he knew more about directing than any living person, and I suspect he knew an awful lot about acting: he certainly managed to talk about it very lucidly and entertainingly and interestingly, although he must have been the World’s worst actor.

Stephen Joseph died aged 46, on Wednesday 4 October 1967, at his home in Scarborough. He had been working until the last. His legacy and name live on though in the theatres he created, the Stephen Joseph Theatre and the New Vic Theatre, and also through the playwrights he encouraged and inspired such as Alan Ayckbourn, Harold Pinter, James Saunders and Alan Plater.

== Books and professional societies ==
In 1961 he helped to found the Association of British Theatre Technicians, and in 1964 the Society of Theatre Consultants. He wrote the following books:

- Planning for New Forms of Theatre. London: The Strand Electric and Engineering Co. 1962.
- The Story of the playhouse in England. London: Barrie and Rockliff. 1963.
- Scene Painting and Design. London: Pitman. 1964.
- Theatre in the Round. London: Barrie & Jenkins. 1967.
- New theatre forms (Theatre and stage series). London: Pitman. 1968.
- (as editor) Actor and Architect. London: Manchester University Press. 1969.

== See also ==
- Stephen Joseph Studio

== Bibliography and sources ==
- Lane, Terry (2006). The Full Round: the Several Lives and Theatrical Legacy of Stephen Joseph. Duca della Corgna.
- 'Joseph, (Michael) Stephen Lionel', in Oxford Dictionary of National Biography (Christopher Webber)
- Stephen Joseph at SJT
- Stephen Joseph at Alan Ayckbourn
- Stephen Joseph Papers at the John Rylands Library, Manchester.
