= Tomás Picó =

Spanish actor and theater director

- Born: Tomás Picó Hormeño; 16 January 1940; Cáceres, Extremadura
- Died: 29 March 2013 (aged 73); Tarifa, Cádiz
- Occupations: Actor and theater director

Tomás Picó Hormeño (16 January 1940 – 29 March 2013) was a Spanish actor and theater director known for La gran familia and Canción de juventud (1962).

Son of an architect, he was born on 16 January 1940 in Cáceres and began his film career in the early 1960s. He made his debut at Teatro Eslava and he worked along Lina Morgan. He played George in Case of the Scorpion's Tale (1971), starring Evelyne Stewart. He appeared in Al Andalus, el camino del sol (1988), by Jaime Oriol and Antonio Tarruella.

In 2009 he was diagnosed with a lymphoma, and died four years later on 29 March 2013 at the age of 73 in Tarifa, Cádiz.

== Filmography ==
- Abuelita Charlestón (1962)
- La gran familia (1962) as Jorge
- Vacaciones para Ivette (1964)
- La familia y... uno más (1965)
- El halcón del desierto (1965) as Hussein
- El escuadrón de la muerte (1966)
- Cifrado especial (1966) as Ivan
- Seven Pistols for a Massacre (1967) as Coin Flip Loser
- El próximo otoño (1967)
- Los cuatro budas de Kriminal (1968) as Thomas Patterson
- Hour X Suicide Patrol (1969) as PFC George Harris
- Gradiva (1970) as The statue
- The Case of the Scorpion's Tail (1971) as George Barnet
- Dead Men Ride (1971) as Miner (uncredited)
- Una pareja... distinta (1974) as Seis dedos
- Fulanita y sus menganos (1976)
- The People Who Own the Dark (1976) as Victor
- Hasta que el matrimonio nos separe (1977)
- Eróticos juegos de la burguesía (1977) as Alex
- The Last Romantic Lover (1978) as 18 Carats (n°4)
- Visanteta, estáte quieta (1979)
- The Family, Fine, Thanks (1979) as Jorge
- Los pecados de mamá (1980) as Amigo de Rokillo
- Cariñosamente infiel (1981) as Juan
- Story of O: Chapter 2 (1984) as Hans
- Una espía enamorada (1984)
- In the Shade (1987)
- Al Andalus, el camino del sol (1989)
- La señora del Oriente Express (1989)
- Le Gorille (1990, TV Series) as Julio
- La huella del crimen 2 (1991, TV Series) as Ortega (final appearance)
