= King Boxer =

1972 Hong Kong film by Jeong Chang-hwa

- Film poster

Chinese name
- Traditional Chinese: 天下第一拳
- Simplified Chinese: 天下第一拳
- Literal meaning: Number One Fist in the World
Transcriptions
Standard Mandarin
- Hanyu Pinyin: Tiān xià dì yī quán
Yue: Cantonese
- Jyutping: Tin^{1} haa^{6} dai^{6} jat^{1} kyun^{4}
- Directed by: Jeong Chang-hwa
- Screenplay by: Chiang Yang; Jeong Chang-hwa
- Produced by: Run Run Shaw
- Starring: Lo Lieh; Wang Ping; Wang Chin-feng; Fang Mian; Tien Feng
- Cinematography: Wang Yung-lung
- Edited by: Chiang Hsing-lung; Fan Kung-yung
- Music by: Frankie Chan
- Production company: Shaw Brothers Studio
- Distributed by: Shaw Brothers Studio (HK); Warner Bros. (International)
- Release date: April 28, 1972 (Hong Kong)
- Running time: 97 minutes
- Country: Hong Kong
- Language: Mandarin
- Box office: US$10 million (rentals)

King Boxer (Chinese: 天下第一拳; pinyin: Tiān xià dì yī quán; lit. 'Number One Fist in the World', released in the United States as Five Fingers of Death) is a 1972 Hong Kong martial arts film produced by Shaw Brothers Studio, directed by Jeong Chang-hwa, starring Lo Lieh, and featuring fight choreography by Lau Kar-wing.

Released in the United States by Warner Bros. in March 1973, the film capitalized on the success of Warner's TV series Kung Fu and was responsible for beginning the North American kung fu film craze of the 1970s, with over 30 similar films being released in the U.S. in 1973 alone. Warner followed it with the first U.S.-Hong Kong martial arts co-production Enter the Dragon released later that same year, which was the most successful of the chopsocky films of 1973.

== Plot ==
A promising young martial arts student named Chao Chi-hao has spent most of his life studying under his master Sung Wu-yang, and has fallen in love with the master's daughter Ying-ying. After Master Sung fails to properly fight off a group of thugs, he sends Chi-hao to study under a superior master, Shen Chin-pei. He instructs Chi-hao to learn from Chin-pei and defeat the local martial arts tyrant, Meng Tung-shan, in an upcoming tournament in order to earn Ying-ying's hand.

Chi-hao meets a young female singer, Ms. Yen, on the road to the city and rescues her from Meng's thugs. She falls in love with him, but he resists her advances with difficulty. He reaches town and begins studying under Suen Chin-pei. After an initial beating by Chin-pei's star pupil, Han Lung, Chi-hao improves rapidly. One day, another thug of Meng's, "Iron Head" Chen Lang, breaks into the school and beats all of Chin-pei's students. Chin-pei finally arrives and fights him, but is struck by a dishonorable blow and wounded. Chi-hao tracks Chen Lang down and defeats him. When Chin-pei hears of this, he selects Chi-hao to receive his most deadly secret, the Iron Fist.

Han Lung discovers that Chi-hao has been chosen as Chin-pei's successor and becomes intensely jealous. He conspires with Tung-shan to have Chi-hao crippled. He lures Chi-hao into the forest, where Tung-shan's three new Japanese thugs - Okada, Oshima, and Zaemon - ambush him. They overpower him and break his hands. Later, they visit his Master Sung's school and kill him as well. Yen helps Chi-hao recuperate and again tries to woo him, but he resists her. Finally, Chi-hao's fellow students locate him and encourage him to regain his fighting spirit. He begins training and soon overcomes his wounds. Ying-ying arrives, but withholds the news of her father's death. A rejuvenated Chi-hao successfully defeats all the other students to become Chin-pei's representative for the upcoming tournament. Han Lung returns to Tung-shan with the news, but Tung-shan's son blinds him and casts him out.

On the day of the tournament, a conscience-stricken Chen Lang warns Chi-hao of the three Japanese thugs lying in ambush on the road to the arena. Chi-hao fights the thugs killing two of them. Then Chen Lang arrives and holds off the head of the Japanese thugs so that Chi-hao can get to the tournament on time. He arrives just in time and defeats Tung-shan's son to win the tournament. Tung-shan stabs and kills Chin-pei in the midst of the celebration and departs. As Tung-shan arrives back home, he discovers that all the lights are out. Han Lung appears in the darkened room and, guided by Yen's direction, fights Tung-shan and his son. Han Lung blinds the son, who is then stabbed by his father in the confusion. Tung-shan bursts out of the dark room and summons his minions who kill Han Lung and he himself kills Ms. Yen.

Chi-hao arrives at Dung Shun's house, but Tung-shan flees and commits suicide by stabbing himself before Chi-hao can fight him. As he leaves, the chief Japanese thug arrives with Chen Lang's head. He and Chi-hao face off. Chi-hao uses his Iron Fist power, causing his hands to glow red, and delivers several powerful blows that send the thug smashing into a brick wall. With the thug defeated and killed, Chi-hao, Ying-ying, and Ta Ming departs.

== Cast ==
- Lo Lieh as Chao Chi-hao (Chinese: 趙志豪; pinyin: Zhào Zhìháo)
- Wang Ping as Sung Ying-ying (宋瑩瑩; Sòng Yíngyíng)
- Wang Chin-feng as Ms. Yen (燕姑娘; Yàn Gūniáng)
- Tien Feng as Master Meng Tung-shan (孟公山; Mèng Gōngshān)
- Tung Lam as Meng Tien-siung (孟天雄; Mèng Tiānxióng)
- Fang Mien as Master Suen Hsin-pei
- Ku Wen-Chung as Master Sung Wu-yang
- Nam Seok-hoon as Han Lung
- Yau Lung as Tu Wei
- Chan Shen as Wan Hung-chieh
- Jin Bong-jin as Lu Ta-ming
- Kim Ki-joo as "Iron Head" Chen Lang
- Chao Hsiung as Master Okada
- Yukio Someno as Masataro Oshima
- Chiang Chuen as Zaemon
- Bolo Yeung as “Mongol” Baatar
- Yang Tse-lin as Gan

== Music ==
The theme song from the American television series Ironside, composed by Quincy Jones, is used as a leitmotif. The original score was composed by Chen Yung-yu and Frankie Chan.

== Release ==
King Boxer was released in Hong Kong on April 28, 1972. When the film was released in director Jeong Chang-hwa's native South Korea, it was re-titled The Iron Man. The distributor Shin Sang-ok sold the film falsely as a South Korean co-production to avoid paying import taxes. Ten minutes of the film are cut in this version, removing all the gorier scenes.

It was released in March 1973 in the United States as Five Fingers of Death. On re-release in the United States, it was titled The Invincible Boxer.

In December 2021, the film was released on Blu-ray in the UK as part of Arrow Films' Shawscope: Volume 1 box set, including an audio commentary by David Desser.

== Reception ==
=== Box office ===
In the United States and Canada, the film repeated its success in Europe. It earned US$4 million in American and Canadian rentals, the second highest-grossing film of the genre in the U.S. in 1973 after Enter the Dragon with rentals of US$4.25 million. Five Fingers of Death exceeded US$10 million in worldwide rentals by October 1973, and went on to earn US$4.6 million in North American rentals.

=== Critical reception ===
In a contemporary review for The New York Times, Roger Greenspun wrote, "I don't know much about karate, but I know what I like. And the karate in 'Five Fingers of Death,' for all its slow-motion high leaps, its grunts, its whooshing fists, has the look of the bottom of the barrel. It is all too extravagant, too gratuitously wild—as if composed for show, rather than for attack, defense or any real purpose." Variety called it "a Chinese actioner glossed with all the explosive trappings that make for a hit in its intended market ... Exquisitely-filmed and packed with colorful production values, direction by Cheng Chang Ho is powerful and direct and he gets top performances from cast headed by Lo Lieh, as the student, and Wang Ping as his beloved." Gene Siskel of the Chicago Tribune gave the film 2 stars out of 4 and called it "a shoddy, poorly dubbed melodrama stuffed with insane dialog," though he acknowledged "the genuine excitement generated by the fight sequences, providing you can get excited at the sight of a karate chop that splits a forehead." Fredric Milstein wrote in the Los Angeles Times, "Director Chen Chang Ho, who has a definite sense of style, keeps the pace fast and the action spectacular ... Dubbing is awful, but you don't come to this one to hear people talk." In a review for the Monthly Film Bulletin, John Gillett found that the trick effect in which characters leap into the air to land either in a tree or on the opposite side of an opponent become "somewhat tedious as the film progresses." However, "...the sheer panache of the staging and apparent enjoyment of the participants keep the narrative moving swiftly".

In a retrospective review, AllMovie gave the film three stars out of five, stating the film was "not the best Kung fu movie the Shaw Brothers put out, but as an early entry it holds up surprisingly well for a genre getting its legs." The review noted that "a more unfortunate stereotype perpetuated by this and future films is the Japanese as primitive ape-like villains" and that the film "drags a bit on what are now tired Kung fu clichés, but the punchy spirit that made it popular still survives".

Quentin Tarantino ranked the movie among his 11 favorite films of all time.

== In popular culture ==
Quentin Tarantino includes several references to King Boxer in his martial arts duology Kill Bill: Volume 1 and Kill Bill: Volume 2. Notably, the use of the "Ironside Theme" as a musical motif, and Tien-siung's eye-gouging move.

== Unofficial sequel ==
The 1977 film Bruce and the Shaolin Bronzemen was retitled in some territories as King Boxer 2.

== See also ==
- List of Shaw Brothers films
- Hong Kong action cinema
