= Bruce Le =

Burmese martial artist and actor (born 1950)

- Born: Wong Kin-lung (黃建龍); June 5, 1950 (age 75); Burma
- Occupations: Actor, director, martial artist
- Years active: 1972–1994, 2014–present

Chinese name
- Traditional Chinese: 呂小龍
- Simplified Chinese: 吕小龙
Transcriptions
Standard Mandarin
- Hanyu Pinyin: Lǚ Xiǎolóng
Yue: Cantonese
- Jyutping: leoi5 siu2 lung4

Bruce Le (simplified Chinese: 吕小龙; traditional Chinese: 呂小龍; pinyin: Lǚ Xiǎolóng; born June 5, 1950) is a martial artist and actor known for his martial arts films of the 1970s and 1980s. Most of these were inexpensively produced and were made to capitalise on the martial arts phenomenon started by Bruce Lee, whose death in 1973 left a large box-office void (hence the name change to "Bruce Le").

== Early life ==
Born in 1950 to a Taiwanese-Macau father and a Burmese mother, Wong studied gymnastics and martial arts in Burma before being discovered by Shaw Brothers, which hired him for supporting roles.

== Career ==
He was credited as Little Dragon because of his slight resemblance to Bruce Lee. He appeared in "Super Inframan," Hong Kong's answer to the transforming heroes of Japan's Henshin series.

As Bruce Le, he was a contract player for Shaw Brothers, where he appeared in the science-fiction opus Infra-Man. He is better known, however, for his Bruce Lee-inspired "tribute" films, also known as "Bruceploitation".

== Filmography (acting) ==
- Infra-Man (1975)
- Bruce's Deadly Fingers (1976)
- The Big Boss Part II (1976)
- Return of Bruce (1977)
- Bruce and Shaolin Kung Fu (1977)
- Bruce and the Shaolin Bronzemen (1977)
- Super Gang (1978)
- My Name Called Bruce (1978)
- Way of the Dragon 2 (1978) (a.k.a. Bruce Le's Greatest Revenge)
- Bruce and Shaolin Kung Fu 2 (1978)
- Enter the Game of Death (1978)
- Return of Red Tiger (1978)
- Re-Enter the Dragon (1979)
- Bruce the Super Hero (1979)
- Treasure of Bruce Le (1980)
- Bruce's Fist of Vengeance (1980)
- Bruce, King of Kung Fu (1980)
- Challenge of the Tiger (1980)
- The Clones of Bruce Lee (1980)
- Katilon Ke Kaatil (1981)
- Enter Another Dragon (1981)
- Cold Blooded Murder (1981)
- Bruce vs. Bill (1981)
- Bruce and the Dragon Fist (1981)
- Ninja Strikes Back (1982)
- Bruce Le vs. Ninja (1982)
- Cameroon Connection (1984)
- Future Hunters (1986)
- Return of the Kickfighter (1987)
- Ninja Over the Great Wall (1987)
- Bruce's Secret Kung Fu (1988)
- Sex and Zen (1991)
- Black Spot (1991)
- Comfort Women (1992)
- The Eyes of Dawn (2014)

Bruce Le has erroneously been credited by select video companies as appearing in the films Cobra, Return of Fist of Fury and Bruce Is Loose.

== Filmography (directing) ==
- Bruce the Super Hero (1979)
- Bruce, King of Kung Fu (1980)
- Challenge of the Tiger (1980)
- Ninja Over the Great Wall (1987)
- Ghost of the Fox (1990)
- Black Spot (1991)
- Comfort Women (1992)
- The Eyes of Dawn (2014)
