= Special Code: Assignment Lost Formula =

1966 Italian-Spanish-French Eurospy film by Pino Mercanti

- Directed by: Pino Mercanti
- Written by: Ernesto Gastaldi; Ugo Guerra
- Produced by: Carlo Bessi; Ugo Guerra
- Starring: Lang Jeffries; José Greci
- Cinematography: Angelo Filippini
- Edited by: Otello Colangeli
- Music by: Riz Ortolani
- Release date: 1966
- Countries: Italy; Spain
- Language: Italian

Special Code: Assignment Lost Formula (Italian: Cifrato speciale, Spanish: Cifrado especial, French: Message chiffré, also known as Special Code and Special Cypher) is a 1966 Italian-Spanish-French Eurospy film directed by Pino Mercanti and starring Lang Jeffries. Set in Istanbul, it was shot almost entirely in Catalonia.

== Cast ==
- Lang Jeffries as Johnny Curd
- José Greci as Lynn
- Helga Liné as Luana
- George Rigaud as Hoover
- Andrea Scotti as Maitre
- Philippe Hersent as Richard
- Janine Reynaud as Sheena
- Umberto Raho as Vasili
- Jacques Stany as Carl Monger
- Pietro Ceccarelli as Yang
- Tomás Picó as Ivan
- Ignazio Leone as Hoover's Agent
- Max Turilli as Oberst
- Claudio Ruffini as Thug
- Franco Pesce as Old Man
