= Lennon Naked =

2010 television film

- Written by: Robert Jones
- Directed by: Edmund Coulthard
- Starring: Christopher Eccleston; Christopher Fairbank; Naoko Mori; Claudie Blakley; Rory Kinnear; Andrew Scott
- Theme music composer: Dickon Hinchcliffe; John Lennon; The Beatles
- Country of origin: United Kingdom
- Original language: English

Production
- Producers: Edmund Coulthard; Katherine Lannon
- Cinematography: Matt Gray
- Editor: Philip Kloss
- Running time: 82 minutes
- Production company: Blast! Films

Original release
- Network: BBC Four
- Release: 23 June 2010

Lennon Naked is a 2010 television biographical film focusing on the life of John Lennon between 1967 and 1971. It stars Christopher Eccleston as John Lennon and was directed by Edmund Coulthard.

The film was first broadcast on 23 June 2010 on BBC Four, and received its US premiere on PBS on 21 November 2010 as part of Masterpiece Contemporary, airing the day before the American Masters documentary LennoNYC, which begins where Lennon Naked ended. The film premiered in Australia on 5 December 2010.

== Plot ==
In 1964, a reluctant John Lennon is persuaded by manager Brian Epstein to meet his father Freddie, who abandoned him seventeen years earlier, with the press in attendance. The reunion does not go well; Lennon and his father get into an argument, and he and Epstein leave angrily.

By 1967, Epstein has died and the Beatles are giving a press conference for their new film, Magical Mystery Tour. Lennon is sceptical about the film, but Paul McCartney convinces him to go through with the idea. Lennon invites his father to his mansion to live with him, allowing Freddie to meet his grandson, Julian.

Sitting with his wife Cynthia, Lennon reads the negative critical reception of Magical Mystery Tour, while comparing Cynthia to Brigitte Bardot, whom he plans to meet after he returns from India. Lennon finds a letter addressed to him, with the word "Breathe" written on it—later revealed to have been written by Yoko Ono. Later, after finding his father in a neighbour's house, Freddie reveals that he has a 19-year-old girlfriend named Pauline, with whom he wants to live. Lennon accuses Freddie of leaving him again and throws him out of the house.

After meeting Maharishi Mahesh Yogi, the Beatles go on a meditation retreat with him, only to return to London shortly afterwards, where they hold a press conference to denounce him as a fraud. That night, before meeting the band's press agent Derek Taylor, Lennon glimpses Yoko from a window. Lennon reveals to Derek that she sends him letters. While on their way to meet Bardot, Lennon tells Taylor he sometimes thinks he is Jesus Christ and, nervous about his meeting the actress, takes a tablet of LSD, as does Derek. The next morning, Lennon, in the midst of a drug trip and, remembering the public's reaction at his "more popular than Jesus" statement two years before, states that he can't walk on water after all. Lennon stays with his childhood friend Pete Shotton in his mansion and asks him to bring Yoko.

After Lennon and Yoko record what will become the album Two Virgins, they spend the night together. Lennon tells Shotton that he wants to live with Yoko. Sometime later, Lennon and Yoko hold a gallery event where Cynthia confronts him about his adulterous affair. Cynthia is willing to forgive Lennon, but he instead chooses Yoko. While Lennon is leaving, Julian is seen playing with a ball all alone, and he throws the ball at his father. Lennon, however, throws it away and doesn't pay attention to his son. Meanwhile, Derek is worried about Apple Records' financial situation and the impending release of the Beatles' eponymous double album. After losing patience with McCartney, Lennon and Yoko leave the meeting and go to their house, and take a picture that will later become the cover of Two Virgins.

Yoko reveals that she is pregnant, but loses the baby in a miscarriage when the police charge her with drug possession. After Lennon proposes to Yoko, he reveals to her at a press conference that his father has had another child, David. Lennon is later seen going through heroin withdrawal, and tells Shotton that Yoko is pregnant again and he needs to clean up the place. Shotton tells Lennon that he must do it himself, and leaves when Lennon refuses. Yoko suffers another miscarriage. In a meeting with the Beatles, Lennon announces to his partners that he is leaving the band. McCartney convinces Lennon not to tell the press. In 1970, after McCartney himself announces he is leaving the Beatles, Lennon throws rocks at McCartney's house.

Lennon is later seen with a therapist, Arthur Janov, who has him remember when he was six years old and living in Blackpool with his parents. In his memories, Lennon sees his parents deciding who will keep him, and Freddie has Lennon choose for himself; Lennon chooses his father. However, after seeing his mother Julia leave, Lennon runs after her, and Freddie leaves. A traumatised Lennon recounts how he shouted to his father to go with them, and how his mother told him that he was not going to live with her, but with her sister Mimi. Freddie is later reunited with Lennon in the hopes of writing Lennon's biography. Lennon presents Freddie with his song "Mother", but loses patience with his father once again and leaves him. Lennon and Yoko move to New York City; as the final scene shows them getting on a plane and flying away, onscreen text states that Lennon never returned.

== Cast ==
The credited cast consists of the following:

- Christopher Eccleston as John Lennon
- Christopher Fairbank as Freddie Lennon
- Allan Corduner as Arthur Janov
- Andrew Scott as Paul McCartney
- Naoko Mori as Yoko Ono
- Michael Colgan as Derek Taylor
- Craig Cheetham as Ringo Starr
- Jack Morgan as George Harrison
- Claudie Blakley as Cynthia Lennon
- Rory Kinnear as Brian Epstein
- Adrian Bower as Pete Shotton
- Di Botcher as Dot
- Eileen O'Brien as Lil
- Debora Weston as Gloria Emerson
- Dave Legeno as Les
- Charlie Coulthard as Julian Lennon
- Ray MacAllan as Cabbie
- Jonathan Rigby as Cynthia's lawyer
- Annabel Leventon as Rich woman
- David Annen as Hospital consultant
- Patrick Drury as Apple accountant
- Helen Bradbury as John's PA
- Peter Lawman as Journalist 1
- Roderick Smith as Journalist 2
- Dylan Charles as Journalist 3

== Production ==
Naoko Mori has confessed that she got drunk to film all the nude scenes in this movie. "I can"t really remember much of that day. Maybe it was the half bottle of tequila. I've always sworn I'd never do nudity on screen."

== Reception ==
According to Sam Wollaston of The Guardian, the film's "continual looking back over the shoulder to childhood, to his mother and father, takes Lennon Naked beyond the merely biographical: it gives it a depth and a Freudian quality"; putting aside minor issues with Eccleston's accent and his age (the 46-year-old actor was playing a man who is in his 20s for most of the film), Wollaston called Eccleston's work "a brilliant performance, in a brilliant film, because what Eccleston does get spot-on is the spirit of Lennon, with all his complications, contradictions and demons."

Upon its US premiere Robert Lloyd, the television critic for the Los Angeles Times, wrote "it doesn't much hang together as a drama and will be of interest mainly to Beatle completists and Eccleston fans, of whom there are, after all, more than a few....none of the actors are given enough space to build a solid character, either – even the formidable Yoko comes off as a bit of a simp. Minus any demonstration of his importance, and with Eccleston playing the pained, petulant John to the near exclusion of the talented, charming one, we are left just with a portrait of a rich and prickly young man."
