= Honeycomb (1969 film) =

1969 Spanish absurdist psychological drama film

- Spanish promotional poster
- Directed by: Carlos Saura
- Written by: Rafael Azcona; Geraldine Chaplin; Carlos Saura
- Produced by: Elías Querejeta
- Starring: Geraldine Chaplin; Per Oscarsson
- Cinematography: Luis Cuadrado
- Edited by: Pablo González del Amo
- Music by: Luis de Pablo
- Distributed by: Cine Globe; Delta Films
- Release date: June 1969
- Running time: 102 minutes
- Country: Spain
- Language: Spanish

Honeycomb (Spanish: La Madriguera) is a 1969 Spanish absurdist psychological drama film directed by Carlos Saura, co-written by Saura, Rafael Azcona and Geraldine Chaplin. The film stars Geraldine Chaplin and Per Oscarsson as a complicated married couple. It was entered into the 19th Berlin International Film Festival.

== Plot ==
Shortly after Teresa (Chaplin) sets fire to her husband's hair, the antagonized and reserved businessman agrees to participate in his pretty young wife's personality games. Teresa soon fills their contemporary home with family heirlooms she retrieved from the basement, and a sense of isolation takes over the house as the couple lock the doors and draw the shades away from the prying eyes of neighbours. However, all too soon these games reach a feverish intensity and fantasy soon blurs into reality.

== Cast ==
- Geraldine Chaplin as Teresa
- Per Oscarsson as Pedro (voiced by Jesús Nieto)
- Teresa del Río as Carmen (voiced by Mercedes Mireya)
- Julia Peña as Águeda
- Emiliano Redondo as Antonio (voiced by Fernando Mateo)
- María Elena Flores as Rosa
- Gloria Berrocal as La Tía
