= Mary Begoña =

Spanish actress and vedette (1925–2020)

- Born: María Begoña Labraga Picado; 1 April 1925; Bilbao, Spain
- Died: 12 April 2020 (aged 95); Madrid, Spain

María Begoña Labraga Picado (1 April 1925 in Bilbao, Spain – 12 April 2020 in Madrid, Spain), better known by the stage name of Mary Begoña, was a Spanish vedette and actress. She started dancing at age 7 and performed in venues in Madrid while she was studying at the Academies of Quiroga, Ompín and Monreal. Then she studied with Antonio Bautista and Sacha Goudine in Barcelona. She debuted in a musical revue at the age of fourteen and during Spanish Civil War (from 1936 to 1939) was part of the CNT Union. In 1943, Begoña worked in Valencia in Juanita Reina's acting troupe, but returned to Madrid to debut in the Teatro Calderón. In 1945 she appeared in the revue Danubio Azul (Blue Danube) with Manolo Caracol and Lola Flores and the following year was the principal vedette in the revue De la Tierra a Venus (From the Earth to Venus). For the next several years she performed in variety shows with various acting troupes, such as Tres días para quererte (1945), ¡Róbame esta noche! (1947), A La Habana me voy (1948). In 1951, she did a season in the US and then returned to Spain appearing in ¡A vivir del cuento! (1952) and Los líos de Elías (1954). Begoña then formed her own company, which between 1953 and 1960 performed ten different plays. As her career declined in revue style shows, she began performing in comedy theater, film, and television.

Her first film was La Reina del Tabarín (1960) by Jesús Franco but she received acclaim for ¡Cómo está el servicio! (1968) by Mariano Ozores. In television, she first appeared with Un caso de incomprensión (1965) but is best remembered as Aunt Asuncion on Hostal Royal Manzanares (1996–1998). After the television show ended, she appeared in two plays of note, Aprobado en castidad (2001) by Luis Peñafiel and with María Isbert in El cianuro ¿solo o con leche? (2003) by Juan José Alonso Millán. She retired in 2004.

== Selected filmography ==
- Queen of The Chantecler (1962)
- La becerrada (1963)
- A Decent Adultery (1969)
- Blood in the Bullring (1969)
- The Man Who Wanted to Kill Himself (1970)
- Death's Newlyweds (1975)
- Two Men and Two Women Amongst Them (1977)
- Father Cami's Wedding (1979)
- And in the Third Year, He Rose Again (1980)
