= Craig Cheetham =

English actor

- Born: Craig Cheetham; 10 January 1970 (age 56); Wigan, England
- Occupation: Actor
- Years active: 1998 — present

Craig Cheetham (born 10 January 1970) is an English actor. He is best known for his roles on Life on Mars and on Peter Kay's Max & Paddy's Road to Nowhere in which he played the character Billy Shannon in the second and sixth episodes of the series.

He has also performed in several radio dramas, including playing the character of Mike Tanner in the BBC Radio 4 drama Stone from 2015 to 2021.

== Career ==
He has featured in British soaps Coronation Street, Emmerdale and Hollyoaks. In Hollyoaks, he played Noel Ashworth, who returned to announce that he is the real father of Rhys Ashworth after an affair he had with his brother's wife Suzanne. His character was killed off after eight episodes.

In 2004, he played Billy Shannon in two episodes in the cult classic Max & Paddy's Road to Nowhere. After this, he has also had roles on Life on Mars, Brassic and Shameless.

In 2010, Cheetham portrayed Ringo Starr in the 2010 TV biopic, Lennon Naked.

As well as TV and radio, Cheetham has appeared in stage shows across Greater Manchester. Additionally he has appeared in adverts for several companies, including: Hyundai Motor Company (2018), Co-op Food (2016), Farmfoods (2012) and We Buy Any Car (2012).

== Selected filmography ==
- This Is Personal: The Hunt for the Yorkshire Ripper (2000), Peter Sutcliffe
- Heartbeat (2000), Lynch
- Fat Friends (2000), Ben
- In Memoriam (2002), Tom
- Shackleton (2002), Walter How
- Al's Lads (2002), Cook
- Doctors (2004), David Samuels
- Hollyoaks (2004), Paul
- Max & Paddy's Road to Nowhere (2004), Billy Shannon
- Emmerdale (2006), DC Jansen
- Life on Mars (2006), Russell Askey
- Hollyoaks (2007), Noel Ashworth
- Wire in the Blood 2008, Frank
- The Royal 2008, Roger Winstanley
- Shameless 2009, Keith
- Lennon Naked 2010, Ringo Starr
