= Nadiuska =

German-born Polish-Russian actress (born 1952)

- Born: Roswithka Bertasha Honczar; January 19, 1952 (age 74); Schierling, Bavaria, West Germany
- Other name: Nadjuschka
- Occupations: Actress, model
- Years active: 1972–1998
- Spouse: Fernando Montalbán Sánchez (m. 1973; ann. 1980)
- Parents: Emiliam Honczar (father); Maruschka Nadlovska (mother)

Roswithka Bertasha Smid Honczar (born January 19, 1952) is a former German model and actress who became a well-known celebrity in Spain during the 1970s, under the stage name Nadiuska.

== Biography ==
Born in 1952 in Schierling to a Polish mother and a Russian father, both Jewish, Nadiuska moved to Barcelona in 1971 and her career rapidly took off. She appeared in a number of sex comedies over the next decade, and appeared nude in Playboy magazine. She played Conan's mother in the 1982 Arnold Schwarzenegger film Conan the Barbarian. She co-starred with Spanish horror star Paul Naschy in his science fiction film The People Who Own The Dark. Years later she was committed to a psychiatric ward with schizophrenia.

== Filmography ==
Nadiuska film performances
Year	Title	Role	Notes
1972	Timanfaya (Amor prohibido)	La italiana	Uncredited
1972	Soltero y padre en la vida	Gunilla	
1973	La redada	Romy	Uncredited
1973	Lo verde empieza en los Pirineos	Paula - la camarera	
1973	Manolo, la nuit	Ingrid	
1974	Vida conyugal sana	Nati	
1974	El chulo	Isabel	
1974	Señora doctor	Lucía	
1974	Chicas de alquiler	Marta	
1974	Polvo eres...	Rocio Corrales 'La Nodo'	
1974	Tarzán en las minas del rey Salomón	Doris	co-starring Paul Naschy
1974	Perversión	Marisa	
1975	Una abuelita de antes de la guerra	Nina	
1975	Un lujo a su alcance	Pili	
1975	Zorrita Martinez	Zorrita	
1975	Spanish Fly	Julie	
1976	El señor está servido	Laly	
1976	La amante perfecta	Lina Rey	
1976	Beatriz	Basilisa	
1976	The People Who Own the Dark	Clara	
1976	La muerte ronda a Mónica	Mónica, Federico's wife	
1976	Desnuda inquietud	María, Daughter	
1977	Two Men and Two Women Amongst Them	María	
1977	Chely	Pepi	
1977	The More It Goes, the Less It Goes	Zuka	
1978	Mi mujer no es mi señora	María	
1978	Suave, cariño, muy suave	Eva	
1979	Guyana: Crime of the Century	Leslie Stevens	
1979	7 ragazze di classe	Merche	
1980	La noche viene movida		
1980	Challenge of the Tiger	Maria	
1981	Buitres sobre la ciudad	Denise Marciano	
1981	Las siete cucas	Julita	
1982	Conan the Barbarian	Conan's Mother	
1982	Othello, the Black Commando	Emily	
1983	La loca historia de los tres mosqueteros	Milady de Winter	
1983	El violador violado	Alicia	
1984	La de Troya en el Palmar	Ana	
1990	Seducción mortal	Patri	
1993	El tío del saco y el inspector Lobatón	Alicia	
1997	Brácula. Condemor II	Baronesa	
1998	Las dudas de Judas y Maria Magdalena	Maria Magdalena	

== Bibliography ==
- Goble, Alan (1999). The Complete Index to Literary Sources in Film. Walter de Gruyter. ISBN 978-3-59811-492-2.
