= Stone (radio series) =

- Genre: Radio drama
- Country of origin: United Kingdom
- Language: English
- Home station: BBC Radio 4
- Starring: Hugo Speer; Deborah McAndrew; Craig Cheetham
- Created by: Danny Brocklehurst
- Original release: 13 March 2009 – 5 February 2021
- No. of series: 9
- No. of episodes: 46

Stone is a BBC Radio 4 police drama series created by Danny Brocklehurst and starring Hugo Speer.

== Plot ==
The series follows Detective Chief Inspector John Stone and his team as they investigate dark and morally challenging crimes in Manchester.

== Cast ==
- Hugo Speer as DCI John Stone
- Zoë Henry as Catriona (Pilot and Series 1)
- Craig Cheetham as DI Mike Tanner
- Deborah McAndrew as DS Sue Kelly (Series 2-9)
- Conard Nelson as McAffrey (Series 5-7)

== Episodes ==
=== Pilot ===
Overall no.	Episode no.	Broadcast date	Episode title
1	1	16/02/2007	Mary Shane

=== Series 1 ===
Overall no.	Episode no.	Broadcast date	Episode title
2	1	13/03/2009	The Ties That Bind
3	2	20/03/2009	Dead Fishes
4	3	27/03/2009	God's Witness

=== Series 2 ===
Overall no.	Episode no.	Broadcast date	Episode title
5	1	29/09/2010	The Deserved Dead
6	2	06/10/2010	Collateral Damage
7	3	13/10/2010	The Bridge
8	4	20/10/2010	The Night

=== Series 3 ===
Overall no.	Episode no.	Broadcast date	Episode title
9	1	27/02/2012	Sleep Tight
10	2	05/03/2012	Demons
11	3	12/13/2012	Taken
12	4	19/03/2012	One of Our Own

=== Series 4 ===
Overall no.	Episode no.	Broadcast date	Episode title
13	1	18/01/2013	Something to Do
14	2	25/01/2013	Blood
15	3	01/02/2013	Heart of Darkness
16	4	08/02/2013	Mother Love
17	5	15/02/2013	White Van

=== Series 5 ===
Overall no.	Episode no.	Broadcast date	Episode title
18	1	07/05/2015	Dirt
19	2	14/05/2015	Blood Money
20	3	21/05/2015	A Cut Above
21	4	28/05/2015	Progress
22	5	04/06/2015	Broken

=== Series 6 ===
Overall no.	Episode no.	Broadcast date	Episode title
23	1	21/11/2016	Disclosure
24	2	28/11/2016	Wishing Well
25	3	05/12/2016	Casualties
26	4	12/12/2016	Damage

=== Series 7 ===
Overall no.	Episode no.	Broadcast date	Episode title
27	1	08/01/2018	Episode 1
28	2	09/01/2018	Episode 2
29	3	10/01/2018	Episode 3
30	4	11/01/2018	Episode 4
31	5	12/01/2018	Episode 5
32	6	15/01/2018	Episode 6
33	7	16/01/2018	Episode 7
34	8	17/01/2018	Episode 8
35	9	18/01/2018	Episode 9
36	10	19/01/2018	Episode 10

=== Series 8 (Retribution - The Unravelling of a Murder) ===
Overall no.	Episode no.	Broadcast date	Episode title
37	1	07/01/2019	Part 1
38	2	08/01/2019	Part 2
39	3	09/01/2019	Part 3
40	4	10/01/2019	Part 4
41	5	11/01/2019	Part 5

=== Series 9 (Protection) ===
Overall no.	Episode no.	Broadcast date	Episode title
42	1	01/02/2021	Dad
43	2	02/02/2021	Daughters
44	3	03/02/2021	Sisters
45	4	04/02/2021	Blame
46	5	05/02/2021	Control
