= Lina Canalejas =

Spanish actress

- Born: Concepción Álvarez Canalejas; January 29, 1932
- Died: 1 September 2012 (aged 80)
- Occupation: Actress
- Relatives: José Canalejas (brother)

Concepción Álvarez Canalejas (29 January 1932 – 1 September 2012), known as Lina Canalejas, was a Spanish actress who appeared in 1960s films.

She was the daughter of the violinist Manuel Álvarez Trigo, granddaughter of the pianist and composer Arturo Canalejas and sister of José Canalejas. In 1943 she started as a classical dancer. She joined the Zori, Santos y Codeso comedian group and they appeared in La blanca doble (1947). She also appeared in magazines, comedy (Archangels Don't Play Pinball) and drama films, including a career list of 50 films like La casa de las chivas, La viudita naviera (1963) by Luis Marquina and El mundo sigue (1965) by Fernando Fernán-Gómez.

In 1975 she appeared in El Love Feroz o Cuando los hijos juegan al amor, for which she won the Sindicato Nacional del Espectáculo award for best female lead role.

She retired in 1990 and played her last role in Niño nadie (1996), by José Luis Borau. She died on 1 September 2012 in Madrid from a cancer detected ten years before.
