= Claybody Theatre =

Community theatre company in Stoke-on-Trent, England

- Founded: 2013
- Type: Nonprofit
- Legal status: Charity
- Location: Stoke-on-Trent, Staffordshire, England
- Services: Theatre / Performing arts
- Key people: Deborah McAndrew (co-founder, creative director); Conrad Nelson (co-founder, artistic director)
- Website: www.claybodytheatre.com

Claybody Theatre is a community theatre company based in Stoke-on-Trent, Staffordshire, England. It was founded in 2013 by playwright and actor Deborah McAndrew and her husband, director and actor Conrad Nelson. Located at The Dipping House on the site of Stoke's former Spode pottery works, the theatre is known for producing plays on local themes, inspired by the lives and experiences of people from the Potteries.

The Claybody Theatre is a registered charity (no. 1202441); its mission is to "[shape] new and ambitious drama from the unique cultural heritage and contemporary lives of the people of North Staffordshire and Stoke on Trent". Acclaimed actor Toby Jones is a patron of Claybody Theatre.

== History ==
Claybody Theatre was founded in 2013 by British actors Deborah McAndrew and Conrad Nelson, who had moved to Stoke-on-Trent in 2001. For the first ten years, the company operated out of Stoke's Middleport Pottery site. Their inaugural production was Ugly Duck which was first performed at the School of Art in Burslem. English actor Toby Jones became the patron of Claybody Theatre in 2018 after watching one of their shows.

In 2023, Claybody Theatre became a National Portfolio Organisation (NPO), a guarantee of regular funding from Arts Council England until at least 2026. The same year, they moved to the site of the former Spode pottery factory in Stoke-on-Trent, taking occupancy of an industrial building previously known as Shed 8R. After transforming the building into a vibrant arts venue, they officially renamed it The Dipping House. Claybody Theatre had already been staging productions in various spaces at the Spode Works since 2017.

In October 2024, the company was endorsed by Gareth Snell, MP for Stoke-on-Trent Central, in a House of Commons debate. Snell highlighted Claybody Theatre as an example of Stoke's creative industries and described their recent production Bright Lights Over Bentilee as "a wonderful piece of theatre" for which he was "grateful".

The Dipping House became their permanent home in August 2025. A 15-year lease was agreed with the city council to allow Claybody Theatre to remain in the building until at least 2040. Conrad Nelson said that they "[would] not change the fabric or the look of the building inside or out" as they were committed to preserving the building's former industrial identity.

In April 2026, Claybody Theatre was awarded £150,000 through the UK Government's Arts Everywhere Fund. They were one of the first organisations to benefit from the new funding package, delivered by Arts Council England to support the UK's cultural sector. They plan to use the investment to make improvements to the Dipping House performance venue, including new flooring, lighting and seating.

== Productions ==
- Ugly Duck (2013 & 2014) – first performed at the Burslem School of Art in 2013, transferred to the Foyle Studio at mac, Birmingham as part of the Capital Theatre Festival, revived in September 2014 at the New Vic Theatre in Newcastle-under-Lyme.
- Digging In (2015) – a play for schools about the children of mining families during the 1984–85 miners' strike, written by Deborah McAndrew and directed by Conrad Nelson. Performed at five schools in Stoke-on-Trent, ending with a free public performance at the Mitchell Arts Centre on 26 June 2015.
- Dirty Laundry (October 2017) – domestic thriller set in Stoke-on-Trent in the 1950s, written by Deborah McAndrew and directed by Conrad Nelson, performed at Spode Works.
- Hot Lane (November 2018) – a powerful tale of passion and betrayal in the Six Towns during the 1950s, written by Deborah McAndrew and directed by Conrad Nelson, performed at Spode Works.
- Brassed Off (June 2019) – stage adaptation of the 1996 British film Brassed Off, directed by Conrad Nelson, staged at the New Vic Theatre in Newcastle-under-Lyme.
- The D Road (October 2019) – written by Deborah McAndrew, set on a piece of land next to the A500 road, performed at Spode Works.
- Greenwood Dreams (2020) – online choral work; winner of the Staffordshire Day Film Festival in 2021.
- The Call (2020/2021) – audio drama series starring English actor Mark Benton.
- The Silver Arrow (June 2021) – extended live version of Greenwood Dreams, performed at Stoke Minster.
- The Card by Hanley author Arnold Bennett (2022 & 2023) – musical stage adaptation by Deborah McAndrew, performed at Fenton Town Hall in June/July 2022, remounted at Newcastle's New Vic Theatre in May/June 2023.
- Song of the Sytch (October 2023) – set in 1930s Burslem, written by Deborah McAndrew, performed at Dipping House.
- An Audience with Toby Jones (February 2024) – onstage Q&A event with actor and theatre patron Toby Jones, held at Dipping House.
- Bright Lights Over Bentilee (September/October 2024) – about the 1960s UFO sightings over Bentilee (one of the largest council estates in Stoke), performed at Dipping House.
- Hootenanna (31 December 2024) – online New Year's Eve event, a celebration of Stoke-on-Trent's nannas.
- Ode To Arthur (July 2025) – a performance created in response to the work of local playwright Arthur Berry, staged at Dipping House.
- The Grand Babylon Hotel by Arnold Bennett (October 2025) – adapted for the stage by Deborah McAndrew and directed by Conrad Nelson, staged in collaboration with the New Vic Theatre in Newcastle-under-Lyme. The production was then toured in Spring 2026, starting at The Dipping House and visiting Hull Truck Theatre, Scarborough's Stephen Joseph Theatre, Colchester's Mercury Theatre and the Harrogate Theatre.
- A Christmas Carol by Charles Dickens (December 2025) – stage adaptation by Deborah McAndrew, performed at Dipping House.

== Audio Drama for Schools ==
As well as presenting stage adaptations and original theatre productions, Claybody Theatre has developed the "Audio Drama for Schools" program which provides primary school children with the skills to create audio dramas. Their "Sounds for Stories" workshops have been offered to Year 5 children in a number of local primary schools and academies, including Sutherland Primary Academy in Blurton, St. Luke's CE Primary School in Endon, Carmountside Primary Academy in Abbey Hulton, and Smallthorne Primary Academy in Smallthorne.
