= Emiliano Redondo =

Spanish actor (1937–2014)

- Born: 15 August 1937; Córdoba, Andalucía, Spain
- Died: 15 November 2014 (aged 77); Madrid, Spain
- Other name: Emiliano Redondo Ares
- Occupation: Actor
- Years active: 1959-2001

Emiliano Redondo (1937–2014) was a Spanish film and television actor.

== Biography ==
After completing his high school studies, he moved to Madrid where he began studying Law. His time at university allowed him to make his first contacts with the world of acting through the Teatro Español Universitario. He also enrolled at the Official School of Cinematography (where he would go on to teach between 1968 and 1971) and finally made his debut in film and television in 1959.

Over the next four decades, he developed his artistic career alternating between three media: radio, film, and television, almost always in supporting roles.

== Partial filmography ==
- College Boarding House (1959) - Estudiante
- Tiempo de amor (1964) - Armando (segment "La noche")
- La nueva Cenicienta (1964)
- Megatón Ye-Ye (1965)
- El marqués (1965) - Lawyer
- Zampo y yo (1966) - El payaso loco
- Las 4 bodas de Marisol (1967)
- Peppermint Frappé (1967) - Arturo
- Pero... ¿en qué país vivimos? (1967)
- El hueso (1967)
- Persecución hasta Valencia (1968)
- Relaciones casi públicas (1969)
- Honeycomb (1969) - Antonio
- El cronicón (1970)
- Mecanismo interior (1971)
- La araucana (1971)
- Antony and Cleopatra (1972) - Mardian
- Love and Pain and the Whole Damn Thing (1973) - The Spanish Gentleman
- Autopsia (1973) - Doctor
- Los muertos, la carne y el diablo (1974)
- Solo ante el Streaking (1975) - Valentín
- Spanish Fly (1975) - Clean Domingo
- Madrid, Costa Fleming (1976) - Contestat
- La noche de los cien pájaros (1976) - Gustavo
- The People Who Own the Dark (1976) - Dr. Messier
- Nosotros que fuimos tan felices (1976) - Félix
- Viaje al centro de la Tierra (1977) - Prof. Kristoff
- La violación (1977)
- Miedo a salir de noche (1980) - Dependiente (uncredited)
- Los locos vecinos del 2º (1980) - Charly
- Los liantes (1981) - Sixto Calapeña
- Trágala, perro (1981) - Fray Andrés Rivas
- La casa del paraíso (1982)
- Cristóbal Colón, de oficio... descubridor (1982) - Toscanelli
- Morte in Vaticano (1982)
- De camisa vieja a chaqueta nueva (1982) - Padre Llaneza
- Black Venus (1983) - Jacques
- Treasure of the Four Crowns (1983) - Brother Jonas
- El currante (1983) - Aspirante a Director General
- Los caraduros (1983) - Calabazate
- Tuareg – The Desert Warrior (1984) - Prison Warden
- Christina (1984) - Jean
- ¡Qué tía la C.I.A.! (1985) - Agente de la DDR
- El elegido (1985) - Comisario
- Crystal Heart (1986) - Dr. Navarro
- Los presuntos (1986) - Mafioso español
- Fist Fighter (1989) - Delgado
- Tie Me Up! Tie Me Down! (1989) - Decorador
- Disparate nacional (1990)
- Retrato de Família (1991) - Carlos
- Shooting Elizabeth (1992) - Man
- La ley de la frontera (1995) - Prior convento
- Hermana, pero ¿qué has hecho? (1995)

== Bibliography ==
- Kenneth S. Rothwell. A History of Shakespeare on Screen: A Century of Film and Television. Cambridge University Press, 2004.
