= Gemma Cuervo =

Spanish actress (1934–2026)

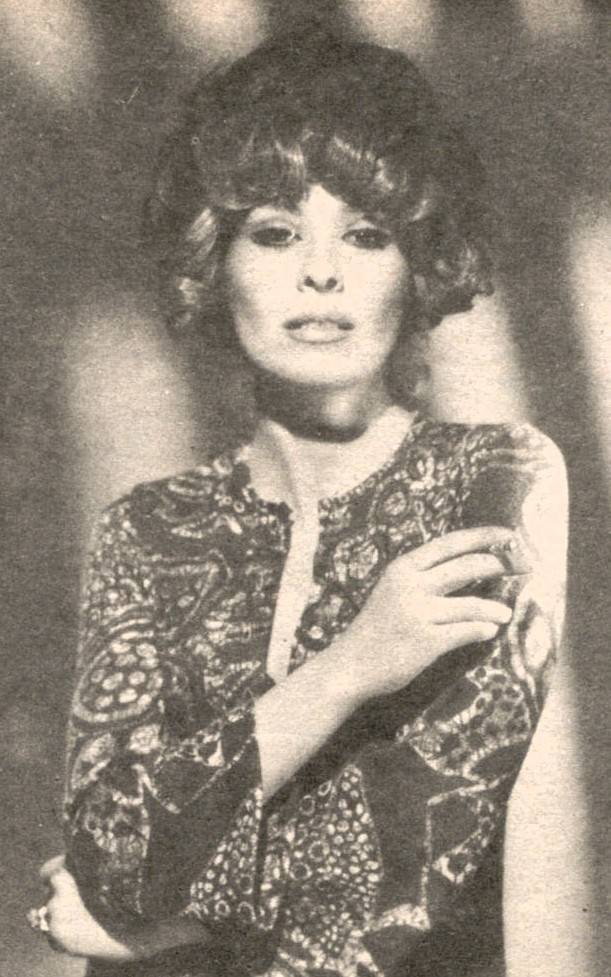
- Cuervo in 1975
- Born: Gemma Cuervo de Igartua; 22 July 1934; Barcelona, Spain
- Died: 14 March 2026 (aged 91); Madrid, Spain
- Occupation: Actress
- Years active: 1956–2026
- Spouse: Fernando Guillén
- Children: 3, including Fernando and Cayetana

Gemma Cuervo de Igartua (22 July 1934 – 14 March 2026) was a Spanish television, film and theatre actress. Her role in the sitcom Aquí no hay quien viva made her one of the most popular and beloved actresses among the public in Spain.

== Early life ==
Cuervo was born in Barcelona, Spain, on 22 July 1934. Her father was a military officer who died at the beginning of the Spanish Civil War in July 1936 in Reus when she was 2 years old.

She interrupted her studies on business administration at the School of Commerce while also being a member of the University Spanish Theater. She made her first stage performance in 1956 in the play The Love of Don Perlimplín and Belisa in the Garden and her acting debut in 1959 in Madrid in Harvey, a play directed by Adolfo Marsillach. She later joined José Tamayo's "Cía. Lope de Vega" theater company and settled in Madrid when she was 20.

== Career ==
Luigi Canalda trained her in singing and vocal technique, and critics praised her ability to interpret demanding, philosophical texts by authors such as Albert Camus and Jean-Paul Sartre.

Her first television appearance was in 1963, when she appeared in a live production of Alexandre Dumas's play Don Juan de Maraña, and from then on she was part of the program Estudio 1.

Together with her husband, the actor Fernando Guillén, she founded her own theater company in 1969, performing in plays such as García Lorca's Blood Wedding and Camus's The Misunderstanding, and works by Shakespeare, Edward Albee and Ana Diosdado in several towns in Spain and other countries.

She appeared in films such as La vida es maravillosa (1956), Life Goes On (1965), Los chicos del Preu (1967), Vente a Alemania, Pepe (1971), Señora doctor (1974), Best Seller (El Premio) (1996), The Queen of Spain (2016) and La reina del convento (2024), and in TV series such as Historias para no dormir, Cuéntame cómo pasó and Médico de familia. Among the plays in which she appeared, the following stand out: Cantar de los Siete Infantes de Lara, Punishment without Revenge, Águila de Blasón, Kennedy's Children, Don Juan Tenorio and Blood Wedding. In the 1970s and 1980s, Cuervo toured in Venezuela and Mexico.

Cuervo gained immense popularity in 2003 for her role of the naive, single and slightly eccentric elderly woman Vicenta in the Antena 3 sitcom Aquí no hay quien viva, forming a trio of retired grandmothers alongside actresses Mariví Bilbao and Emma Penella. Years later she also worked in La que se avecina as María Teresa Valverde until the fourth season in 2010.

Her last theater role was in a production of La Celestina in 2011. In total, Cuervo appeared in over 100 plays, 30 television series, and more than 60 films.

In 2024, Cuervo provided the Spanish voice for the character Nostalgia in Inside Out 2. One of her last public appearances was in La 1 talk show La revuelta on 19 November 2025.

== Personal life and death ==
Cuervo was married to the actor Fernando Guillén on 18 July 1960 and they had three children: Fernando, Cayetana and Natalia.

Cuervo died in Madrid on 14 March 2026, at the age of 91. She was hospitalized, where she received palliative care following a flare-up of the COPD she had been suffering from. Numerous figures from the worlds of entertainment, such as Antonio Banderas, Malena Alterio, Maribel Verdú, Paz Vega and Luis Merlo, and politics expressed their condolences, including the prime minister Pedro Sánchez, the president of the Congress of Deputies Francina Armengol, the mayor of Madrid José Luis Martínez-Almeida and president of the Community of Madrid Isabel Díaz Ayuso. The funeral service was set up the following day at the Tanatorio de la Paz in Tres Cantos.

== Filmography ==
=== Film ===
Year	Title	Role	Notes	Ref.
1965	El mundo sigue (Life Goes on)	Luisita		
1971	Vente a Alemania, Pepe	María		
1990	Boom boom	Madre de Angel ('Angel's mother')		
1996	Best-seller, el premio	Adela		
1998	¡Qué vecinos tan animales!	Sra. Cigueña, portavoz		
1999	Em dic Sara	Madre de Sara ('Sara's mother')		

== Honors and awards ==
- Gold Medal of Merit in the Fine Arts (2024)
- Lifetime Achievement Award at the Actors and Actresses Union Awards (2023)
- Honorary Max Award (2021)
- Silver Medal of the Community of Madrid (2018)
- Premios Ondas (1971–1972)
- National Theater Prize (1965)
