= Peter Cheeseman =

British theatre director (1932–2010)

- Born: Peter Barrie Cheeseman; 27 January 1932; Cowplain, Hampshire, England, UK
- Died: 27 April 2010 (aged 78); Stoke-on-Trent, England, UK
- Education: University of Sheffield
- Occupation: Theatre director
- Known for: Pioneering theatre in the round

Peter Barrie Cheeseman, CBE (27 January 1932, Cowplain, Hampshire – 27 April 2010, Stoke-on-Trent) was a British theatre director who is credited with having pioneered "theatre in the round".

== Early life ==
His father's work as a Naval Communications Officer took him and his young family to many locations around England, and Peter was educated at ten schools (of which the last was Quarry Bank High School in Liverpool) before attending Sheffield University (1952) where he graduated in 1955 with a degree in English, Latin and Modern History.

Cheesman started his theatre work while he was in the RAF, and did some directing at university (including an "ambitious" production of King Lear).

== Career ==
After involvement with the left-wing Unity Theatre in Liverpool and work at Derby Playhouse Cheeseman joined Stephen Joseph's peripatetic Studio Theatre (in the round) which was then based in Scarborough. In 1962, Joseph and Cheeseman gained the use of a former cinema in Hartshill, Stoke-on-Trent, and converted it into the Victoria Theatre, a square playing space where the audience viewed the performance from all four sides.

Cheeseman became the sole artistic director for the following 36 years. In that time he produced new plays from such writers as Peter Terson and Alan Ayckbourn, using young acting talent such as Ben Kingsley. He was responsible for over 140 productions, old and new. A speciality was plays with a local resonance, such as The Knotty, about the North Staffordshire Railway, and The Fight for Shelton Bar, about the closure of a local steelworks.

Cheeseman masterminded the move in 1986 to a new purpose-built building, specifically designed for theatre in the round, the New Vic Theatre in nearby Newcastle-under-Lyme. He finally retired in 1998, and in that year was appointed a CBE. In retirement he remained active, spending eight years as Chair of the National Council for Drama Training. In 2009 he was recipient of the Young Vic Award for a lifetime's encouragement and inspiration to a younger generation of theatre artists.

Mike Leigh, who was involved with the Victoria Theatre in the 1960s, said

"Working with Peter was a special and creative time. Great friendships were made. There was something special about what Peter made people do and made people be. The kind of spirit in which we worked, to be political and truthful, was down to Peter. He is a genius, a vagabond, a facilitator. What he has achieved is colossal and he is regarded with great respect and love."

== Death and legacy ==
Peter Cheeseman died on 27 April 2010 of inanition and vascular dementia, after a long battle with Parkinson's disease.

Staffordshire University inaugurated the annual Peter Cheeseman Lectures. His work is now regarded as a suitable topic for academic study.
