= New Vic Theatre =

Theatre in Newcastle-under-Lyme, England

Coordinates: 53.0161°N 2.2145°W

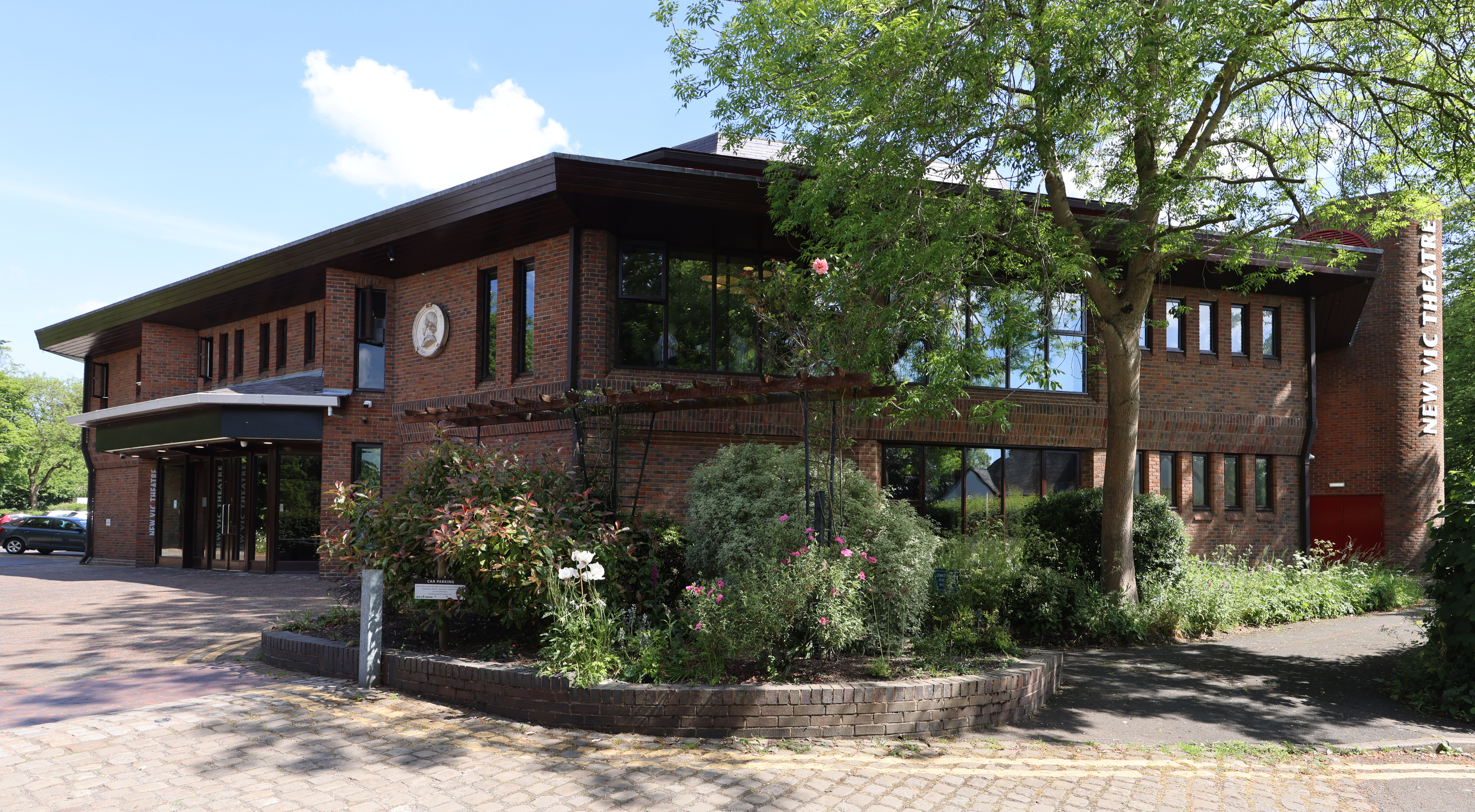
The exterior of the New Vic Theatre

The New Vic Theatre is a purpose-built theatre in the round in Newcastle-under-Lyme, Staffordshire. The theatre opened in 1986, replacing a converted cinema, the Victoria Theatre in Hartshill, Stoke-on-Trent.

== History ==
In the early 1960s, Stephen Joseph was searching for a permanent base for his Studio Theatre company which specialised in theatrical productions in the round. He found it in a disused cinema in Hartshill which was converted for theatrical use and opened as a playhouse on 9 October 1962. The first resident director was Peter Cheeseman who remained in control for 36 years, bar a period in 1967–68 when he was temporarily replaced by the management.

The company soon established a reputation for innovative productions of both new and classic works. A particular focus was on plays with a local subject, such as The Knotty, about the North Staffordshire Railway, The Fight for Shelton Bar, about the closure of a local steelworks, and Jolly Potters.

The first production of a play by Peter Terson took place there in 1964; he was writer in residence for 18 months and wrote 22 plays for the Victoria.

As well as drama, the venue was also used for classical and other music. The square layout of the performance area and audience created an excellent acoustic for chamber music. The Lindsay String Quartet performed there regularly in the 1970s.

By 1985, over 280 productions had been staged. The need had been felt for a larger, purpose-built building from the very start, and this was created in nearby Newcastle-under-Lyme and opened its doors in 1986 after many years of fundraising, negotiation with local councils and construction. The new venue took the name The New Victoria Theatre, often abbreviated to "New Vic", and this shortened name was formally adopted later. Whereas the old theatre had a seating capacity of 389, the main auditorium in the new theatre has a capacity of just over 600, with the audience surrounding a central stage as before. The musical acoustics are good and the Lindsay String Quartet performed there regularly, as they had done at the old theatre.

The New Vic continues to keep close to its Potteries roots. One of the plays in its re-opening season was by local playwright Arthur Berry. In 2023, the theatre showed a production of Arnold Bennett's The Card, whose Artistic Director was Conrad Nelson, (who had earlier premiered the play with the Claybody Theatre in Fenton, one of Stoke-on-Trent's six towns).

In 1998, Peter Cheeseman retired as Artistic Director, and was succeeded by Gwenda Hughes. In 2007, she was succeeded by current Artistic Director, Theresa Heskins.
