= Miser =

Person who is reluctant to spend

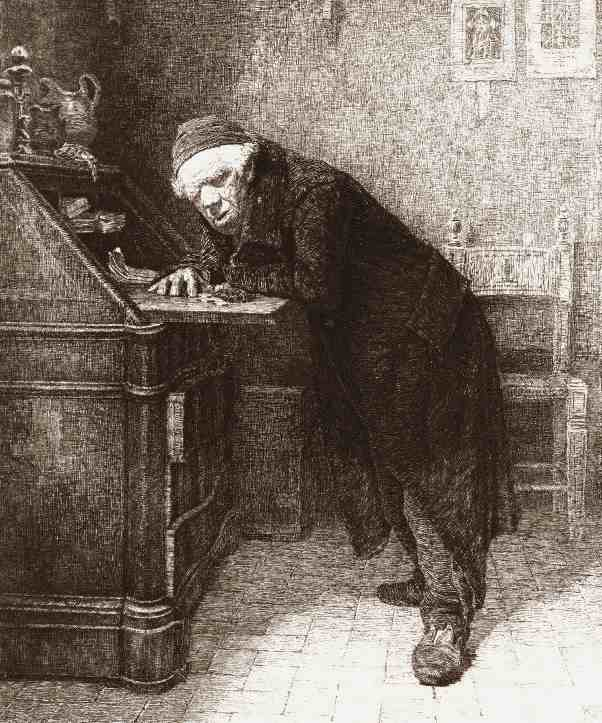
A detail from L'Avaro, a print by Antonio Piccinni (1878)

A miser /ˈmaɪzər/, or scrooge, is a person who is reluctant to spend money, sometimes to the point of forgoing even basic comforts and some necessities, in order to hoard money or other possessions. Although the word is sometimes used loosely to characterise anyone who is mean with their money, if such behaviour is not accompanied by taking delight in what is saved, it is not properly miserly.

Misers have been a perennial object of popular fascination and a source for writers and artists in many cultures.

== Accounting for misers ==
One attempt to account for miserly behaviour was Sigmund Freud's theory of anal retentiveness, attributing the development of miserly behaviour to toilet training in childhood, although this explanation is not accepted by modern evidence-based psychology.

In the Christian West the attitude to those whose interest centred on gathering money has been coloured by the teachings of the Church. From its point of view, both the miser and the usurer were guilty of the cardinal sin of avarice and shared behaviours. According to the parable of the Elm and the Vine in the quasi-Biblical Shepherd of Hermas, the rich and the poor should be in a relationship of mutual support. Those with wealth are in need of the prayers of the poor for their salvation and can only earn them by acts of charity. A typical late example of Christian doctrine on the subject is the Reverend Erskine Neale's The Riches that Bring No Sorrow (1852), a moralising work based on a succession of biographies contrasting philanthropists and misers.

Running parallel has been a disposition, inherited from Classical times, to class miserly behaviour as a type of eccentricity. Accounts of misers were included in such 19th century works as G. H. Wilson's four-volume compendium of short biographies, The Eccentric Mirror (1807). Such books were put to comic use by Charles Dickens in Our Mutual Friend (serialised 1864–1865), with its cutting analysis of Victorian capitalism. In the third section of that novel, Mr Boffin decides to cure his ward Bella Wilfer of her obsession with wealth and position by appearing to become a miser. Taking her with him on a round of the bookshops,

Mr Boffin would say, 'Now, look well all round, my dear, for a Life of a Miser, or any book of that sort; any Lives of odd characters who may have been Misers.' .... The moment she pointed out any book as being entitled Lives of eccentric personages, Anecdotes of strange characters, Records of remarkable individuals, or anything to that purpose, Mr Boffin's countenance would light up, and he would instantly dart in and buy it.'

In the following chapter, Mr Boffin brings a coachload of the books to his premises and readers are introduced to a selection of typical titles and to the names of several of the misers treated in them. Among the books appear James Caulfield's Portraits, Memoirs, and Characters of Remarkable Persons (1794–1795); Kirby's Wonderful Museum of Remarkable Characters (1803); Henry Wilson's Wonderful Characters (1821); and F. Somner Merryweather's Lives and Anecdotes of Misers or The Passion of Avarice displayed in the parsimonious habits, unaccountable lives and remarkable deaths of the most notorious misers of all ages (1850).

The majority of the misers are 18th century characters, with John Elwes and Daniel Dancer at their head. The first account of Elwes' life was Edward Topham's The Life of the Late John Elwes: Esquire (1790), which was initially published in his paper The World. The popularity of such accounts is attested by the seven editions printed in the book's first year and the many later reprintings under various titles. Biographies of Dancer followed soon after, at first in periodicals such as the Edinburgh Magazine and the Sporting Magazine, then in the compendiums Biographical Curiosities (which also included Elwes) and The Strange and Unaccountable Life of Daniel Dancer, Esq. ... with singular anecdotes of the famous Jemmy Taylor, the Southwark usurer (1797), which was often to be reissued under various titles.

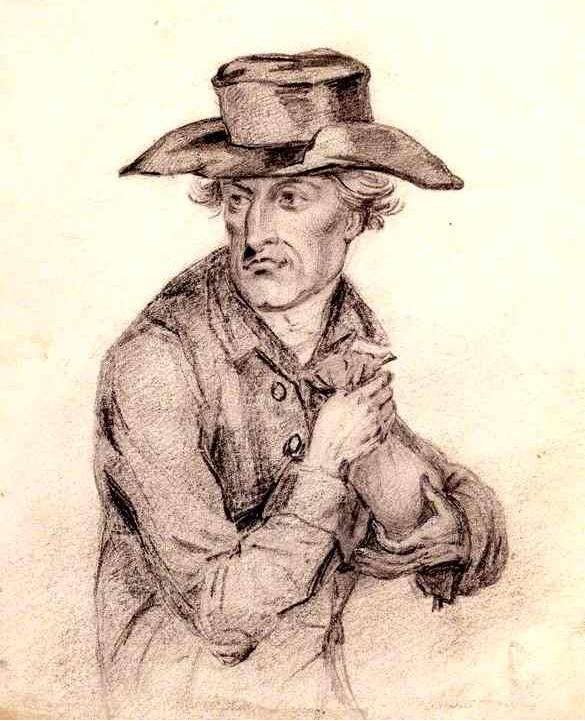
A pencil drawing of Daniel Dancer by Richard Cooper Jr, 1790s

Jemmy Taylor's name also appears in the list of notable misers that Mr Boffin enumerates. He is coupled with the banker Jemmy Wood of Gloucester, a more recent miser about whom Dickens later wrote an article in his magazine All the Year Round. Others include John Little (who appears in Merryweather), Reverend Mr Jones of Blewbury (also in Merryweather) and Dick Jarrel, whose surname was really Jarrett and an account of whom appeared in the Annual Register for 1806. The many volumes of this publication also figured among Mr Boffin's purchases.

Two more of the misers mentioned made their way into other literary works. John Hopkins, known as Vulture Hopkins, was the subject of a scornful couplet in the third of Alexander Pope's Moral Essays, "Of the Use of Riches":

When Hopkins dies, a thousand lights attend
The wretch who living saved a candle's end.

John Overs, with a slight change to his name, became the subject of a three-act drama by Douglas William Jerrold, John Overy or The Miser of Southwark Ferry (1828), roughly based on an incident when he feigned death to save expenses and was killed by accident.

Another public source of information about misers, in Scotland at least, was the prose broadside. One example concerns Isobel Frazer or Frizzle, who died in Stirling on 26 May 1820. Much of the broadside is taken up with detailing the contents of her three rooms, into which she had let no one enter. Not more than £8 in currency was discovered there, but she had bought and hoarded many articles of dress over the years, although rarely wearing them. She had also carefully picked up every pin that fell in her way, till she nearly filled one hundred pincushions. In addition to much other bric-a-brac, there were a great number of buttons, which had been cut off old coats. This makes her sound more like a compulsive hoarder than the "Female Miser" that she is called in the report. The title was more deserved by Joseph MacWilliam, who was found dead of a fire on 13 June 1826. A servant whose home was a damp Edinburgh cellar without either bed, chair or table, his colleagues and neighbours claimed to have seen him in the same threadbare clothes for 15 years. After his death, property to the value of more than £3,000 was found in the cellar, some in the form of property deeds, and more in bank receipts.

Later in the 19th century there were small regional publications dealing with single individuals of local interest. Examples of such works include Frances Blair's 32-page Memoir of Margery Jackson, the Carlisle miser and misanthrope (Carlisle 1847) and in the United States the 46-page Lochy Ostrom, the maiden miser of Poughkeepsie; or the love of a long lifetime. An authentic biography of Rachel Ostrom who recently died in Poughkeepsie, N.Y., aged ninety years, apparently very poor, but really wealthy (Philadelphia 1870).

One trait of misers arising out of the accounts about them was their readiness to incur legal expenses where money was involved. Daniel Dancer was notorious for spending five shillings in an unsuccessful effort to recover three pence from a shop woman. He was also involved in a lawsuit with his equally miserly brothers when his sister died intestate, although this time he was more successful. In the same century, Margery Jackson was involved in an epic Chancery suit between 1776 and 1791 over a family inheritance. The American Hetty Green, who despite being a multimillionaire had also a reputation as a miser, involved herself in a six-year lawsuit to obtain her aunt's fortune, only to have it proved against her that she had forged the will. More modern times yield the Chinese example of an 80-year-old affronted by being called a miser in a poem by his son-in-law. Blaming his hospitalization with Parkinson's disease three years later on this, he sued his daughter for medical fees and 'spiritual compensation'.

== Misers in literature ==
=== Fables ===
There were two famous references to misers in ancient Greek sources. One was Aesop's fable of "The Miser and his Gold" which he had buried and came back to view every day. When his treasure was eventually stolen and he was lamenting his loss, he was consoled by a neighbour that he might as well bury a stone (or return to look at the hole) and it would serve the same purpose. The other was a two-line epigram in the Greek Anthology, once ascribed to Plato. In this a man, intending to hang himself, discovered hidden gold and left the rope behind him; on returning, the man who had hidden the gold hanged himself with the noose he found in its place. Both these stories were alluded to or retold in the following centuries, the most famous versions appearing in La Fontaine's Fables as L'avare qui a perdu son trésor (IV.20) and Le trésor et les deux hommes (IX.15) respectively. Yet another of La Fontaine's fables was the late addition, ""The miser and the monkey" (XII.3), used as a cautionary tale for financiers. Here a man keeps his hoard in a sea-encircled tower until a pet monkey amuses itself one day in throwing the coins out of the window.

In Asia, misers were the butt of humorous folklore. One very early cautionary tale is the Illisa Jataka from the Buddhist scriptures. This includes two stories, in the first of which a rich miser is miraculously converted to generosity by a disciple of the Buddha; following this, the Buddha tells another story of a miser whose wealth is given away when the king of the gods impersonates him, and when he tries to intervene is threatened with what will happen if he does not change his ways. Two 16th-century stories concerning misers are included among the witticisms attributed to Birbal during Mughal times. In one he extracts from a casuistical miser a fee for a poem written in his praise. In the other the miser is forced to reward a merchant who rescued his hoard from a fire with the whole of it. Arabs similarly made extensive use of misers in their literature. The most famous being the 600 page collection of anecdotes called Kitab Al Bukhala or Book of Misers by Al-Jāḥiẓ. He lived in 800 CE during the Abbasid Caliphate in Basra, making this the earliest and largest known work on the subject in Arabic literature.

When there was renewed European interest in Aesop during the early Renaissance, the Neo-Latin poet Laurentius Abstemius wrote two collections of original fables, among which appeared Avarus et poma marcescentia (The miser and the rotten apples, fable 179), published in 1499. This was eventually translated into English by Roger L'Estrange and published in his fable collection of 1692. It concerns a miser who cannot bring himself to eat the apples in his orchard until they start to go rotten. His son invites in his playmates to pick the fruit but asks them not to eat the rotten ones since his father prefers those. The 18th century French fabulist Claris de Florian was to adapt the story in his "L'avare et son fils" (The miser and his son, IV.9). In this version the miserly father hoards his apples and only eats those going rotten. His son, upon being caught raiding them, excuses himself on the grounds that he was confining himself to eating just the sound ones.

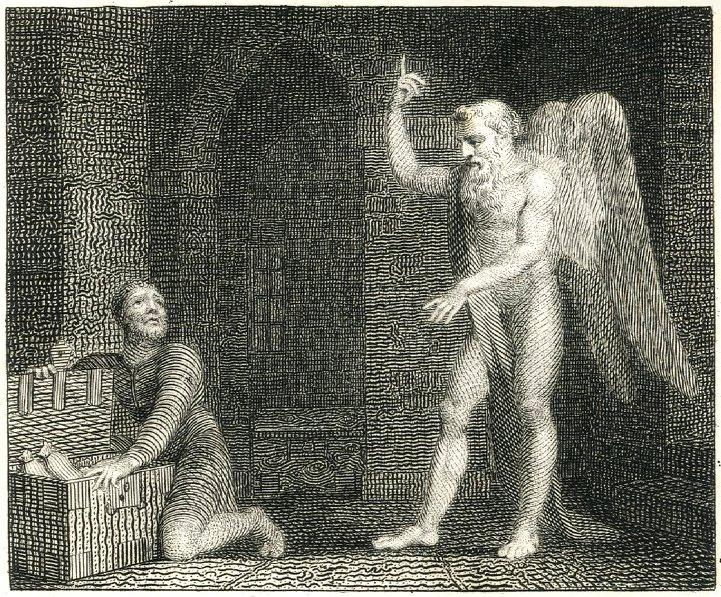
A print of John Gay's "The Miser and Plutus" by William Blake, 1793

In 18th-century Britain, when there was a vogue for creating original fables in verse, a number featured misers. Anne Finch's "Tale of the Miser and the Poet" was included among others in her 1713 Miscellany. There an unsuccessful poet meets Mammon in the guise of a miser digging up his buried gold and debates with him whether the life of wit and learning is a better calling than the pursuit of wealth. Eventually the poet is convinced that keeping his talent hidden until it is better regarded is the more prudent course. It was followed by John Gay's "The Miser and Plutus", published in his collection of fables in 1737. A miser frightened for the security of his hoard denounces gold as the corruptor of virtue and is visited by the angry god of wealth, who asserts that not gold but the attitude towards it is what damages the personality.

While these are more or less original interpretations of the theme, French fabulist Antoine Houdar de la Motte harks back to the light-hearted approach of the Greek Anthology in "The Miser and Minos", first published in his fables of 1719. Descending to the Classical underworld at his death, the miser is brought before the judge of the dead and is given the extreme punishment of returning to earth to witness how his wealth is now being spent. The Scottish poet Allan Ramsay adapted this into dialect two years later, and Charles Denis provided a version in standard English in his Select Fables (1754), reversing the title to "Minos and the Miser".

=== Poetry ===
Misers are frequent figures of fun in the epigrams of the Greek Anthology. It is charged of them that they are not masters of their own money if they do not spend it. Niarchus tells of one who does not commit suicide because of the cost of the rope to do so; Lucillius tells of another who dies because funeral expenses are cheaper than calling in a doctor. Elsewhere in the anthology is another epigram by Lucillius of a miser's encounter with a mouse that assures him he only wants lodging, not board. In one more, a miser dreams that he is in debt and hangs himself.

The Latin writer Horace put miserly behaviour at the centre of the first poem in his first collection of satires, dealing with extremes of behaviour. In writing an imitation of it, an English poet who provides only his surname, Minshull, was to emphasise this by titling his work The Miser, a Poem (London, 1735).

In Dante Alighieri's Inferno, misers are put in the fourth circle of hell, in company with spendthrifts as part of their mutual punishment. They roll weights representing their wealth, constantly colliding and quarreling.

During the 16th century, emblem books began using an illustration of an ass eating thistles as symbol of miserly behaviour, often with an accompanying poem. They appeared in various European languages, among them the illustrated trencher by Marcus Gheeraerts the Younger, dating from about 1630, on which an ass laden with rich foods is shown cropping a thistle, surrounding which is the quatrain:

The Asse which dainty meates doth beare
And feedes on thistles all the yeare
Is like the wretch that hourds up gold
And yet for want doth suffer cold.

In the third book of The Faerie Queene, Edmund Spenser created a portrait of a man trapped between conflicting desires in Malbecco, who appears in cantos 9–10. He is torn between his miserliness and love for his wife Hellenore. Wishing to escape with a lover, she sets fire to his storeroom and forces him to choose between them:

Ay when to him she cryde, to her he turnd,
And left the fyre; love money overcame:
But when he marked how him money burnd,
He left his wyf; money did love disclame.

Eventually losing both, he becomes the embodiment of frustrated jealousy.

The 18th century, so culturally rich in miser lore, furnished some notable poetic examples. Allan Ramsay's "Last speech of a wretched miser" dates from 1728 and is written in modified Scots dialect. The miser bids farewell to his riches in a comic monologue and details some of his shifts to avoid expense. Alexander Pope created another masterly portrait in the character of Cotta in his Epistle to Bathurst (1733). Reluctance to spend confines this aristocrat to his ancestral hall, where he refuses to engage with the world. Later in the century another Scottish poet, William Stevenson (1719–83), included nine satirical epitaphs on misers among his collected works, of which the last begins:

A miser rots beneath this mould'ring stone,
Who starv'd himself through spleen to skin and bone,
Lest worms might riot on his flesh at last
And boast, what he ne'er could, a full repast.

Poetic titles from the 19th century include the Irish Arthur Geoghegan's The Old Miser and Mammon: an Incident Poem (Newry 1818) and Frederick Featherstone's New Christmas Poem entitled The Miser's Christmas Eve (1893). There was also an anonymous didactic poem titled The Miser (London 1831). Although miserly behaviour is referenced during the course of its 78 pages, the real focus there is the attraction of money in all its manifestations.

=== Broadside ballads ===
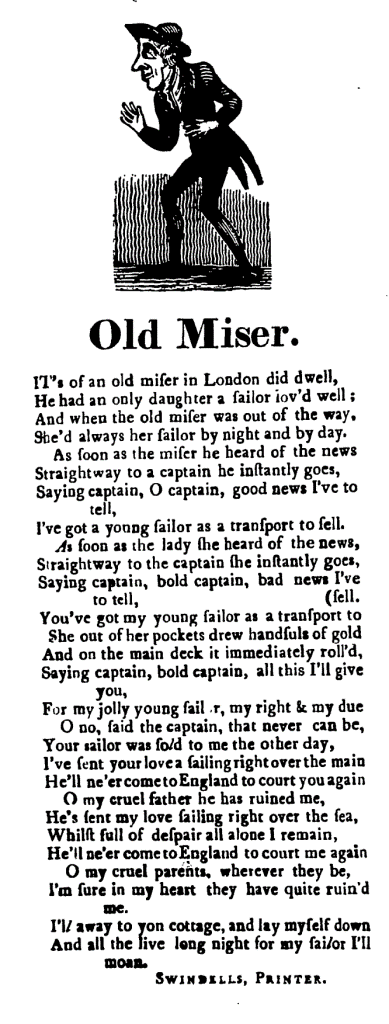
The broadside ballad of "The Old Miser", early 19th century

In the realm of popular poetry, there were a range of narrative broadside ballads concerning misers from the 17th century onward. Some of the earliest deal with the grain speculators who caused such suffering to the poorest. A representative example is "The Wretched Miser" (1682), prefaced as "a brief Account of a covetous Farmer, who bringing a Load of Corn to Market, swore the Devil should have it before he would take the honest Market price". The devil closes with the bargain and on accounting day carries off the farmer as well. The social message is carried by the refrain that follows each stanza: "O Farmers, covetous Farmers,/ why would you pinch the Poor?" The religious aspect is dealt with in the contemporary "A Looking-glass for a covetous Miser" by Thomas Jordan. Here a West Country entrepreneur and a poor husbandman debate the respective merits of anxious profit-making and contentment. The miser laments the current low price of grain and resolves not to sell or plant more until the price rises. The theme continued into the early 19th century, where a farmer is again the subject of "The life and awful death of a rich miser ".

Another common subject of these ballads was the dilemma of the miser's daughter unable to marry the man of her choice and the stratagems employed to overcome her father. In "Bite Upon the Miser", printed in the late 18th century, a sailor dresses up as the devil and scares the miser and the parson he intended as her husband into allowing the match. Much the same situation occurs in "The Politic Lovers or the Windsor Miser Outwitted", where it is a butcher who impersonates the devil and scares the miser into handing over his riches. In about 1800 there appeared an English broadside ballad called "The old miser" which was to serve as basis for what grew into a folk song with multiple versions. The scene is set in London, where a miser's daughter is courted by a sailor and the father arranges for him to be press-ganged to get him out of the way. As well as persisting in England, there are also versions in the US and Tristan de Cunha. Misers were notorious tricksters, so ingenuity transcending barely credible impersonations was generally needed. "Bite upon bite or the miser outwitted by the country lass" (1736–63) does not feature the miser's daughter but another sort of damsel in distress. A girl bears a child out of wedlock and is advised by her mother to name it Maidenhead and offer it for sale. A rich miser closes the bargain and is eventually forced to support the child by the magistrate.

Still another ballad theme was the privations of the miser's servant, a comic situation in drama and fiction also, and here principally concerned with how little food the household has to live on. One example is "The Miser's Man (dating from between 1863 and 1885). At the start of the 19th century, the theme had figured as an episode in Robert Anderson's "Croglin Watty". A simple-minded countryman down from the fells, Watty was hired by the real-life Carlisle miser Margery Jackson (1722–1812) and served her for a quarter. The ballad mixes sung verses with prose description, both in Cumberland dialect:

Neist my deame she e'en starv'd me, that niver liv'd weel;
Her hard words and luiks wou'd ha'e freeten'd the deil:

She hed a lang beard, for aw t' warl leyke a billy goat, wi' a kil-dried frosty feace: and then the smawest leg o' mutton in aw Carel market sarrad the cat, me, and hur for a week.

Dame Margery is not named in the poem because at the time of writing (1805) she was still alive and known to be litigious. We know that it is meant to be her from the fact that in William Brown's painting of the ballad, "Hiring Croglin Watty at Carlisle Cross", it is she who figures in the foreground. About 1811, just before her death, Brown had already devoted another painting to her alone as she tramped through the town. That she is still amusedly remembered there is witnessed by the modern Miser! The Musical (2011), based on her life.

=== Drama ===
Misers were represented onstage as comic figures from Classical times. One of the earliest appears in the comic Phlyax plays developed in the Greek colonies in Italy during the 4th century BCE, which are known only from rare fragments and titles. They were also popularly represented on Greek vases, often with the names of the characters written above them. In one of these by Asteas two men are depicted robbing a miser. At the centre the miser Charinos has settled for sleep on top of his strongbox in the comfort of two blankets. He is rudely awoken by two rascals mishandling him in an effort to lay their hands on his riches. On the left, Gymnilos has already pulled away the blanket on top of him while, on the right, Kosios drags out the blanket beneath. On the far right, the miser's slave Karion stands with outstretched arms and knocking knees.

Such stock figures eventually provided inspiration for the Latin dramas of Plautus. The character of Euclio in his Aulularia was to be particularly influential, as was the complicating subplot of a marriageable daughter. One of the earliest Renaissance writers to adapt the play was the Croatian Marin Držić in about 1555, whose Skup (The Miser) is set in Dubrovnik. Ben Jonson adapted elements from Plautus for his early comedy The Case is Altered (c. 1597). The miser there is the Milanese Jaques de Prie, who has a (supposed) daughter, Rachel. Pieter Corneliszoon Hooft and Samuel Coster followed with their very popular Dutch comedy Warenar (1617). The play is named from the miser, whose daughter is Claartje. Molière adapted Plautus' play into French as L'Avare (The Miser, 1668) while in England Thomas Shadwell adapted Molière's work in 1672 and a version based on both Plautus and Molière was produced by Henry Fielding in 1732. Among later adaptations there was Vasily Pashkevich's 18th-century Russian comic opera The Miser and pioneering dramatic works in Arabic by Marun Al Naqqash (1817–55) and in Serbian by Jovan Sterija Popović.

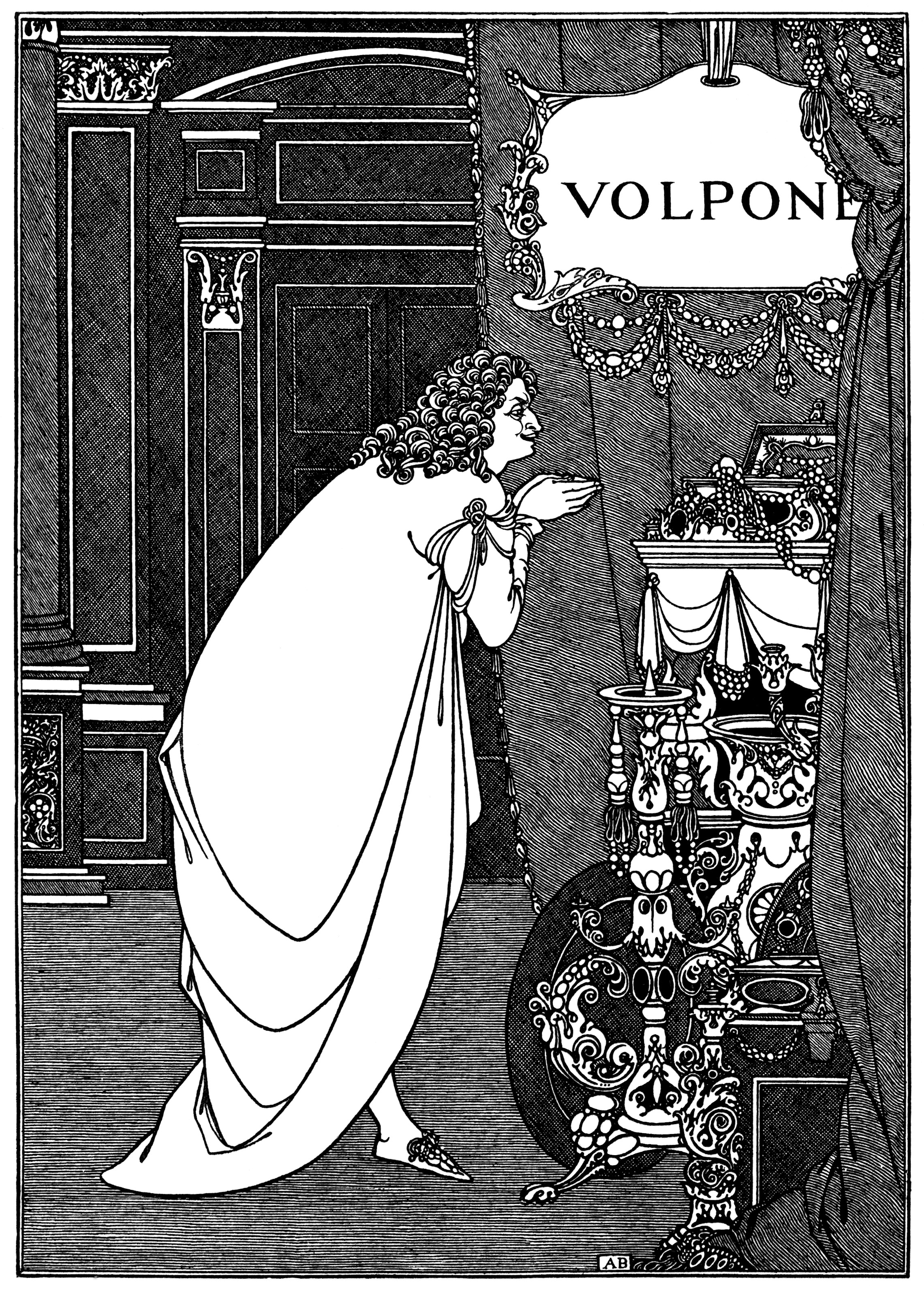
Aubrey Beardsley's 1898 title page for Ben Jonson's play Volpone

There were also independent dramatic depictions of misers, some of them being variations of the Pantaleone figure in 16th-century Italian commedia dell'arte. He is represented as a rich and miserly Venetian merchant, later to become the father of Columbina. The Venetian characters who reappear in English drama include the Jewish moneylender Shylock in William Shakespeare's The Merchant of Venice (1598) and the title character of Ben Jonson's Volpone (1606). In Aubrey Beardsley's title page for the latter, Volpone is shown worshiping his possessions, in illustration of the lines from the play, "Dear Saint, / Riches, the dumb god that giv'st all men tongues." A similar scene takes place in the second act of Alexander Pushkin's short tragedy Skupoi rytsar (1836). This concerns a son, Albert, kept short of funds by his father, the Baron. Under the title The Miserly Knight, it was made an opera by Sergei Rachmaninoff in 1906. In the corresponding act in the latter, the Baron visits his underground storehouse, where he gloats at a new addition to his coffers and moodily contemplates the extravagance of his son during a 15-minute solo.

Following on from the continuing success of Molière's L'Avare, there was a spate of French plays dealing with misers and their matrimonial plans over the next century and a half. What complicates matters is that several of these had the same title but were in fact separate plays written by different authors. L'Avare Amoureux (The Miser in Love) by Jean du Mas d' Aigueberre (1692–1755) was a one-act comedy acted in Paris in 1729. It is not the same as the anonymous one-act comedy of the same title published in 1777.

Another set of plays borrows a title from the Italian dramatist Carlo Goldoni, who was working in France at the end of his life. He had already produced a one-act comedy titled L'avaro (The Miser) in Bologna in 1756. In 1776 he produced in France the five-act L' avare fastueux (The Spendthrift Miser). The same title was used by L. Reynier for his five-act verse drama of 1794 and by Claude Baron Godart d'Aucourt de Saint Just (1769–1826) for his three-act verse drama of 1805.

The early 19th century saw misers become the subject of the musicals then fashionable in France. Eugène Scribe and Germain Delavigne collaborated on L'avare en goguette (The miser's spree) in 1823, while Jean-François Bayard and Paul Duport collaborated on the two-act La fille de l'avare (The Miser's Daughter) in 1835. The latter play was freely adapted in 1835 by John G. Millingen under the title of The Miser's Daughter. Two further adaptations of the French play were to follow later: Love and Avarice (1859) by J. V. Bridgeman (1819–89), and John Palgrave Simpson's Daddy Hardacre in 1857. Meanwhile, William Harrison Ainsworth's period novel The Miser's Daughter (first serialised in 1842) was spawning a fresh crop of dramas of that title. Two were played in 1842 and a further adaptation called Hilda in 1872. A similarly titled play was the five-act comedy partially in verse, The Miser's Daughter or The Lover's Curse of 1839, a schoolboy indiscretion of the future controversial churchman, Rev.John Purchas. And on the other side of the Atlantic there was a stage production of Julietta Gordini:The Miser's Daughter, a verse play in five acts, which claimed to derive its plot 'from an Italian story'.

Douglas William Jerrold's John Overy or The Miser of Southwark Ferry, (1828) also brings in a daughter whom the miser attempts to sell off as a mistress to her disguised lover. Earlier Jerrold had written a one-act farce, The Smoked Miser or The Benefit of Hanging (1823), in which a miser tries to marry off his ward to advantage. Another farce produced in Canada, Major John Richardson's The Miser Outwitted (1841), had an Irish theme and dealt with a plot to trick a miser out of his money. The later Thomas Peckett Prest's The Miser of Shoreditch or the Curse of Avarice (1854) was based on a penny dreadful story by him; later he adapted it as a two-act romantic drama set in time of Henry VIII.

The popularity of these theatrical misers is evident from the number of paintings and drawings based on them, many of which were then adapted as prints. In 18th-century England, it was Fielding's "The Miser" that attracted most attention. Samuel Wale's drawing of the second act was also made into a print. But it was principally depictions of various actors in the character of Lovegold, the play's anti-hero, which attracted artists. Samuel De Wilde pictured William Farren in the role at the Theatre Royal, Bath. Several other works became plates in one or another book dedicated to English drama. James Roberts II (1753 – c. 1810) executed a pen and ink watercolour of Edward Shuter in character which was adapted as a print for the six-volume play collection, Bell's British Theatre. Charles Reuben Ryley made a print of Thomas Ryder in the role for Lowndes' British Theatre (1788), while Thomas Parkinson's painting of Richard Yates as Lovegold was adapted for the 1776 edition of that work. In the following century, Thomas Charles Wageman's dramatic head and shoulders drawing of William Farren as Lovegold illustrated William Oxberry's collection of texts, The New English Drama (1820). From this time too dates the coloured print of Samuel Vale acting the part of Goliah Spiderlimb, the comic servant in Jerrold's The Smoked Miser.

Molière's L'Avare was not altogether eclipsed in England by the work adapted from it. A drawing by William Hogarth of the play's denouement was included as a print in the translation of Molière's work and prints based upon it were made by various other engravers. William Powell Frith devoted one of his theatrical paintings to a scene from L'Avare in 1876 while the French actor Grandmesnil in the role of Harpagon was painted by Jean-Baptiste François Desoria.

In addition, the challenging and complex part of Shylock was favoured by English artists. Johann Zoffany painted Charles Macklin in the role that had brought him fame at the Covent Garden Theatre (1767–68) and Thomas Gray portrayed a confrontation between Shylock and his daughter Jessica (1868). Character portraits of other actors in Shylock's role have included Henry Urwick (1859–1931) by Walter Chamberlain Urwick (1864–1943), Herbert Beerbohm Tree by Charles Buchel and Arthur Bourchier, also by Buchel.

=== Fiction ===
Characterisation of misers has been a frequent focus in prose fiction:

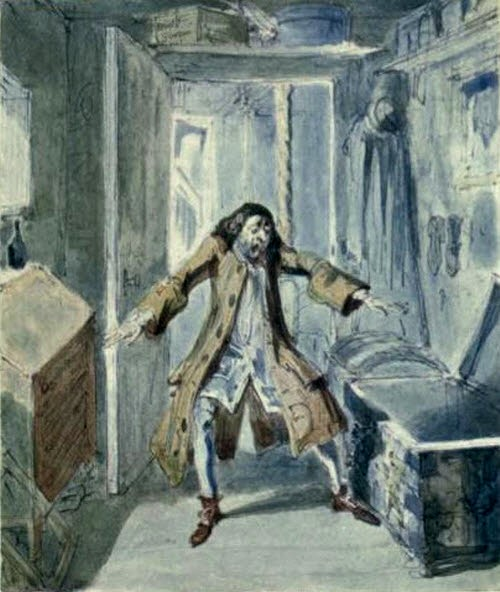
The miser discovers the loss of his money, George Cruickshank's 1842 illustration for Ainsworth's The Miser's Daughter

- The miserly priest who was Lazarillo de Tormes' second master in the Spanish picaresque novel published in 1554.
- Yan Jiansheng in an episode of The Scholars by Wu Jingzi (吳敬梓), written about 1750. This miser was unable to die easily until a wasteful second wick was removed from the lamp at his bedside.
- Jean-Esther van Gobseck – an affluent usurer in the novel Gobseck (1830) by Balzac.
- Felix Grandet – whose daughter is the title character in the novel Eugénie Grandet (1833) by Balzac.
- Fardarougha Donovan in the Irish William Carleton's Fardarougha the Miser (1839).
- John Scarve – in the novel The Miser's Daughter (1842) by William Harrison Ainsworth.
- Ebenezer Scrooge – the lead character of A Christmas Carol (1843) by Charles Dickens. He may have been partly based on John Elwes. The story has been adapted many times for stage and screen.
- Mr. Prokharchin – title character of the short story Mr. Prokharchin (1846) by Fyodor Dostoyevsky.
- Uncle Jan and his nephew Thijs in Hendrik Conscience's novel of Flemish peasant life, De Gierigaard (1853, translated into English as "The Miser" in 1855).
- Silas Marner – title character of George Eliot's novel Silas Marner (1861), who eventually abandons his avaricious ways.
- Ebenezer Balfour the villain of Robert Louis Stevenson's Kidnapped (1886), which is set during the Jacobite disturbances in 18th-century Scotland. Attempting to deprive his nephew David (the hero of the novel) of his inheritance, he arranges to have the young man kidnapped.
- Francisco Torquemada, the main character in Perez Galdós' Torquemada en la hoguera (Toquemada on the pire, 1889). The novel is centred on a Madrid moneylender who had appeared incidentally in earlier novels of his and now had three more devoted to him: Torquemada en la cruz (Toquemada on the cross, 1893), Torquemada en el purgatorio (Toquemada in Purgatory, 1894) and Torquemada y San Pedro (Torquemada and Saint Peter, 1895). All of these deal with Spanish social trends in the closing years of the 19th century.
- Trina McTeague, the miserly wife in McTeague: a story of San Francisco (1899) by Frank Norris. As avarice slowly overtakes her, she withdraws her savings so that she can gloat over the money and even roll about in it. The book was the basis for a silent film in 1916 and Erich von Stroheim's Greed in 1924. More recently, it was also the basis for William Bolcom's opera McTeague (1992).
- Henry Earlforward in Arnold Bennett's novel Riceyman Steps (1923), who makes life miserable for the wife who married him in the hope of security.
- Séraphin Poudrier, the central figure in Claude-Henri Grignon's Un Homme et son péché (1933). This French-Canadian novel was translated into English as "The Woman and the Miser" in 1978. Set at the end of the 19th century, the novel broke with the convention of extolling rural life and depicts a miser who mistreats his wife and lets her die because calling in a doctor would cost money. There have been adaptations for stage, radio, TV and two films, of which the most recent was Séraphin: un homme et son péché (2002), titled Séraphin: Heart of Stone in the English-language version.

There were beside many other prolific and once popular novelists who addressed themselves to the subject of miserliness. For the most part theirs were genre works catering to readers in the circulating libraries of the 19th century. Among them was the gothic novel The miser and his family (1800) by Eliza Parsons and Catherine Hutton's The miser married (1813). The latter was an epistolary novel in which Charlotte Montgomery describes her own romantic affairs and in addition those of her mother, an unprincipled spendthrift who has just married the miser of the title. Another female novelist, Mary E. Bennett (1813–99), set her The Gipsy Bride or the Miser's Daughter (1841) in the 16th century. Mary Elizabeth Braddon's Aurora Floyd (1863) was a successful sensation novel in which banknotes rather than gold are the object of desire and a motive for murder. It was dramatised the same year and later toured the US; in 1912 it was made a silent film. Later examples include Eliza Lynn Linton's Paston Carew, Millionaire and Miser (1886); Miser Farebrother (1888) by Benjamin Leopold Farjeon; and Dollikins and the Miser (1890) by the American Frances Eaton. In 1904 Jerome K. Jerome created Nicholas Snyders, The Miser of Zandam in a sentimental story of the occult in which the Dutch merchant persuades a generous young man to exchange souls with him.

== Misers in art ==
Death and the Miser by Hieronymus Bosch in 1494

Mediaeval art works of Christian origin take a clear moral stance on the sin of avarice in its various manifestations. The frieze on the west wall of Lincoln Cathedral depicts the torments of Hell visited on those guilty of this sin, while Sassetta made "The Blessed Ranieri showing the friars the soul of the Miser of Citerna carried to hell by demons" a panel of an altarpiece (now in the Louvre). But the bracketing of the miser and the usurer as equally culpable types, mentioned earlier, makes it difficult to interpret the subject of later moralistic paintings, since they may represent either a hoarder, a money lender or even a tax collector.

Such paintings cluster into recognisable genres, all of which point to the sinful nature of preoccupation with money for its own sake. Hieronymus Bosch's panel of Death and the Miser, dating from the 1490s, started a fashion in depicting this subject among Low Countries artists. Bosch shows the miser on his deathbed, with various demons crowding about his possessions, while an angel supports him and directs his attention to higher things. The link between finance and the diabolical is also drawn by another Fleming, Jan Matsys, in his portrayal of the man of affairs being assisted in his double bookkeeping by a demon. The same connection is made in "The devil and the usurer" in the Valenciennes Musée des beaux-arts, formerly attributed to Pieter Bruegel the Younger, in which two devils pluck at the sleeve of a poorly dressed moneylender.

The Gospel Parable of the Rich Fool lies behind another series of paintings which stem ultimately from mediaeval illustrations of the Dance of Death. There a skeleton compels those from all walks of life, but particularly types of the rich and the powerful, to join him in his dance to the grave. In 1538 Hans Holbein the Younger initiated a popular treatment of this subject in which each type is separately illustrated, of which there were many imitations in succeeding centuries. Among the depictions is a man starting up in protest behind a table piled with wealth on which a skeleton is laying hands. In his print of 1651, Wenceslas Hollar makes the connection with the parable clear by quoting from it in the frame. A variation is provided by Jan Provoost's 16th century diptych in which death confronts the man of affairs with his own account. A century later, Frans Francken the Younger treats the theme twice, in both versions of which a skeleton serenades a luxuriously dressed greybeard sitting at a table. Another curious variation occurs in Pieter Quast's print of "The Miser and Death" (1643). Here the man sits at table clasping his money bags while contemplating a skull wearing a plumed hat, beside which is an hour-glass. The visitation of death is carried forward in the 19th century in similarly titled works. They include a portrayal by Franz Häussler (1845-1920) of an old man standing at his desk who peers round fearfully as he glimpses a skull reflected in a mirror. The charcoal and watercolour drawing by the Austrian Albert Plattner (1869–1919) is more ambiguous and has the figures facing away from each other in a cramped space.

Yet another genre was the Allegory of Avarice, of which one of the earliest examples is Albrecht Dürer's painting of a naked old woman with a sack of coins (1507). This makes the point that age comes to all and confiscates all consolations. A woman is chosen as subject because the Latin avaritia is of the feminine gender. Low Countries artists who took up the allegorical theme added the variation of making the woman examine a coin by the light of a candle or lantern, as in the paintings by Gerrit van Honthorst and Mathias Stomer. In his own allegorical treatment, Paulus Moreelse made the link with the dance of death genre by introducing a young boy slyly fingering the coins while keeping a wary eye on the woman to see if she has noticed. These Dutch variations were mostly painted during the 1620s, when Rembrandt too borrowed the imagery, but his candlelit examiner of a coin is male and the piece is variously titled "The Money Changer" or "The Rich Fool", in reference to the parable already mentioned. Jan Steen, on the other hand, makes his subject very obviously a miser who hugs a small sack of coins and holds one up for intent inspection.

In the Hieronymus Bosch Death and the Miser, the pull between spirituality and materialism is highlighted by making the deathbed a scene of conflict between the angel and demons. Quentin Matsys suggests the same polarity in his The moneylender and his wife (1514). Here the woman is studying a religious book while her husband is testing coins by weight. In the hands of the later Marinus van Reymerswaele the contrast disappears. The wife of his moneylender is shown helping with the bookkeeping and leaning sideways, as mesmerised as her husband by the pile of coins. Gillis van Tilborch's painting of much the same scene is titled The Misers and again demonstrates the ambivalent targets of the moral message. The only difference is that the couple engaged in inspecting their money are old, as was the case in all the allegories of avarice. David Teniers the Younger depicted a couple similarly engaged in 1648 which was later engraved in France by Pierre-François Basan under the title Le plaisir des vieillards (the pleasures of old age). Verses as the bottom underline the moral: "Why do you make/ such piles of gold?/ Soon you'll grow old/ and Death takes all.

Another area of ambivalence centres on the kind of clothes worn by the so-called misers. The subject of Hendrik Gerritsz Pot's painting from the 1640s in the Uffizi is fashionably dressed and wearing a ring. He may be inspired by the wealth and jewelry piled on his table, but he obviously has no objection to advertising his well-to-do status. On the other hand, the Miser Casting His Accounts presented by Jan Lievens is poorly dressed and his interest in hoarding is indicated by the way he gloats on the key that will lock his money away. The same dichotomy occurs in later centuries. Jean-Baptiste Le Prince's miser is also richly robed as he sits surrounded by his possessions, while Theodore Bernard Heuvel's miser sits on the chest containing his hoard and looks anxiously over his shoulder. Paul Gavarni's miser shows much the same apprehension as he leans on the table where his money is piled and glances round suspiciously.

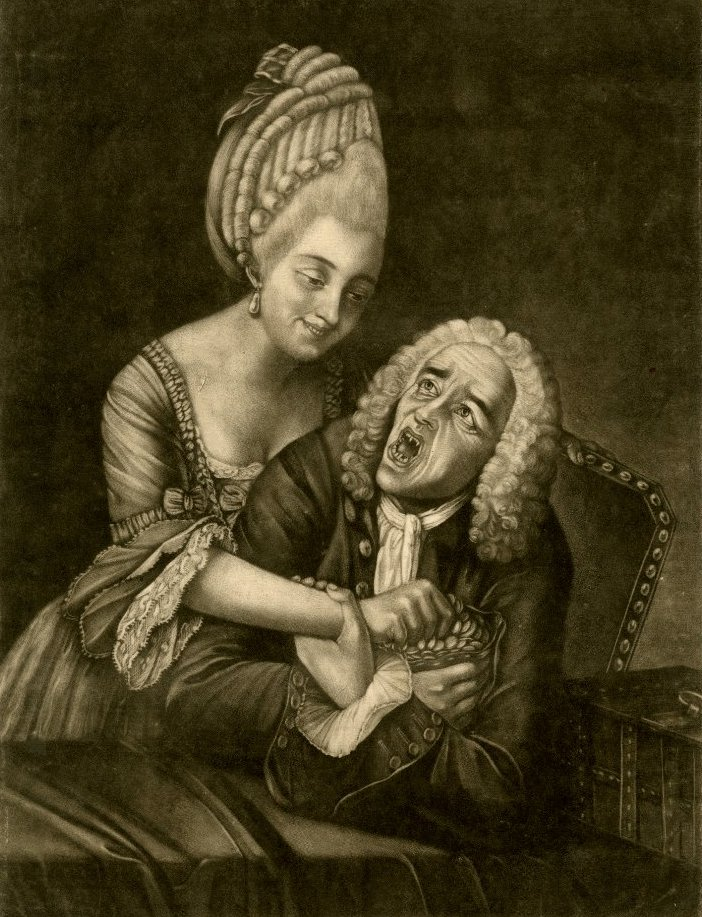
Old Gripus plundered by his young wife (1773)

A sub-theme of this kind of contrast occurred in Hans Holbein the Younger's "The Miser and his Mistress". There a young woman in luxuriant Renaissance dress stands behind an ugly miser, reaching across him to take coins from the money bags he clutches to his chest, while he looks up at her, crying out with a grimace and trying to push away her hand. An updated version by Philip Dawe was published as a print in 1773 under the title of The Scramble, or Old Gripus plunder'd by his Young Wife. Underneath is a verse commentary:

How hard is the conflict, yet claims ridicule,
When doting and avarice possess an old fool!
His wife while she plunders with smiles and caresses,
At once cools his love and his avarice distresses.

Literary manifestations of the theme of the mismatched couple include the Malbecco episode in "The Faerie Queene" and Catherine Hutton's novel "The Miser Married".

English depictions of misers in the 18th century begin as genre paintings. Gainsborough Dupont's poorly dressed character clutches a bag of coin and looks up anxiously in the painting in the Ashmolean Museum. John Cranch (1751-1821) pictures two armed desperadoes breaking in on his. However, it is in the realm of satirical prints that the most inventiveness is found. James Gillray does not neglect the moral dimension either in his "The miser's feast" (1786). He is pictured seated at a table eating a meager meal, attended by Death in the guise of an emaciated and naked manservant holding in his right hand a tray with a bone on it and behind him, in his left hand, the dart of death. Famine, a withered hag naked to the waist, is also in attendance wearing a large hat and fashionable skirt. These characters are identified by the verse at the bottom: "What else can follow but destructive fate,/When Famine holds the cup and Death the plate?"

Among other details in Gillray's crowded print is a fashionably dressed prostitute coming through the door. Lechery was supposed to be an attribute of some misers, exposing them to a contest between satisfying this weakness and their overmastering passion to save expense, as exemplified in the Old Gripus print. Thomas Rowlandson points to one solution of his dilemma in a print showing a miser engaged with two nude prostitutes whom has hired for the price of one. In another Rowlandson revisits the theme of the meager feast, depicting his miser crouched by an empty grate and keeping himself warm by hugging his money-bags. A hag enters, bringing a tiny portion to eat on a plate which a famished cat scrambles to reach. One more dichotomy explored by Rowlandson appears in his watercolour of "The spendthrift and the miser". The drunken young man alarming the miser there is probably his son, taking up a literary theme to be found, among other places, in Allan Ramsay's comic monologue. It will be remembered too that the thriftless ne'er-do-well of A Rake's Progress inherited his money from a miserly father.

By the end of the 19th century the theme of the miser was distancing itself from the simple moralities of journeyman painters and becoming a subject for aristocratic amateurs. The Empress Maria Feodorovna's miser of 1890 handles a small strongbox. The Indian Raja Ravi Varma paints a Jewish character type for his miser, dated 1901, while the Hungarian nobleman Ladislav Medňanský titles his humanised study "Shylock" (1900). Apart from them, there is an etching by James Abbott McNeill Whistler which emphasises the essential isolation of such figures. His enigmatic "The Miser" of 1860 pictures an individual of indeterminate gender seated with its back to the viewer in the corner of a bare room next to the window. He is looking down as if examining something and the room behind him is spartanly furnished with just a table and bench, while a broadsheet is tacked to the wall.
