= Scrooge (disambiguation) =

Ebenezer Scrooge is a character in Charles Dickens' 1843 novella A Christmas Carol.

Scrooge may also refer to:

- Scrooge McDuck, or Uncle Scrooge, a Disney comic and cartoon character
- Scrooge, or, Marley's Ghost, a 1901 silent film
- Scrooge (1913 film)
- Scrooge (1935 film)
- Scrooge (1951 film)
- Scrooge (1970 film), a musical
- Scrooge (musical), a 1992 stage musical
- Scrooge: A Christmas Carol, a 2022 Netflix original film
- Uncle Scrooge, a comic book started in 1952 starring Scrooge McDuck
- Scrooge effect, a psychological phenomenon of a person changing their behaviour towards increased generosity and altruism
- RT-20P (NATO reporting name: SS-15 Scrooge), an intercontinental ballistic missile developed by the Soviet Union
- Miser, a person with a character similar to Ebenezer Scrooge, such that scrooge has become a synonym

== See also ==
- Scrooge McRock, a 1997 album by Grand Buffet
- Scrooged, a 1988 film starring Bill Murray
- Ebenezer (disambiguation)
