= The Miser =

17th century French comedy by Molière

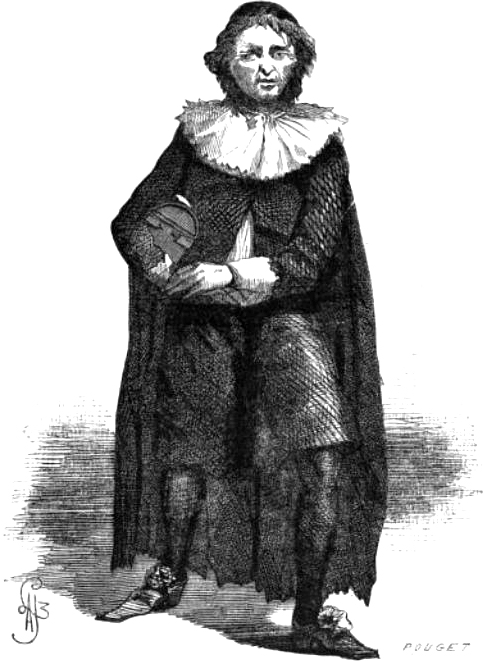
- Original language: French
- Written by: Molière
- Characters: Harpagon; Cléante; Élise; Valère; Mariane; Anselme; Frosine; Master Simon; Master Jacques; La Flèche; Mistress Claude; Brindavoine; La Merluche; A magistrate; A clerk
- Subject: Avarice
- Genre: Comedy
- Setting: Paris, in Harpagon's house

Premiere
- Date: September 9, 1668
- Place: Paris

The Miser (French: L'Avare; pronounced [lavaʁ]) is a five-act comedy in prose by the French playwright Molière. It was first performed on September 9, 1668, in the theatre of the Palais-Royal in Paris.

This is a character comedy whose main character, Harpagon, is characterised by his caricatured avarice. Harpagon is an elderly widower who wishes to have an arranged marriage to the impoverished young woman Mariane, while securing another arranged marriage for his unwilling daughter Élise. He is initially unaware that Mariane is the girlfriend of his own son, or that Élise has a boyfriend. Meanwhile, Harpagon is stubbornly protecting a cassette full of gold. When his gold is stolen, Harpagon considers the entire urban and suburban population to be suspects for the crime. The five acts comprise five, five, nine, seven and six scenes respectively.

The characters break the fourth wall by speaking to the audience, though the other characters demand to know who is being spoken to.

== The play ==
The play was first produced when Molière's company was under the protection of Louis XIV. It was loosely based on the Latin comedy Aulularia by Plautus, from which many incidents and scraps of dialogue are borrowed, as well as from contemporary Italian farces.

The miser of the title is called Harpagon, a name adapted from the term Greek: ἁρπάγη pronounced harpágay, meaning a hook or grappling iron (ἁρπάγη < ἁρπάζω = grab). He is obsessed with the wealth he has amassed and always ready to save expenses. Now a widower, he has a son, Cléante, and a daughter, Élise. Although he is over sixty, he is attempting to arrange a marriage between himself and an attractive young woman, Mariane. She and Cléante are already devoted to each other, however, and the son attempts to procure a loan to help her and her sick mother, who are impoverished.

Élise, Harpagon's daughter, is the beloved of Valère, but her father hopes to marry her to a wealthy man of his choosing, Seigneur Anselme. Meanwhile, Valère has taken a job as a steward in Harpagon's household in order to be close to Élise. The complications are only resolved at the end by the rather conventional discovery that some of the principal characters are long-lost relatives.

Satire and farce blend in the fast-moving plot, as when the miser's hoard is stolen. Asked by the police magistrate whom he suspects, Harpagon replies, “Everybody! I wish you to take into custody the whole town and suburbs” (5.1) and indicates the theatre audience while doing so. The play also makes fun of certain theatrical conventions, such as the spoken aside addressed to the audience, hitherto ignored by the characters onstage. The characters of L'Avare, however, generally demand to know who exactly is being spoken to.

== Roles and original actors ==
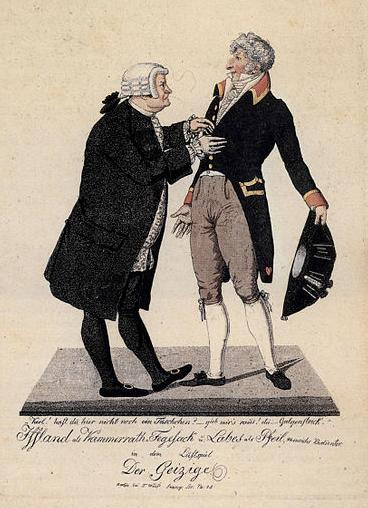
Harpagon and La Flèche in a German production of The Miser, 1810

Harpagon
Molière
The tyrannical father of Cléante and Élise Harpagon is a sexagenarian bourgeois miser whose love for his cash box exceeds that for his children. He builds his wealth by lending at usurious rate while pinching every penny at home, refusing to replace the worn-out clothes of the servants he abuses. The sexagenarian is suitor of the young Mariane, whom Cléante also wishes to marry.

Cléante
Du Croisy
Harpagon's profligate son, Cléante is also in love with Mariane. Intending to run away with her, he attempts to procure an illegal loan to provide Mariane and her ill mother with money, only to discover the lender is his own father. There is mutual resentment between the two over not only money but over love when Harpagon tricks his son into revealing his love for Mariane.

Élise
Mlle de Brie
The daughter of Harpagon, Élise owes her life to Valère, who saved her from drowning just before the beginning of the play. She opposes her father's plans to wed her to the elderly Anselme, who has agreed to take her without a dowry.

Valère
La Grange
Valère has saved Élise from drowning and has come into the employ of Harpagon with intentions to win her. Harpagon mistrusts him and suspects him of wanting to rob him. At the end it is revealed he is of noble Napolitan blood, the brother of Mariane, and the son of Anselme who is really Don Thomas D'Alburcy.

La Flèche
Louis Béjart
A servant in Harpagon's household, La Flèche helps Cléante arrange a clandestine loan through Master Simon. In a dramatic turn he digs up and steals Harpagon's cash box.

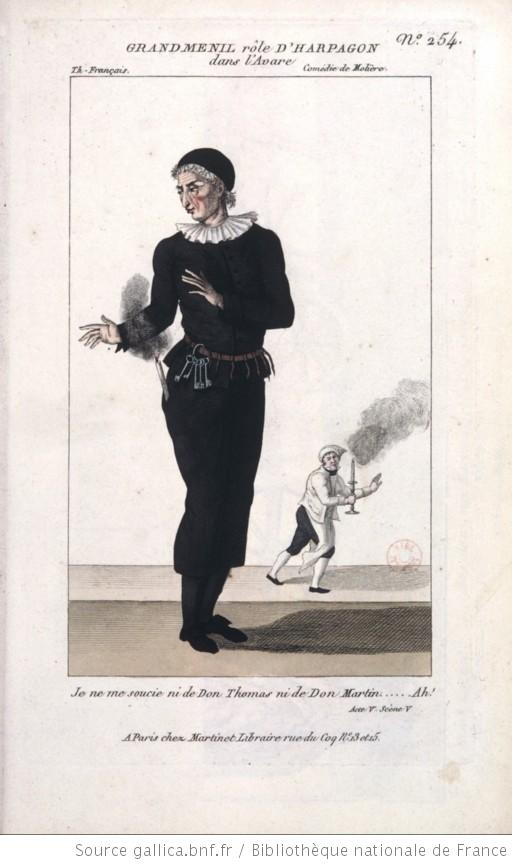
Master Jacques repeatedly relights a candle behind Harpagon's back.

Master Jacques
André Hubert
Master Jacques is cook and coachman to Harpagon.

Anselme
Mr de Brie
An elderly gentleman and suitor to Élise, Anselme is a wandering Napolitan noble who believes his wife and children drowned sixteen years earlier. At the climax it is discovered that Valère and Mariane are his children and his real name is Don Thomas D'Alburcy.

Mariane
Armande Béjart-Molière
The young woman whom Harpagon intends to wed is also the woman his son Cléante intends to run away with. She is revealed at the end to be the sister of Valère and daughter of Anselme, who is really Don Thomas D'Alburcy of Naples.

Master Simon
La Thorillière?
A dishonest character, Master Simon tries to arrange a usurious loan between Cléante and his father.

Frosine
Madeleine Béjart
Frosine is an elderly woman who acts as a go-between to ensure the marriage of Harpagon and Mariane; she convinces Harpagon that Mariane's frugality will outweigh her lack of dowry, and that Mariane loves bespectacled old men.

Harpagon's servants with minor roles include Brindavoine, La Merluche, and Mistress Claude, a cleaning woman with no lines. In the last act appears a Magistrate (Note: or Commissioner; Commissaire in French) who investigates the theft of the cash-box with his Clerk, who has no spoken part.

== Synopsis ==
Act I
La Flèche is waiting for his master in Harpagon's house. Valère explains to the audience how he has assumed the role of a servant to be closer to Élise. They met when he rescued her from drowning and they fell in love. Harpagon enters, angry with La Flèche for hanging around. He suspects him of stealing something from him. La Flèche is angry at being suspected and points out that Harpagon is so careful with his money that it would be impossible to steal it. Harpagon confides in the audience expressing anxiety about the large sum of money he has buried in the garden. As Cléante and Élise enter he is again fearful that they might have heard what he is saying about the hidden money. When they approach Harpagon thinks that they are plotting to steal from him. They are actually trying to work out how to broach the subject of marriage with him since they have both found people they want to marry. Harpagon also wants to discuss marriage with them and he mentions a young girl called Mariane. Harpagon wants to know what Cléante thinks of her. Cléante is shocked and rushes off the stage. Meanwhile, Harpagon says that Élise has to marry Seigneur Anselme. Harpagon asks Valère for his opinion on the matter. Valère is trying to suck up and agrees with Harpagon's idea. Valère reassures Élise that somehow they will sort things out later.

Act II
Cléante expresses his frustration that he and his father are rivals in love with the same woman but plans to keep his own sentiments secret while he tries to secure funds to help Mariane and her mother. Cléante has dispatched La Flèche to meet with a money-lender. Maitre Simon has acted as an intermediary between La Flèche and the money-lender until the deal is done so as to protect his identity. La Flèche explains that there are some conditions attached to the loan. Cléante is ready to accept them whatever they are, so long as he can get money to give to his beloved. When La Flèche refers to them as 'several small conditions' it is rather an understatement. Cléante is resentful but feels trapped by his desire for the money. Meanwhile, Maitre Simon enters with Harpagon discussing a young man who wants to borrow from Harpagon. Harpagon is displeased that Cléante is trying to borrow money from someone else. Cléante, dismissed by his father, expresses disgust and leaves.

Act III
The scene begins with Harpagon calling his household together to issue instructions in preparation for Mariane's arrival for dinner. When it is Master Jacques's turn, he wants to know whether he is being consulted as coachman or cook. Master Jacques insists that he can only produce excellent food if given money. Harpagon wants his carriage cleaning and horses getting ready. Mariane enters. She is shocked at how unattractive Harpagon is when they first meet and then even more shocked to be introduced to Harpagon's son, who is no other than the man with whom she is herself in love. Cléante begins complimenting her which makes Harpagon very agitated because to him, Cléante's words sound insulting and offensive. Cléante pays her compliments on his father's behalf and tells her of an expensive array of delicacies and drinks he has arranged. He then insists they takes as a present, the diamond ring on his father's hand. Harpagon becomes angry with Cléante for wasting his money, but hides his anger from Mariane. Élise arrives, is introduced to Mariane, announcing that someone has brought Harpagon some money. Harpagon quickly exits while Cléante and Élise escort Mariane on a tour of the garden.

Act IV
Harpagon sees Cléante kissing Mariane's hand and suspects that something is happening between them. Harpagon wants Cléante to tell him his feelings about Mariane. Cléante expresses a lack of interest in her. Harpagon tricks Cléante into confessing his true feelings by suggesting he is having second thoughts about taking her as his wife, and would have given her to Cléante if he thought that Cléante had any feelings for her. Through further questioning, he establishes that Cléante does feel for her and has visited her a few times. Harpagon is angered when Cléante refuses to stop loving Mariane. Master Jacques is called to judge which of them is right and wrong. On stage, he moves between Cléante and Harpagon, listening to their complaints about each other and taking back to each, the version of the response by the other party that he knows each wants to hear. As Master Jacques leaves, he brings the two men together physically on stage to show their new found accord and then leaves them to a new argument. As they make up, they promise respect and tolerance to one another and say thank you to one another for allowing the other to marry Mariane. It then becomes clear as to what has happened, and the conversation returns to the former state of anger. Harpagon tells Cléante to leave and threatens to disinherit him. La Flèche enters excitedly. He has managed to steal Harpagon's money box.

Act V
In this scene Seigneur Anselme enters. He does not want to force Élise into an unhappy marriage. Master Jacques accuses Valère of stealing Harpagon's gold. When Valère comes in he believes the crime to which Harpagon desires him to confess is the crime of stealing the love of his daughter. When Valère says that he won't deny it and he has no regrets, he refers to loving Élise but Harpagon thinks he's admitting the theft of the money. Harpagon is puzzled. He is furious with Élise for falling for Valère, especially since he believes him to be a thief. Élise tries to justify this love as Valère saved her life, but Harpagon is not interested. Valère reveals that he is the son of a man of high rank, Dom Thomas d'Alburcy from Naples. Anselme says that this cannot be true as the whole family died in a shipwreck. Valère reveals that when the ship went down, he was saved and he recently discovered his father had also survived. On his search for his father he had met, saved, and fallen for Élise and had decided the best way to be near her was to assume the role of servant. Mariane claims him as her long-lost brother. She also survived the wreck with her mother and eventually came to France. Anselme then reveals he is their father. Harpagon's first reaction is to hold Anselme responsible for the theft of his money. He shows no other emotion than greed. Harpagon is wary of letting them marry because of the cost of a wedding. However, Anselme generously offers to pay for everything. Harpagon is more bothered to find out who took his money. Cléante returns to Harpagon and negotiates with him for the right to marry Mariane in return for getting his money back.

== Sources ==
Aside from the example of contemporary misers, Molière drew from a number of ancient and contemporary sources for elements in his The Miser. The character of Harpagon draws from the Latin play Aulularia by Plautus in which the miser Euclio incessantly changes the hiding place of his pot of gold out of fear of having it stolen, and the miser's fourth-act (Note: Act IV, scene 9 in Aulularia.) monologue exaggerating the loss of his pot was the basis for Harpagon's. Also from Aulularia Molière appropriated the love affair between Élise and Valère, Harpagon's inspection of the hands of La Flèche, and Valère's avowals of love for Élise that Harpagon takes as his confession to theft. La Belle Plaideuse (1655) of François le Métel de Boisrobert furnished Molière with the father-as-usurer, and the scene in which a lender lends the borrower 15,000 francs, of which 3,000 is in goods; several of these items appear in the list in The Miser. Jean Donneau de Visé's la Mère coquette (1665) gave Molière a father and son in love with the same young woman.

== Theatrical adaptations ==
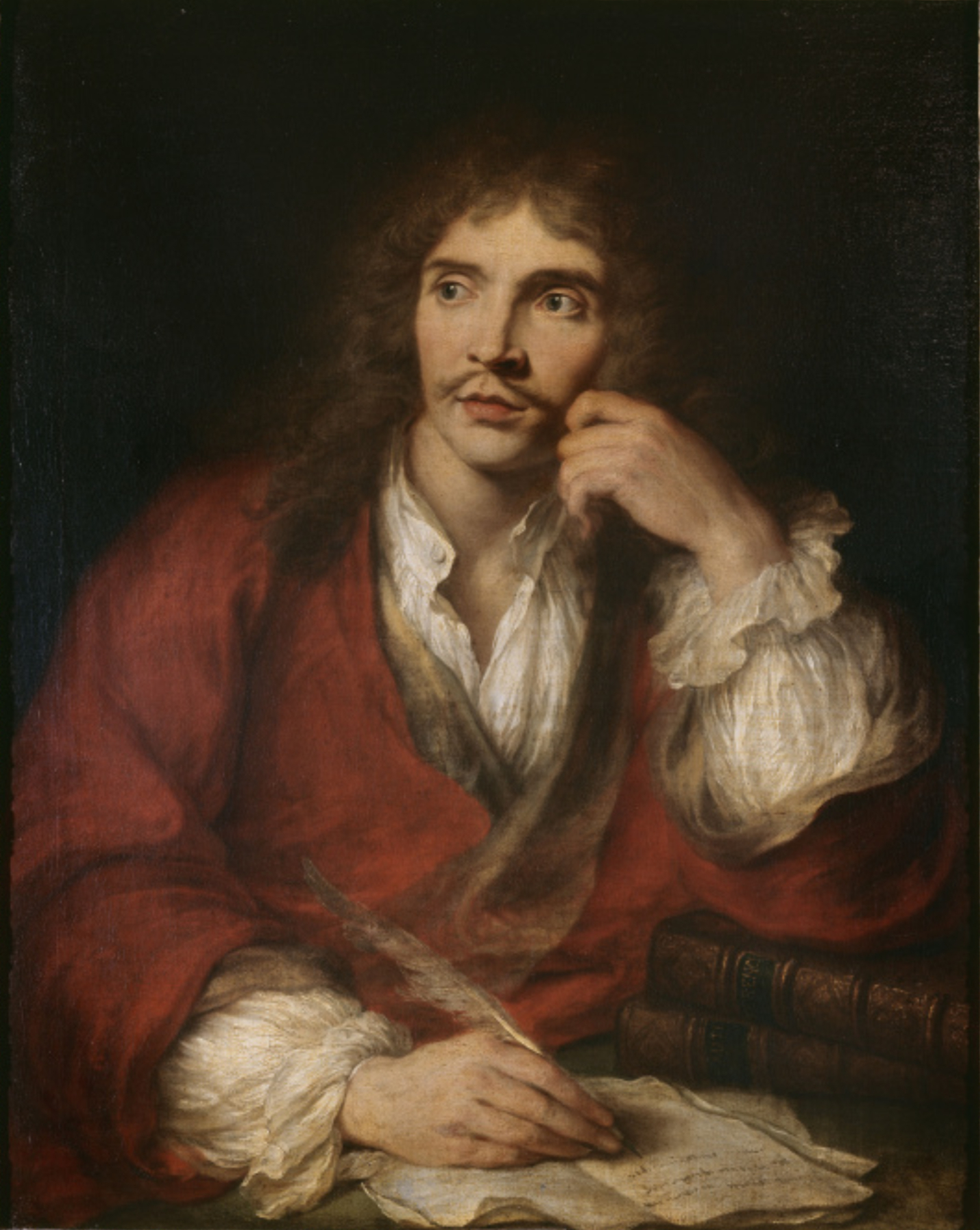
Molière, Charles-Antoine Coypel, 1730

Very soon after the play's first production in 1668, versions began to appear elsewhere in Europe. A German translation, Der Geizige, appeared in Frankfurt in 1670. In England Thomas Shadwell adapted Molière's work under the title "The Miser" in 1672 and added eight new characters. An even more popular version based on both Plautus and Molière was produced by Henry Fielding in 1732.

In Italian commedia dell'arte there was already a tradition of depicting misers as the Pantaleone figure, who was represented as a rich and avaricious Venetian merchant. However, Molière's play was eventually adapted to opera. Giovanni Bertati's libretto based on the play was set by Pasquale Anfossi as L'avaro in 1775 and in 1776 it was set again by Gennaro Astarita. Giuseppe Palomba also wrote a libretto based on the work which was set by Giacomo Cordella in 1814. In Russia, too, Vasily Pashkevich based his 18th century comic opera The Miser on Molière's play. Another musical adaptation in Arabic was pioneered by the Lebanese Marun Al Naqqash (1817–55) as al-Bakhil. This was performed in Beirut in 1847.

Jovan Sterija Popović, the founding father of Serbian theatre, based his Tvrdica (The Miser, 1837) on Molière's play. In this work, the Harpagon figure is represented as a small town Greek merchant.

One reason for so many versions must be the acknowledged fact that Molière's humour does not translate well and requires more or less free adaptation to succeed. The history of De Vrek, Taco de Beer's 1863 translation into Dutch provides another notable example. In 1878 he adapted this to Dutch contemporary life and an edition of that version found its way to Indonesia. There it was further adapted into Malay as Si Bachil and given a contemporary Indonesian background. In 1941 this production in turn served as basis for Tamar Djaja's novel of the same title, by which time the story had become all but unrecognisable.

The earliest American production of a play titled The Miser was of Fielding's version in the years following 1766. A Broadway production of a translation of Molière's play ran for only three nights at the Experimental Theatre in 1936 and there have been several revivals since in one version or another.

In 1954, The Laird o' Grippy, a free translation into Scots by Robert Kemp, was staged by the Edinburgh Gateway Company, with John Laurie in the leading role.

An audio recording of the 1969 Lincoln Center production produced by Jules Irving and directed by Carl Weber was released by Caedmon Records (TRS 338). This recording of the adaptation by Ranjit Bolt is available at the Internet Archive. The play itself ran at the Vivian Beaumont Theater for 52 performances.

An Australian musical theatre adaptation with the name Mistress Money premiered in Sydney in 1960. It had book and lyrics by Eleanor Witcombe and John McKellar and music by Dot Mendoza.

More recently in Britain, John Coutts' English-Scots version of The Miser was performed in 2009 under the title The Auld Skinflint. In 2012 the play was made into a Bollywood musical titled Kanjoos The Miser by Hardeep Singh Kohli and Jatinder Verma and toured the UK.

== Film, television and audio adaptations ==
- In 1969, Caedmon Records released a recording of The Repertory Theater of Lincoln Center's production of The Miser (TRS 338) directed on stage by Carl Weber and featuring Robert Symonds as Harpagon, Blythe Danner as Élise, David Birney as Cléante, and Lili Darvas as Frosine. The play was adapted by Ranjit Bolt.
- L'avare is a French movie from 1980, directed by and starring Louis de Funès. The play was also filmed by the Comédie-Française in 1973.
- On 29 September 1986, BBC Radio 3 broadcast an adaptation using a translation by Miles Malleson and directed by Peter Kavanaugh, with Michael Hordern as Harpagon, Eleanor Bron as Frosine, Jonathan Tafler as Cléante, Nicholas Farrell as Valère, Julia Swift as Élise, Elaine Claxton as Marianne, and Shaun Prendergast as La Flèche.
- On 2 April 1988, the BBC broadcast an updated, period adaptation to an English setting in their Theatre Night series using the Alan Drury translation, with Nigel Hawthorn as Harpagon, Jim Broadbent as Maitre Jacques, and Janet Suzman as Frosine.
- The Italian film L'avaro was made in 1990 by Tonino Cervi. There were also television adaptations in Italy (1957) and France (2006).
- An audio version of play, adapted to a modern setting and language by Barunka O'Shaugnessey and starring Toby Jones as Harpagon, aired on BBC 3 radio in 2022 for Moliere's 400th anniversary.

== Works cited ==
- Bouvier, Luc (2000). "Présentation de l'œuvre". L'Avare. Parcours d'une œuvre (in French). Beauchemin. ISBN 978-2-7616-5118-9.
- Gaines, James F., ed. (2002). The Molière Encyclopedia. Greenwood Publishing Group. ISBN 978-0-313-31255-7.
- Garreau, Joseph E. (1984). "Molière". In Stanley Hochman (ed.). McGraw-Hill Encyclopedia of World Drama: An International Reference Work in 5 Volumes. McGraw-Hill. pp. 397–418. ISBN 978-0-07-079169-5.
