= Ebenezer Scrooge =

Fictional character in A Christmas Carol

- A Christmas Carol character
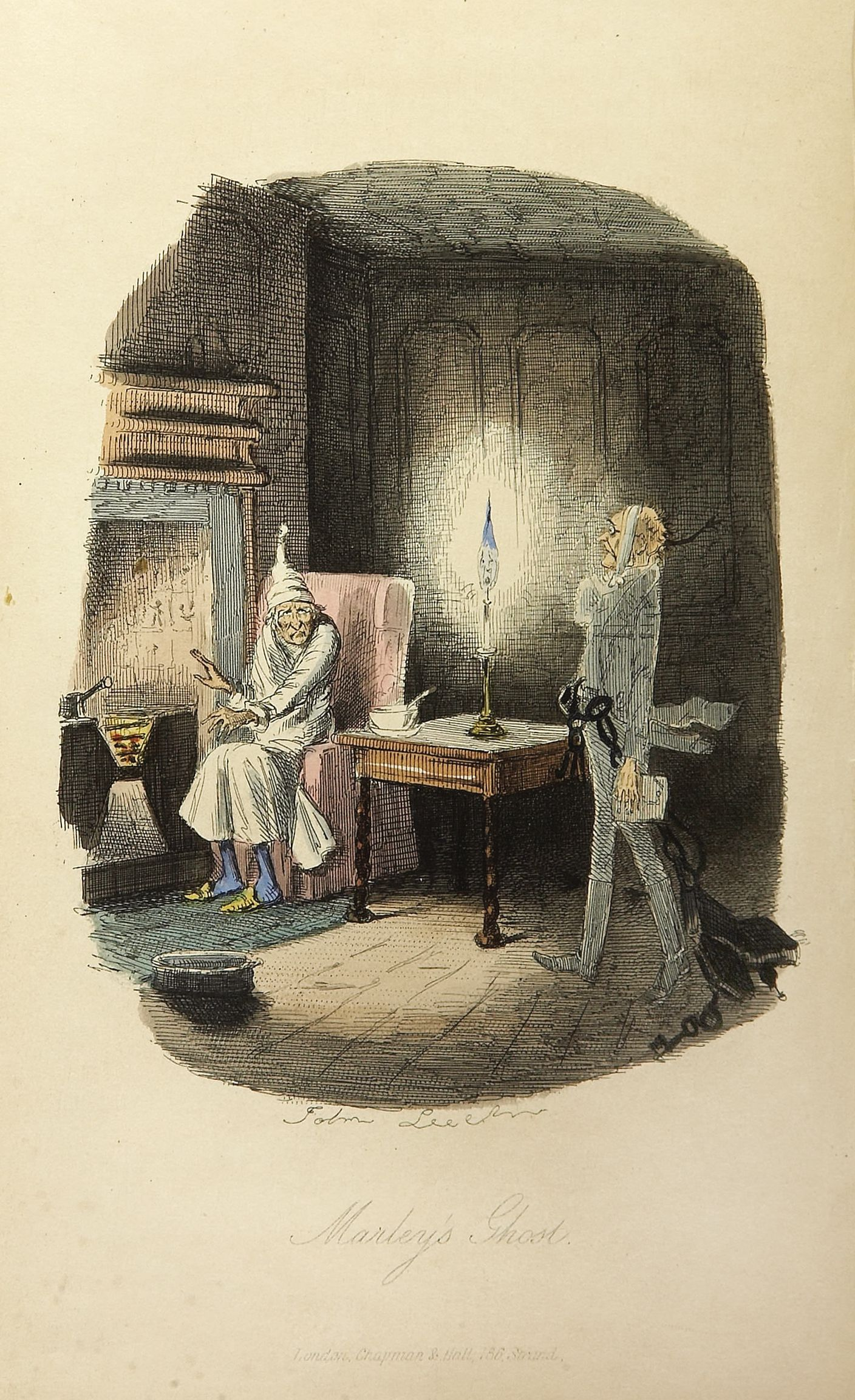
- Scrooge (left) encounters Jacob Marley's ghost
- Created by: Charles Dickens
- Based on: Possibly John Elwes, Daniel Dancer, Jemmy Wood
- Gender: Male
- Occupation: Businessman (Note: Scrooge's type of business is not directly stated in the original work. Victorian-period adaptations often depict him as a money-lender, but also as a mercantile executive (1951) or commodity trader (1984).)
- Significant other: Belle (former fiancée)
- Relatives: Fan (Fran in some adaptations) (late sister); Fred (nephew); an unnamed niece-in-law (named Clara or Bess in some adaptations)
- Nationality: English

Ebenezer Scrooge (/ˌɛ.bə.ˈniː.zər ˈskruːdʒ/) is a fictional character and the protagonist of Charles Dickens's 1843 novella A Christmas Carol. Initially a cold-hearted miser who despises Christmas, his redemption by visits from the ghost of Jacob Marley and the Ghosts of Christmas Past, Present, and Yet to Come has become a defining tale of the Christmas holiday in the English-speaking world.

Dickens describes Scrooge thus early in the story: "The cold within him froze his old features, nipped his pointed nose, shrivelled his cheek, stiffened his gait; made his eyes red, his thin lips blue; and spoke out shrewdly in his grating voice." Throughout the novella, visits from the four ghosts show Scrooge the errors of his ways, and he transforms into a better, more generous man. Scrooge's last name has entered the English language as a byword for greed and misanthropy, while his catchphrase, "Bah! Humbug!" is often used to express disgust with many modern Christmas traditions.

== Description ==
Charles Dickens describes Scrooge as "a squeezing, wrenching, grasping, scraping, clutching, covetous, old sinner! Hard and sharp as flint... secret, and self-contained, and solitary as an oyster." He does business from a Cornhill warehouse and is known among the merchants of the Royal Exchange as a man of good credit. Despite having considerable personal wealth, he underpays his clerk Bob Cratchit and hounds his debtors relentlessly while living cheaply and joylessly in the chambers of his deceased business partner, Jacob Marley. Most of all, he detests Christmas, which he associates with reckless spending. When two men approach him on Christmas Eve for a donation to charity, he sneers that the poor should avail themselves of the treadmill or the workhouses, or else die to reduce the surplus population. He also refuses his nephew Fred's invitation to Christmas dinner and denounces him as a fool for celebrating Christmas. He even frightens a young carol singer by gripping a ruler with a fit of energy. Scrooge resents giving Cratchit Christmas Day off, as there will be no business for Scrooge during the day.

That night, however, Scrooge is visited in his home by Marley's ghost, who is condemned to walk the world forever bound in chains that were forged from his greed as punishment for his inhumanity in life. Marley warns Scrooge that he will be visited by three spirits, in the hope that he will mend his ways; if he does not, Scrooge will wear even heavier chains than his in the afterlife since he's lived longer than him.

The first spirit, the Ghost of Christmas Past, shows Scrooge visions of his early life. These visions establish Scrooge's unloving childhood in a boarding school, where at Christmas he remained alone while his schoolmates returned home to their families. One of Scrooge's happy memories was when his sister Fan (Fred's mother) came to take him home one Christmas, saying that their hard-hearted father had changed. Scrooge then apprenticed at the warehouse of a jovial and generous master, Mr. Fezziwig. He and a young woman named Belle engaged to marry, but she withdrew out of distaste for his greed and married another man. The present-day Scrooge reacts to his memories with nostalgia and deep regret.

The Ghost of Christmas Present arrives and shows Scrooge that his greed and selfishness have hurt others as well, particularly Cratchit, who cannot afford to provide his desperately ill son Tiny Tim with medical treatment because of Scrooge's miserliness. The Spirit tells an ashamed Scrooge that Tiny Tim will die unless something changes, and throws back at Scrooge his own heartless words about the poor and destitute. Scrooge and the ghost also visit Fred's Christmas party, where Fred defends his uncle from his guests' snide remarks.

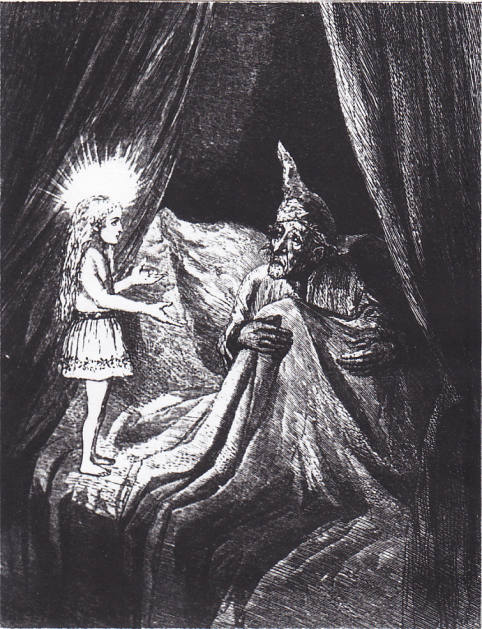
Scrooge and the Ghost of Christmas Past (Note: Illustration by Sol Eytinge Jr. (1868))

Finally, the Ghost of Christmas Yet to Come appears to Scrooge as a dark, ominous, and silent phantom of the night. The ghost shows Scrooge an eerie vision of the future being created by his own greed and selfishness: a lonely death welcomed by his debtors, a neglected grave, resentful servants stealing his belongings, and the Cratchit family devastated by the loss of Tiny Tim. Terrified at the premonition, Scrooge asks the Spirit if his future can still be altered and begs for another chance, promising to change his ways and honor Christmas in his heart. While Scrooge pleads for mercy, the ghost transforms into a bedpost. Suddenly, Scrooge wakes up and finds himself in his own bed on Christmas morning.

Overjoyed at having his wish granted, Scrooge commits to being more generous and compassionate. He accepts his nephew's invitation to Christmas dinner, provides for Cratchit and his family, and donates to charity. From then on, he is said to have become the embodiment of the Christmas spirit and a "second father" to Tiny Tim.

== Origins ==
Several theories have been put forward as to where Dickens got the inspiration for the character:

Ebenezer Lennox Scroggie was supposedly a merchant from Edinburgh who won a catering contract for King George IV's visit to Scotland. He was buried in Canongate Kirkyard, with a gravestone that is now lost. The theory is that Dickens noticed the gravestone that described Scroggie as being a " meal man" (grain merchant) but misread it as "mean man." This theory has been described as "a probable Dickens hoax" for which "no one could find any corroborating evidence". There is no record of anyone named Scroggie in the Edinburgh census returns of the period. Jemmy Wood, owner of the Gloucester Old Bank and possibly Britain's first millionaire, was nationally renowned for his stinginess, and may have been another model for Scrooge. The man whom Dickens eventually mentions in his letters and who strongly resembles the character portrayed by Dickens' illustrator, John Leech, was a noted British eccentric and miser named John Elwes (1714–1789). Another suggested inspiration for the character of Scrooge is Daniel Dancer, who Dickens mentions, along with Elwes, in Our Mutual Friend.

It has been suggested that he chose the name Ebenezer ("stone (of) help") to reflect the help given to Scrooge to change his life. Commentators have suggested that the surname was partly inspired by the word "scrouge", meaning "crowd" or "squeeze", which was in use in the early 1800s.

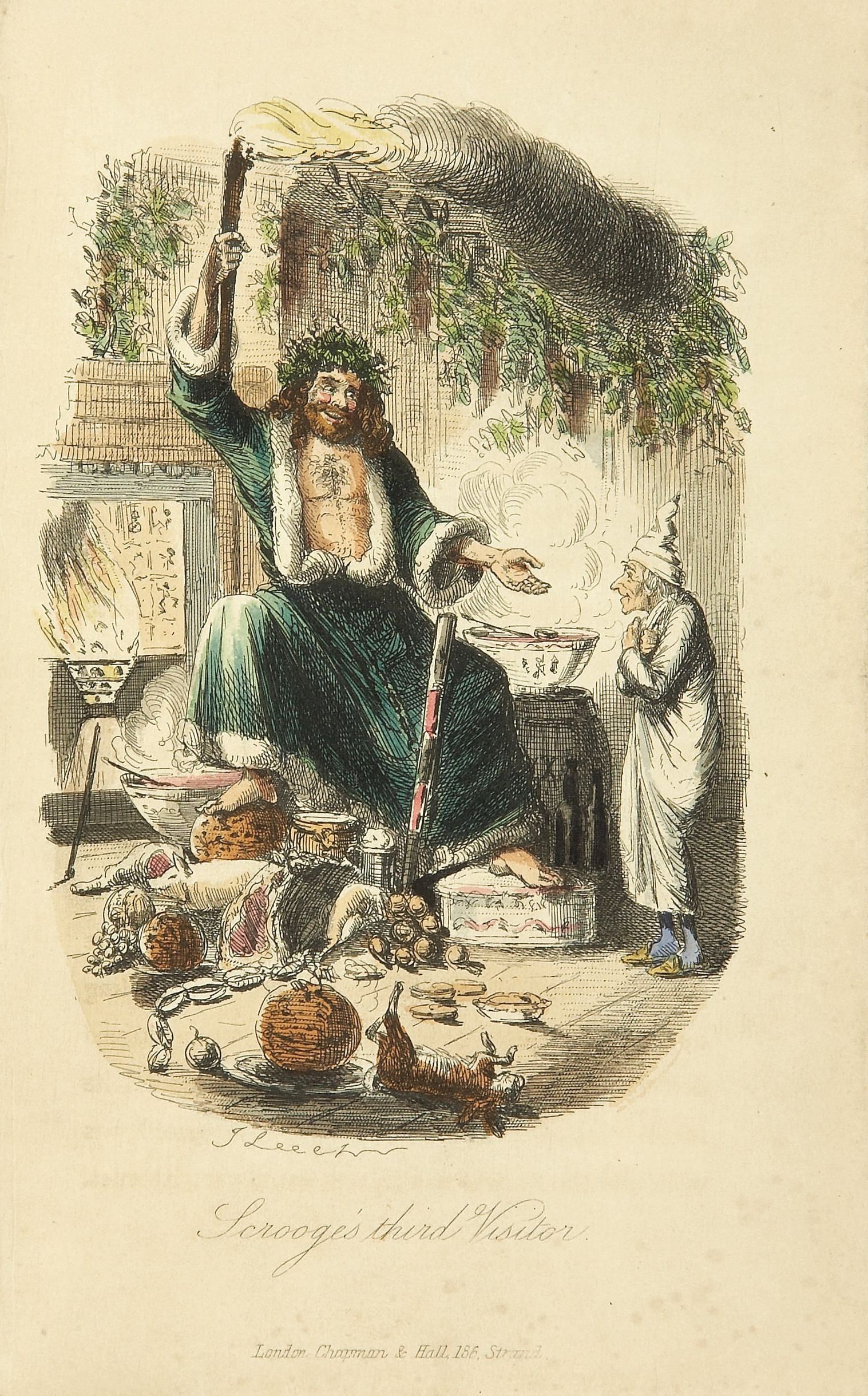
Scrooge and the Ghost of Christmas Present (Note: Illustration by John Leech (1843))

Kelly writes that Scrooge may have been influenced by Dickens' conflicting feelings for his father, whom he loved and demonised. This psychological conflict may be responsible for the two radically different Scrooges in the tale—one a cold, stingy recluse, the other a benevolent, loving man. Robert Douglas-Fairhurst, a professor of English literature, considers that in the opening part of the book portraying young Scrooge's lonely and unhappy childhood, and his aspiration to rise from poverty to riches "is something of a self-parody of Dickens's fears about himself"; the post-transformation parts of the book are how Dickens optimistically sees himself.

One school of thought is that Dickens based Scrooge's views of the poor on those of political economist and demographer Thomas Malthus, as evidenced by his callous attitude towards the "surplus population". "And the Union workhouses? ... The treadmill and the Poor Law are in full vigour, then?" are a reflection of a sarcastic question raised by the reactionary philosopher Thomas Carlyle: "Are there not treadmills, gibbets; even hospitals, poor-rates, New Poor-Law?" (Note: Carlyle's original question was written in his 1840 work Chartism.)

There are literary precursors for Scrooge in Dickens's own works. Peter Ackroyd, Dickens's biographer, sees similarities between Scrooge and the title character of Martin Chuzzlewit, although the latter is "a more fantastic image" than the former; Ackroyd observes that Chuzzlewit's transformation to a charitable man is parallel to that of Scrooge. Douglas-Fairhurst sees that the minor character Gabriel Grub from The Pickwick Papers was also an influence when creating Scrooge. (Note: Grub's name came from a 19th century Dutch miser, Gabriel de Graaf, a morose gravedigger.)

== Analysis ==
Scrooge's character, particularly how it changes throughout A Christmas Carol, has been the subject of several analyses.

The psychological phenomenon of increased generosity and altruism following encounters with mortality or existential dread is called the Scrooge effect.

== Notable portrayals ==
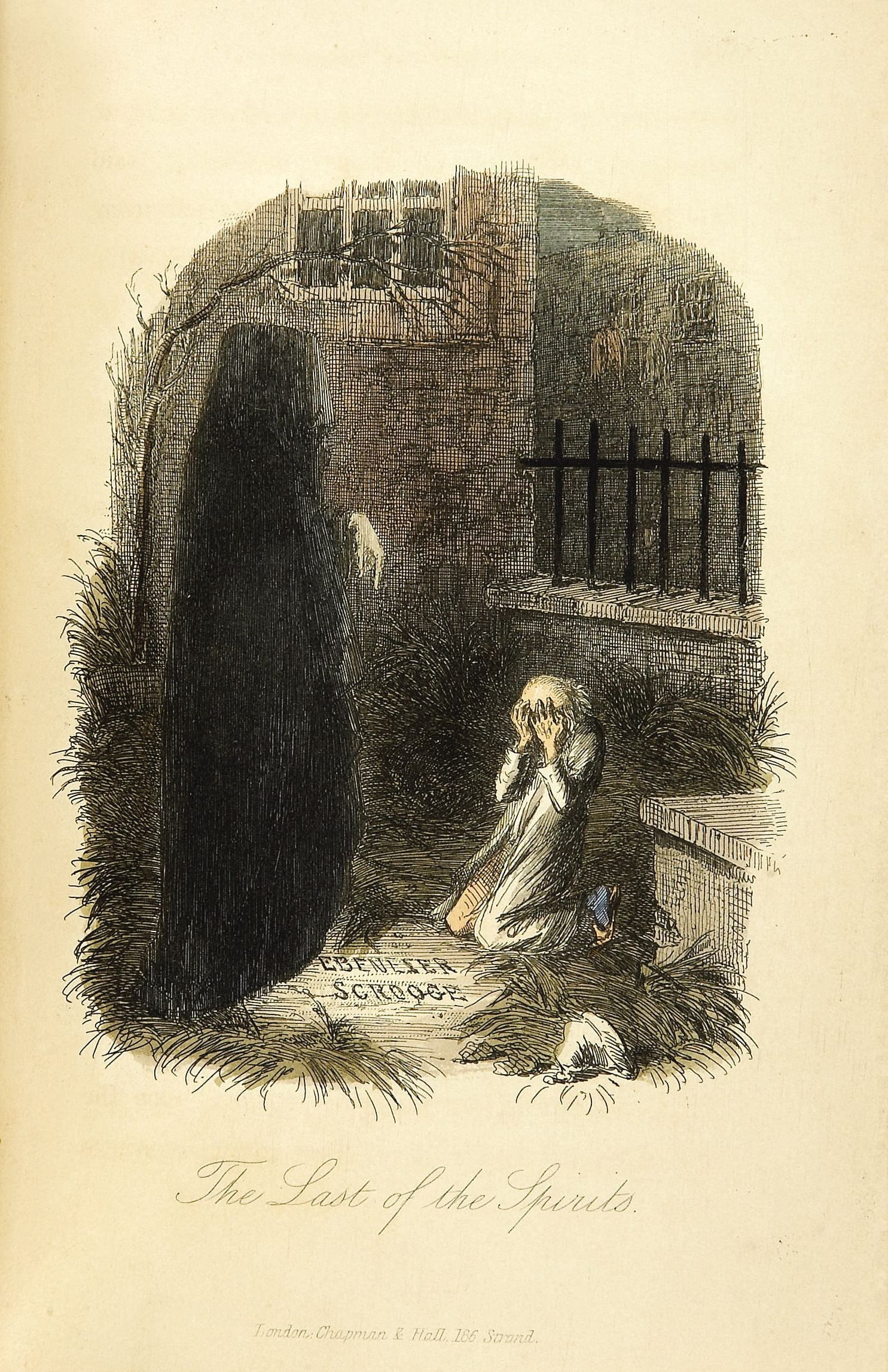
Scrooge and the Ghost of Christmas Yet to Come (Note: original illustration by John Leech (1843))

=== Film ===
- Seymour Hicks in Scrooge (1935 film)
- Reginald Owen in A Christmas Carol (1938)
- Alastair Sim in Scrooge (1951)
- Albert Finney in Scrooge (1970)
- Michael Caine in The Muppet Christmas Carol (1992)
- Jim Carrey in A Christmas Carol (2009)
- Christopher Plummer in The Man Who Invented Christmas (2017)
- Luke Evans in Scrooge: A Christmas Carol (2022; voice)
- Will Ferrell in Spirited (2022)
- Johnny Depp in Ebenezer (2026)

=== Television ===
- George C. Scott in A Christmas Carol (1984)
- Jack Palance in Ebenezer (1998)
- Patrick Stewart in A Christmas Carol (1999)
- Kelsey Grammer in A Christmas Carol (2004)
- Guy Pearce in A Christmas Carol (2019)

=== Stage ===
- Patrick Stewart in A Christmas Carol (1988, one-man play)
- Tim Curry in A Christmas Carol (2001 revival)
- Rhys Ifans in A Christmas Carol (2017; original cast)
- Nicholas Farrell in A Christmas Carol: A Ghost Story (2021)

== In other media ==
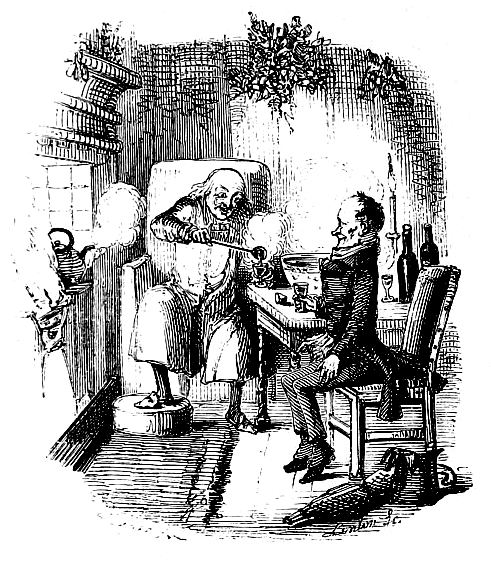
Scrooge and Bob Cratchit celebrate Christmas with smoking bishop.

- The character of Scrooge McDuck, voiced by Alan Young, was at least partially based on Ebenezer Scrooge: "I began to think of the great Dickens Christmas story about Scrooge… I was just thief enough to steal some of the idea and have a rich uncle for Donald."

== See also ==
- Grinch
- Uncle Scrooge

== Citations ==
- Ackroyd, Peter (1990). Dickens. London: Sinclair-Stevenson. ISBN 978-1-85619-000-8.
- Alleyne, Richard (24 December 2007). "Real Scrooge 'was Dutch gravedigger'". The Daily Telegraph. Archived from the original on 11 January 2022.
- Carlyle, Thomas (1840). Chartism. London: J. Fraser. OCLC 247585901.
- DeVito, Carlo (2014). Inventing Scrooge (Kindle ed.). Kennebunkport, ME: Cider Mill Press. ISBN 978-1-60433-555-2.
- Dickens, Charles (1843). A Christmas Carol. London: Chapman and Hall. OCLC 181675592.
- Douglas-Fairhurst, Robert (2006). "Introduction". In Dickens, Charles (ed.). A Christmas Carol and other Christmas Books. Oxford: Oxford University Press. pp. vii–xxix. ISBN 978-0-19-920474-8.
- Elwell, Frank W. (2 November 2001). "Reclaiming Malthus". Rogers State University. Archived from the original on 24 March 2017.
- Gordon, Alexander (2008). "Elwes, John (1714–1789)". Oxford Dictionary of National Biography (online ed.). Oxford University Press. doi:10.1093/ref:odnb/8776. (Subscription, Wikipedia Library access or UK public library membership required.)
- Jordan, John O. (2001). The Cambridge Companion to Charles Dickens. Cambridge: Cambridge University Press. ISBN 978-0-521-66964-1.
- Kelly, Richard Michael (2003). "Introduction". In Dickens, Charles (ed.). A Christmas Carol. Ontario: Broadway Press. pp. 9–30. ISBN 978-1-55111-476-7.
- Sillence, Rebecca (2015). Gloucester History Tour. Stroud, Glos: Amberley Publishing. ISBN 978-1-4456-4859-0.
