= Richard Cooper, the elder =

English engraver (1701–1764)

Richard Cooper the elder (1701–1764) was an English engraver, who for most of his career worked in Edinburgh.

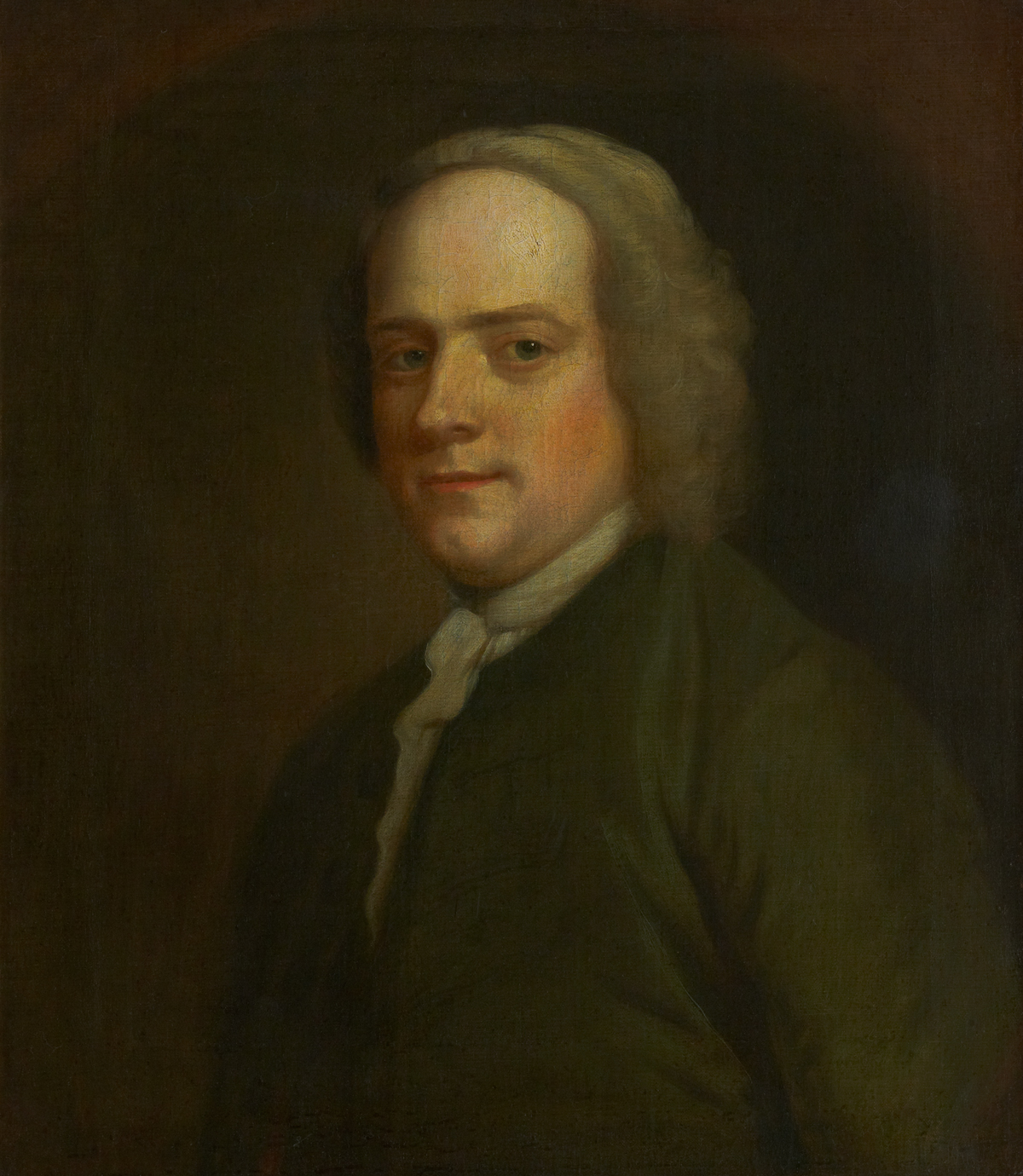
Richard Cooper, portrait by Jeremiah Davison

== Life ==
Cooper was born in London, and studied engraving under John Pine. On the death of his father he was able to visit Italy, where he spent several years studying the masters, becoming a competent artist, and forming a collection of drawings and prints.

On his return to England Cooper went with a Mr. Guthrie, to Edinburgh where he settled as an engraver. He built a house in St. John Street, which he decorated with his own pictures. He took on apprentices including Robert Strange.

Cooper died in 1764, and was buried in the Canongate churchyard, Edinburgh.

== Works ==
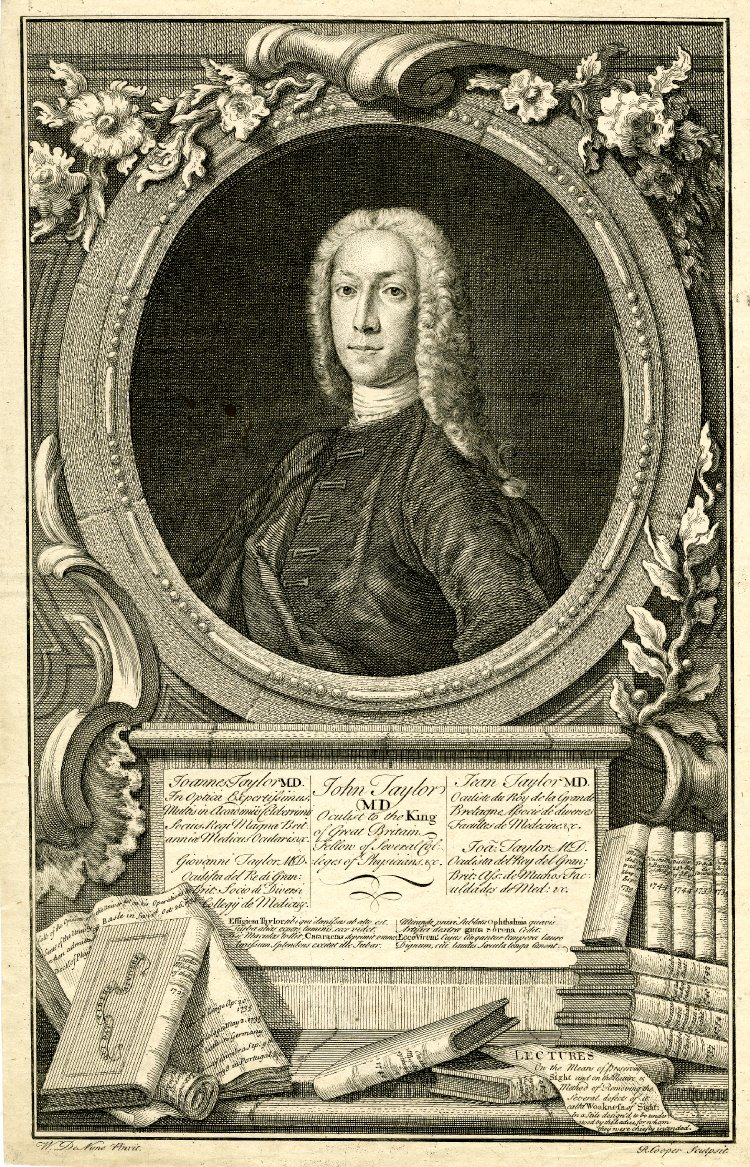
John Taylor the oculist, engraving by Richard Cooper

Cooper is best known for his contemporary portraits. Among his line engravings were:

- John Taylor the oculist, after William de Nune;
- William Carstares and Andrew Allan, both after W. Robinson;
- Hew Dalrymple, Lord North Berwick, after William Aikman;
- John Napier, the inventor of logarithms;
- George Jeffreys, 1st Baron Jeffreys, and others.

He also engraved in mezzotint, examples being:

- Archibald Campbell, 3rd Duke of Argyll, after Aikman;
- John Dalrymple, 2nd Earl of Stair, after Godfrey Kneller;
- Lady Wallace, and others.

Cooper engraved anatomical plates for the Edinburgh Medical Essays, and book-plates, and other similar compositions.

He is also considered by some to be the founder of The Canongate Concert Hall, the first building purpose-built for theatre in Scotland. In 1747 he applied to the Edinburgh Dean of Guild Court to build 'a house in a garden opposite to St. John's Cross, Canongate, wholly belonging to himself in property', however it was used as a concert hall. Built during the 1737 Theatres Licensing Act, it attempted to circumvent the legislation by displaying concerts of music instead of formal plays but was eventually closed due to a lack of Royal Permit before reopening as the Theatre Royal in 1767.

== Family ==
About 1738 Cooper married Ann Lind, by whom he left a son, Richard Cooper the younger, who followed his father's profession.
