= The Miser's Daughter =

Historical novel, 1842

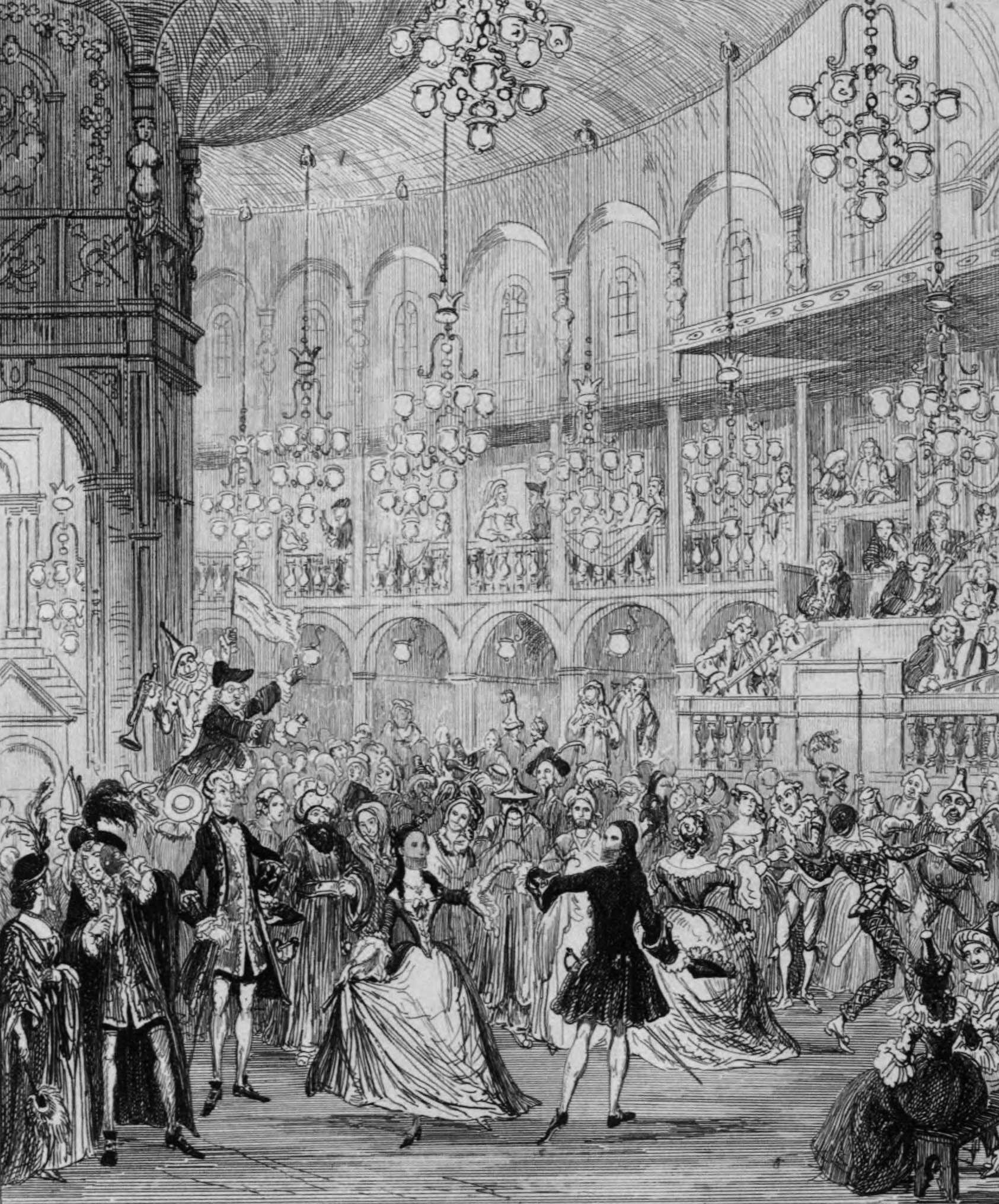
"Randulph and Hilda dancing at Ranelagh." Illustration by George Cruikshank.

The Miser's Daughter is a novel by William Harrison Ainsworth serially published in 1842. It is a historical romance that describes a young man pursuing the daughter of a miserly rich man during the 18th century.

== Background ==
Ainsworth wrote The Miser's Daughter in 1842 while he was writing Windsor Castle. During this time, he was constantly working and stopped only when his mother, Ann Ainsworth, died on 15 March 1842. It was published in a serialised form in the Ainsworth's Magazine with some overlap with Windsor Castle. George Cruikshank served as illustrator. The work was later published in novel format, but it did not include all of the illustrations used in the magazine. Sales continued into the 1880s.

A play version was put on by Edward Stirling at Adelphia in October 1842. Another version was produced by T. P. Taylor in November 1842 at the City of London Theatre. In April 1872, a version of The Miser's Daughter, called Hilda, was produced for the Adelphi Theatre by Andrew Halliday. This prompted Cruikshank, on 6 April 1872, to write a letter to The Times about the theatrical production. In the letter, Cruikshank was upset that his name was left out of credits for the play and claimed that the idea for the novel came from himself and not from Ainsworth. This provoked a controversy between the two.

== Story ==
The story centres around Randulph Crew, a man from Cheshire, as he comes to London during the early 18th century after giving up his inheritance to his father's creditors upon his father's death. While there, he becomes infatuated with a girl named Hilda, whose father, Scarve, is a miser. Scarve gets in the way of Crew's pursuit of Hilda because Scarve wishes for her to marry his nephew, Philip Frewin. Scarve also looks down on Crew for allowing creditors to take his inheritance. Crew's pursuit of Hilda is also opposed to by his uncle, Abel Beechcroft, because Beechcroft once wanted a woman that Scarve took from him.

While in London, Crew is taken to social events by his other uncle, Trussell Beechcroft. He is able to meet well known individuals and members of the theatre while attending gatherings across London. During these gatherings, the character Cordwell Firebras discusses Jacobite plots, but nothing comes of these. Scarve's nephew turns to the lawyer Diggs and is able to convince Scarve to hand over his fortune. However, Frewin is not able to keep the inheritance, as a duel takes place between him and Crew, and Crew is victorious. Afterward, Scarve dies, and, with the fortune as his own, Crew is able to marry Hilda.

== Illustrations ==
Cruikshank's illustrations are realistic and reveal many scenes from the novel, including a fight in one titled "The Jacobite Club pursued by the guard". His illustrations carried over to the novel edition, besides three woodcut portraits and twenty steel etchings that were included in the magazine edition. Cruikshank later publicly disputed how much credit he deserved in terms of originating the plot and characters based on a claim that he created the illustrations before Ainsworth wrote the novel.

== Themes ==
Ainsworth prefaces his novel with a discussion of greed: "To expose the folly and wickedness of accumulating wealth for no other purpose than to hoard it up, and to exhibit the utter misery of a being who should thus surrender himself to the dominion of Mammon, is the chief object of these pages." However, Ainsworth does not describe miserliness in any uniform manner. Likewise, the miser, Scarve, is someone who is sometimes depicted in a way that could provoke pity and sometimes depicted as someone to dislike. His death all alone takes a different tone from the rest of The Miser's Daughter, but it is done to reinforce what Ainsworth states in the preface.

The Miser's Daughter was intended as a period novel dealing with the 18th century. The subplots allow for the introduction of the period and serve to comment on aspects of London life. The events of allow for the social values held by the different characters to be revealed and discussed. A major aspect of the work deals with inheritance and wills, a legal concept Ainsworth knew of from his background working as a lawyer earlier in his life. The will in the novel allows for the plot to progress while also allowing for a commentary on how the law affects people.

== Critical response ==
The response from John Forster about The Miser's Daughter was positive, and in a letter from Forster to Ainsworth, 27 January 1842, he says: "I like the notion of your story. Come and tell me about it—and about your magazine [...] Your story begins well—but we will discuss to-morrow".

According to S. M. Ellis in 1911, "All the characterization in The Miser's Daughter is good, from the Miser himself and the determined, plotting Cordwell Firebras, to the stolid serving-man, Jacob Post, and his inquisitive neighbours in the Little Sanctuary. Westminster, of course, is where most of the scenes of the story take place." George Worth, in 1972, claims, "The London pleasure haunts of the day, in each of which important action takes place, are carefully described by Ainsworth [...] The virtues of this novel are clearly recognized when it is contrasted with a much feebler late novel set at almost exactly the same period, Beau Nash, in which mid-eighteenth century Bath [...] has none of the vivid ambience we sense in the mid-eighteenth-century London of The Miser's Daughter."

== Sources ==
- Stephen Carver. The Life and Works of the Lancashire Novelist William Harrison Ainsworth, 1805–1882, Edwin Mellen Press (2003) ISBN 0-7734-6633-9
- S. M. Ellis. William Harrison Ainsworth and His Friends. Vol II, Garland Publishing (1979) ISBN 0-8240-9663-0
- "The Miser's Daughter," by William Harrington Ainsworth. Harvard Art Museums. Accessed April 19, 2024.
- John Harvey. Victorian Novelists and Their Illustrators. New York University Press (1971) ISBN 0-8147-3358-1
- Jarndyce Antiquarian Booksellers (2021). An Autumn Miscellany. Archived 4 September 2021; accessed 4 September 2021.
- George Worth. William Harrison Ainsworth, Twayne Publishers (1972)
