= Jeremiah Davison =

British painter

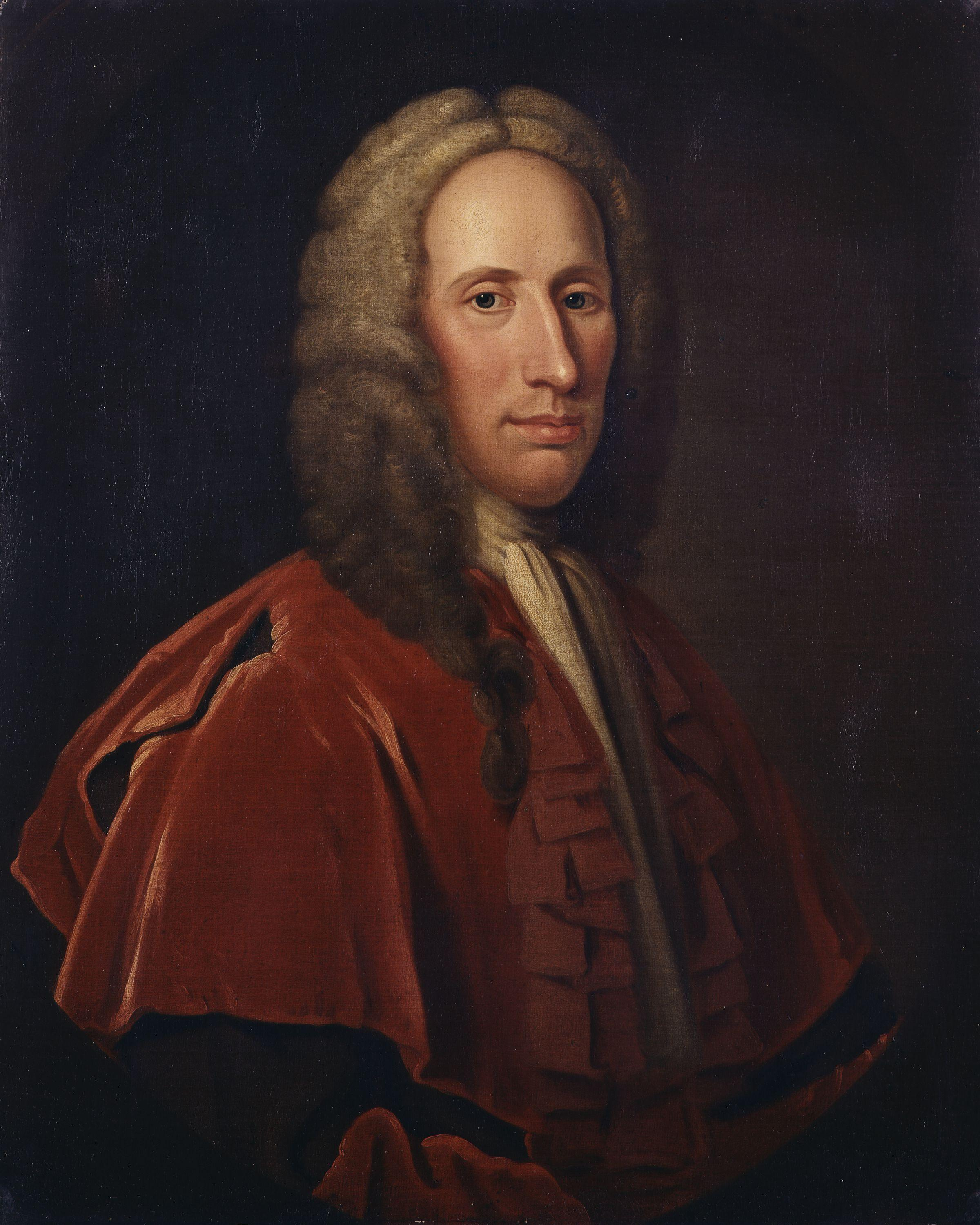
A portrait of Duncan Forbes, 5th of Culloden, Lord President of the Court of Session by Davison

Jeremiah Davison (c. 1695 – c. 1750) was a British painter.

== Life ==
Davison was born in England, of Scottish parentage c. 1695. He studied from the works of Sir Peter Lely, and under Joseph van Aken acquired facility in painting satin.

Davison died towards the end of 1745, aged about 50.

== Works ==
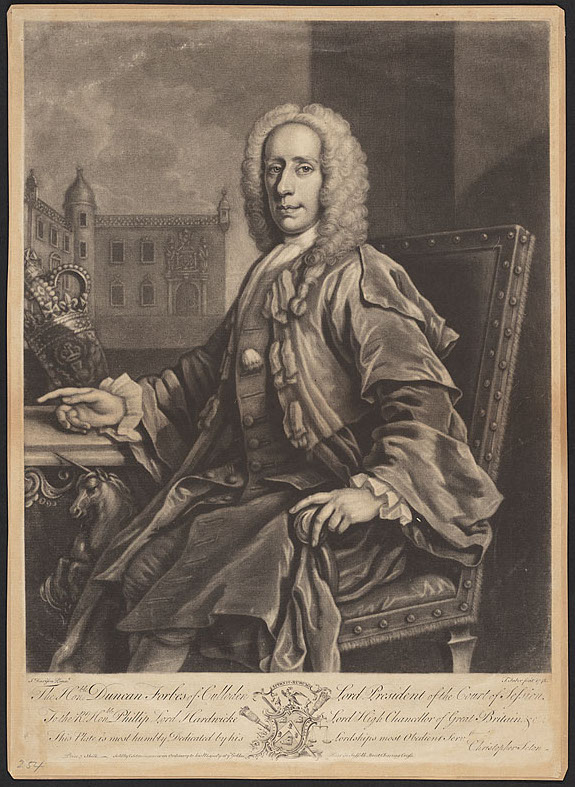
John Faber the younger, engraving of another of Jeremiah Davison's portraits of Duncan Forbes, 5th of Culloden, Lord President of the Court of Session (same person as the above). The statue of Forbes in the Parliament House, Edinburgh was also modelled by Roubiliac from this work.

Through a Masonic lodge, Davison became acquainted with James Murray, 2nd Duke of Atholl, and painted his portrait. Under the patronage of the Duke and Duchess he went to Scotland, and obtained a good practice as a portrait-painter in Edinburgh, and London.

In 1730 Davison painted the portrait of Frederick, Prince of Wales. At Greenwich Hospital is a full-length portrait by him of Admiral George Byng, 1st Viscount Torrington; in the National Gallery of Scotland is a head of Richard Cooper, the elder; and in the Merchants' Hall, Edinburgh, is a half-length of Elizabeth Macdonald of Largie, wife of Charles Lockhart of Lee and Carnwath. A portrait of Kitty Clive the actress was in Horace Walpole's collection at Strawberry Hill. A group representing James Douglas, 14th Earl of Morton and his family is now in the Scottish National Portrait Gallery.
