= Richard Cooper Jr. =

British artist (1740–1814)

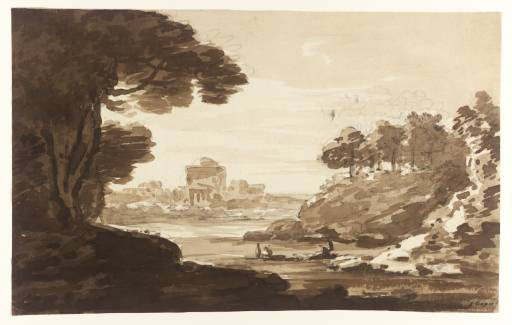
Richard Cooper II Landscape Composition in the Blot Manner. Watercolour on paper. Tate Gallery

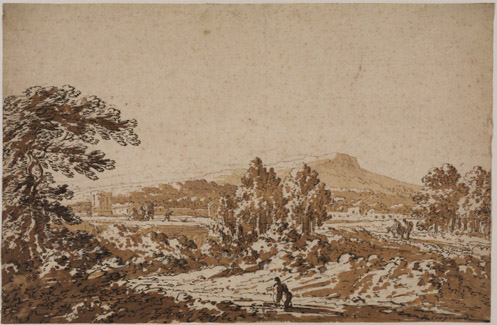
Classical Landscape with Figures by Richard Cooper Jnr. Pen and brown ink on paper.

Richard Cooper (or Richard Cooper Jr. or Richard Cooper II; 6 February 1740 in Edinburgh – December 1822 at Eltham), was the son of Richard Cooper senior (1701-1764) and his wife Anne Lind.

He is considered one of Britain's Grand Masters in Watercolour and Drawing. Despite this, little is known about him. He was an exhibitor at the Royal Academy.

Cooper succeeded Alexander Cuzens as Drawing Master at Eton College and taught members of the Royal Family. Queen Charlotte was England's enthusiastic Patron of the Arts and Queen to King George III. Queen Charlotte was interested in the arts and music. Cooper was her art teacher.

Cooper was taught by his father before moving to Paris to train under the engraver, J. P. Le Bas. Cooper went to Italy around 1770 but by 1778 he was back in Britain.

Original works are rare; The Tate has five original works and five prints; The Government Art Collection has five prints; the National Portrait Gallery, London has one original work and nine prints. The British Museum, however, has over ninety objects attributed to him including ten drawings and seventy four prints.

Cooper's work is typically dark, as he specialised in charcoal, pencil, pen and ink. He drew with a reed pen, which he used with rapid and flowing movements to produce strongly contrasted areas of light and shade. The yellow-brown tone of his broad washes suggest the ink used was bistre. The washes were diluted and applied over the iron gall pen work, causing the ink lines underneath to "bleed". The sheet is left bare in places to suggest falling sunlight. He would often sketch a scene to complete it in his studio years later. His subjects include Edward Kynaston, Sir Robert Naunton, John Lilburne, Mary Frith and Daniel Dancer. His landscapes often included the Thames riverbank, and around Windsor Castle, where he used his connections to gain access.
