= An ass eating thistles =

Fable attributed to Aesop

Developed by authors during Renaissance times, the story of an ass eating thistles was a late addition to collections of Aesop's Fables. Beginning as a condemnation of miserly behaviour, it eventually was taken to demonstrate how preferences differ.

== An image for misers ==
Two Greek poems from the 2nd century CE seem to have contributed to the making of the modern fable. One is the four-line poem of Babrius about a fox who asks an ass how it can eat thorns with such a soft mouth and is numbered 360 in the Perry Index. The other is a simile in a short poem by Lucian in the Greek Anthology (XI.397) in which he likens the behaviour of a miser to 'the life of mules, who often, carrying on their backs a heavy and precious load of gold, only eat hay'.

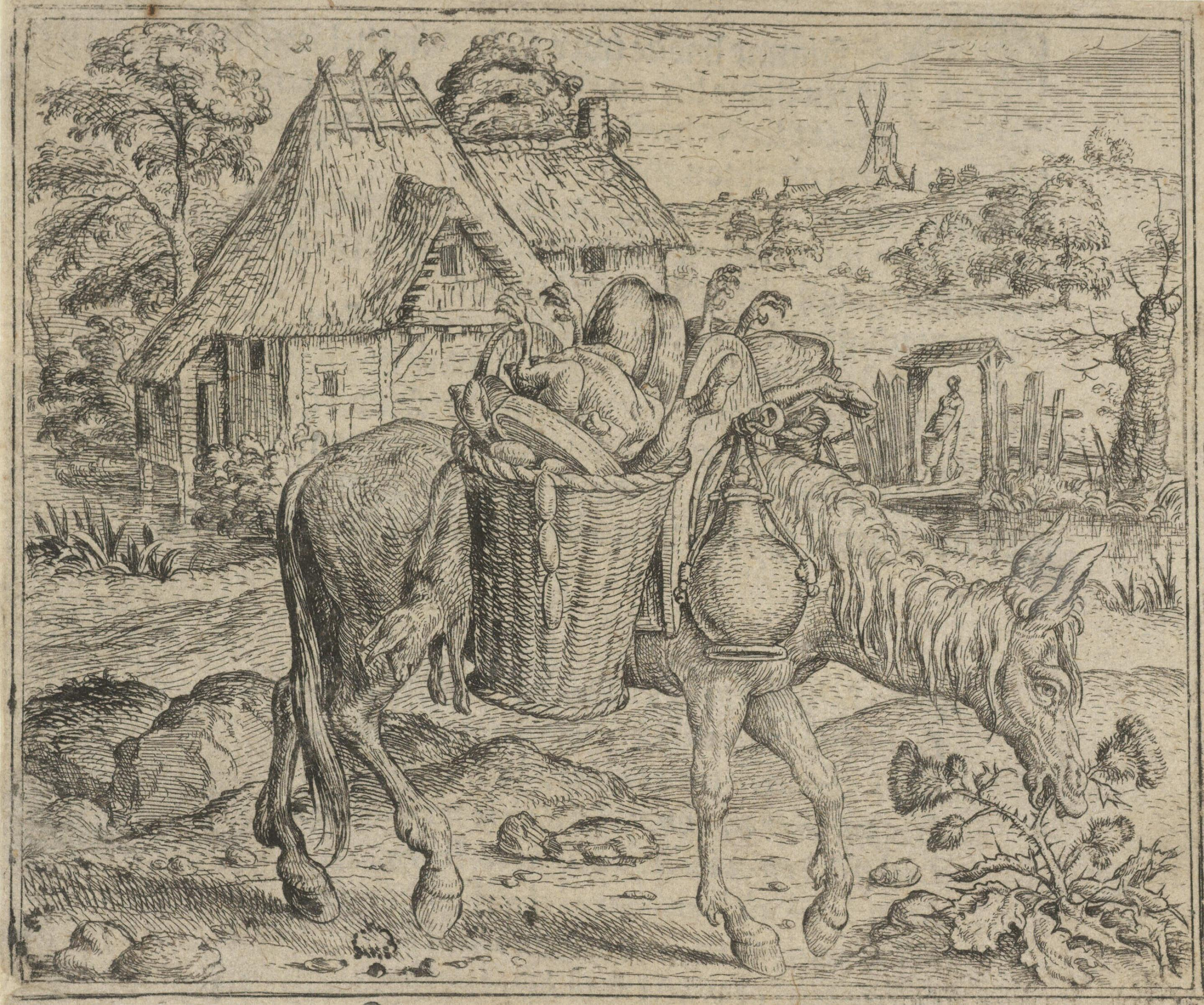
Marcus Gheeraerts the Elder, illustration from De warachtighe fabulen der dieren, 1567

Based on these, the Renaissance author Andrea Alciato created the image for misers in his Emblemata (1531). Below the picture of a loaded donkey that is stooping to eat a thistle he adds a Latin poem likening a rich man to an ass that, though it 'bears on its back costly victuals, he's a pauper who feeds himself on brambles and tough reeds'. The English emblem-writer Geoffrey Whitney was later to use the same illustration provided with a 12-line epigram based on Alciato's in his Choice of Emblemes (1586).

Alciato's book was influential all over Europe and fathered many similar works. One of these was Joost van den Vondel's De Vorstelijke Warande der Dieren (1617), which raised Aesop's fables to emblematic status. Among them, however, is a poem about "The ass carrying food", the first four lines of which use the same likeness before continuing to a much longer consideration of human meanness. That the situation was already well known in the Netherlands is suggested by the engraver Rafael I Sadeler's emblematic "Landscape with ass eating thistle". Dating from 1598/9, it is based on an earlier design by Matthijs Bril. Earlier still, the Flemish engraver Marcus Gheeraerts the Elder had been involved in illustrating a similar emblem book based on fables, De warachtighe fabulen der dieren, 1567. Some of his designs were adapted by his son, by then a religious refugee in England, as rondels for trenchers. Included there was the picture of an ass laden with rich foods and cropping a thistle, surrounding which is the quatrain:

The Asse which dainty meates doth beare
And feedes on thistles all the yeare
Is like the wretch that hourds up gold
And yet for want doth suffer cold.

== From emblem to fable ==
In the previous century, Christopher Marlowe had identified the image without evidence as Aesop's in his play The Jew of Malta (first performed in 1592):

For he that liveth in Authority,
And neither gets him friends, nor fils his bags,
Lives like the Asse that Aesope speaketh of,
That labours with a load of bread and wine,
And leaves it off to snap on Thistle tops.

In this case, however, it was being quoted in an almost opposite sense to the emblematic usage, criticizing those who neglect the opportunity to amass wealth.

A very similar emblematic design was used in Francis Barlow's illustrated volume of Aesop's Fables in 1687, where a final couplet of the short poetical commentary is applied to the miserly behaviour of "They that by brooding on their wealth are poore/ Without injoyment amidst all theyr store". However, the Latin description tells a very different story of the laden donkey being asked by a dog why it prefers the roadside thistles. His reply is that to his taste "the thistles which I am eating are more pleasing to me and suit my palate better than all the meat in the butchers' and all the confections in the bakers' shops".

Now that the situation was accepted as connected with Aesop, another writer set out to recreate the fable at greater length. The initiative of Samuel Croxall in his The Fables of Aesop and Others (1722), it was accompanied by much the same illustration and titled "The Ass eating Thistles". There an ass carrying all sorts of food to the harvesters himself chews on a thistle 'and while he was doing so he entered into this reflection: How many greedy epicures would think themselves happy, amidst such a variety of delicate viands as I now carry! But to me this bitter, prickly Thistle is more savory and relishing than the most exquisite and sumptuous banquet.' In addressing the moral lesson to be learned, Croxall quotes the English proverb 'One man's meat is another man's poison' and concludes 'he that expects all mankind should be of his opinion is much more stupid and unreasonable than the ass in the fable'.

More or less this wording was to be repeated from collection to collection for the next two centuries, while the former emblematic meaning was forgotten.
