= Marun Al Naqqash =

Maronite play writer (1817–1855)

- Born: Marun Mikhail Al Naqqash; 9 February 1817; Sidon, Ottoman Empire
- Died: 1 June 1855 (aged 38); Tarsus, Mersin, Ottoman Empire
- Occupation: Businessman
- Writing career
- Language: Arabic
- Years active: 1840s–1855
- Genre: theatrical plays
- Notable work: Al-bakhīl (based on a translation of The Miser by Moliere

Marun Al Naqqash (Arabic: مارون النقاش) (1855–1817) was a Sidon-born Maronite merchant. In 1848, he produced the first known theatre performance in the Arabic language.

== Early life and education ==
Al Naqqash was born in Sidon on 9 February 1817 into a Maronite family. In 1825 his family moved to Beirut, where he studied Arabic language and literature in addition to law and foreign languages, including French, Italian and Turkish. He also was active in poetry, Oriental music and was educated as a bookkeeper.

== Career and activities ==
Following the completion of his studies Al Naqqash began to work as a chief clerk at the customs department and became a member of the chamber of commerce in Beirut. He traveled to Damascus, Aleppo and Egypt for business. In 1846 he went to Italy, where he was introduced to Italian theatre and opera. After his return to Beirut, he translated The Miser, a play by Molière, into Arabic and published it under the title Al-bakhīl in 1847 as the first Arabic theatrical play. Al-bakhīl was written in standard Arabic and in verse, which allowed for musical elements. The Ottoman Sultan Abdulmejid was praised in the play.

Al Naqqash established a theatre for the performance of his plays near his Beirut home, following a permission from the Ottoman authorities. He also produced two original plays: The first one was Abu Al Hasan al-Mughaffal aw Harun Al Rashid (Abu Al Hasan the Gullible or the Caliph Harun Al Rashid). This was based on an adaptation of characters of the One Thousand and One Nights and performed at his theatre in 1850. His last play was entitled Al Salit al-Hasud (The Impudent and Jealous Young Man), staged in 1852.

The content of Al Naqqash's plays was described as patriotic and loyal to the Ottoman Empire. He also wrote political poems in which he praised the Ottoman Sultan Abdülmecid and the Egyptian governor.

== Personal life and death ==
His brother Nicolas and nephew Salim Al Naqqash also were involved in theatre and formed a theatrical troupe. They drew primarily on French theatre for their Arabic plays, but had to stop their theatrical performances due to scarce public interest. Having left for Egypt, they contributed to the early development of Arabic theatre.

Marun Al Naqqash went to Tarsus in 1854 for business, where he died of fever on 1 June 1855 at age 38.
