= Scrooge effect =

Increased generosity following existential dread

The Scrooge effect is a psychological phenomenon that describes a noticeable behavioural change in individuals towards increased generosity and altruism following encounters with mortality or existential dread. It emphasizes that the realization of mortality motivates individuals to embrace cultural values and engage in activities that provide significance and transcendence beyond the concept of death. Corresponding to the terror management theory, the Scrooge effect proposes that existential apprehension can stimulate positive shifts in behavior. Individuals may prioritize acts of kindness and philanthropy as coping mechanisms to grapple with mortality and reaffirm their sense of purpose. Empirical studies suggest that personal adversities such as severe illness, financial adversity, or the bereavement of a loved one can instigate pro-social conduct, fostering sentiments of generosity and empathy. The Scrooge effect offers a conceptual framework within psychology to examine the determinants influencing altruistic behaviors and the underlying mechanisms driving transformative experiences. ,

== Ebenezer Scrooge ==
Charles Dickens' A Christmas Carol (1843), which has become a holiday classic, revolves around Ebenezer Scrooge, an elderly, rich man that the reader gets to know as being bitter and cold. During the night of Christmas Eve he is visited by three ghosts leaving him with lessons that guide Scrooge through a recognition. The ghost of Christmas Future reveals to Scrooge his future in which he passes away alone and mourned by no one. This encounter reminds him to change his behavior by donating his money to charity, being kind to others and spending time with his family. The character of Ebenezer Scrooge's transformation serves as a timeless reminder of the importance of redemption, compassion, reflection and the true meaning of the Christmas spirit. Charles Dickens' novel serves as a reminder of the true meaning of life and reminds the reader of the salience of mortality. This novel critiques certain social aspects such as social injustice, poverty, inequality, and the dehumanizing effects of greed exemplifying the phenomenon of the Scrooge effect. Therefore, Charles Dickens' classic Christmas story connects to terror management theory and the Scrooge effect.

The terror management theory revolves around the idea that the thought of dying should encourage people to act pro-socially. In the case of the protagonist of this novel he is not following social norms in terms of kindness and empathy. When reminded of the loneliness of his own death, terror management theory comes into play and gives him a new perspective and what is important in life.

== Studies ==
Dickens' story hypothesizes the following consequence of mortality salience: Generous behaviour leads to the belief that one is a meaningful and valuable member in one’s own construct of the world and the confrontation with mortality should lead to kinder and more benevolent acts. This hypothesis was tested by Pyszczynki et al. in the U.S. in 1996. 17 male and 14 female participants were interviewed about the importance of several charities, either directly in front of a funeral home or a few blocks away. Results showed that people with the direct view of the funeral home were more likely to rate the charities favourably. Just like Dickens' Mr. Scrooge, people that are confronted with their own mortality, in this case by standing in front of a funeral home, view giving to charities in a more favourable light. Pyszczynski et al. found that there is some form of in-group favouritism concerning the choice of charity. 27 introductory psychology students of which 18 were female and 9 male were given 1.50$ as a “compensation” at the beginning of the study and were offered to donate a small amount of money to the charity of their choice later in the experiment. People gave more money to an American house-building charity than to an international education charity. This is why one has to keep in mind that there are limitations to the Scrooge effect. Ingroup favouritism in relation to mortality salience was also demonstrated in further studies. Based on the research of Pyszczynski et al. in 1996, another study was conducted by Zaleskiewicz et al. in 2014 to investigate the Scrooge effect further using the dictator game (Study 1), the ultimatum game (Study 2) and a quasi-naturalistic situation (Study 3). They hypothesized that reminders of one’s own mortality would increase prosocial behaviour, leading to more generous distribution of financial resources and such behaviour would in turn suppress death-related thoughts. Again, this is what Mr. Scrooge is trying to cause. Mortality salience predicted the amount of money sent to the other player in the games, what is interpreted as higher joy solely from giving. These studies were specifically designed to investigate only the Scrooge effect. Since this phenomenon is connected to terror management theory, investigations commonly link the effect with the theory.

== Terror management theory ==
The Scrooge effect, a concept that delves into the correlation between human behavior and the realization of one's own mortality, can be explained by the terror management theory (TMT). It states that people's innate fear of dying leads them to look for strategies to satisfy their death anxiety by preserving their cultural values and beliefs. Acting in a prosocial way as well as dedicating yourself to religious beliefs are two of the main strategies for managing this anxiety. These observations were established through questionnaires about views relating to death and spirituality which were filled out by patients facing a life-threatening illness. Results confirmed that religious beliefs buffer the anxiety concerning the topic of death and decrease the likelihood of depressive symptoms. The Scrooge Effect is a sensation that shows the impact of TMT on prosocial behavior. TMT proposes that existential anxiety is triggered by reminders of mortality, like those felt by Scrooge. People frequently look to their cultural worldview and look for ways to reinforce their significance within it to diminish this anxiety. Individuals may feel more inclined to cooperate, show kindness, and be generous when they are made aware of their own death, whether consciously or unconsciously. These actions support a feeling of meaning and purpose in life to being in line with cultural norms and values. People reduce existential anxiety by affirming their worth and significance through helping others and improving their community. Life threatening events have the power to change an outlook on life; this is suggested by the study conducted before and during the COVID-pandemic. The results depict a significant rise in mortality salience. This is a prime example of TMT and the Scrooge effect. The anxiety concerning death and their own mortality also lead to an increase in prosocial behavior and a decrease of interest in materialistic properties. TMT suggests that exhibiting prosocial conduct can offer a feeling of symbolic immortality. Humans can find some psychological solace in the face of mortality when they leave a positive legacy that transcends their physical life and benefits others or society at large. Other studies suggest that mortality salience may not influence positive reciprocity, but has an impact on negative reciprocity (and on retaliation rather than altruism), which raises questions of the effect’s universality, and whether or not this effect is context dependent. Further research has shown that existential anxiety amplifies different radical behaviors, both positive, such as the search for meaning and negative, such as terrorism and religious fanaticism.
