= Daniel Dancer =

18th century English miser

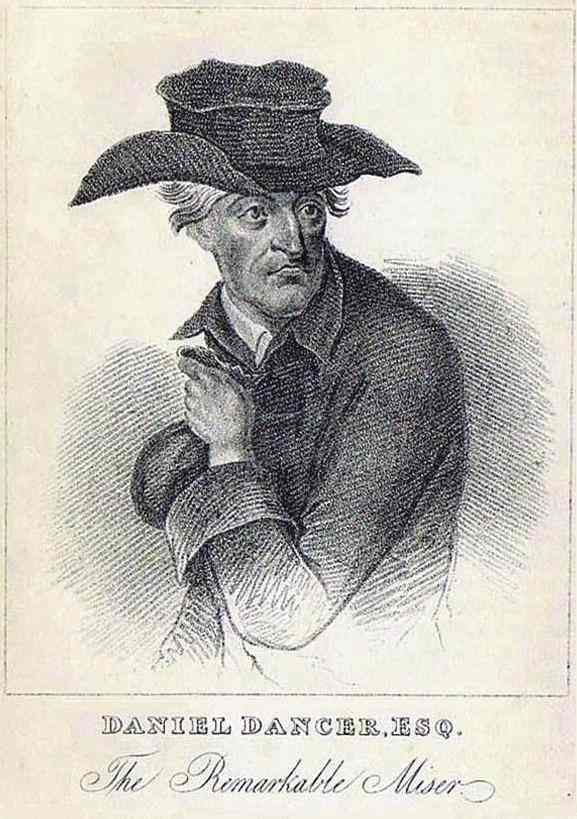
- Born: 1716; Pinner, Middlesex, Great Britain
- Died: September 1794 (aged 77–78); Great Britain
- Known for: being a miser

Daniel Dancer (1716–1794) was a notorious English miser whose life was documented soon after his death and continued in print over the following century.

== A "strange and unaccountable life" ==
The miser Daniel Dancer was born in Pinner, then a rural area in the county of Middlesex, in 1716. His grandfather and father were both noted in their time as misers and are only less famous because their accumulation of wealth was less. Daniel was the eldest of four children and inherited the family estate, eighty acres of rich meadow land and an adjoining farm, when his father died in 1736.

Hitherto Dancer had given no manifestation of his miserly instincts, but now, in company with his only sister, who shared his tastes and lived with him as his housekeeper, he commenced a life of the utmost seclusion and most rigid parsimony. His lands were allowed to lie fallow so that the expense of cultivation might be avoided. He took only one meal a day, consisting invariably of a little baked meat and a hard-boiled dumpling, a sufficient quantity of which to last the week was prepared every Saturday night. His clothing consisted mainly of hay bands, which were swathed round his feet for boots and round his body for a coat, but it was his habit to purchase one new shirt every year. And after his sister's death in 1766, he used a fraction of her bequest to buy a second-hand pair of black stockings to put himself in decent mourning.

The miser's only dealing with others arose from the sale of his hay. He was seldom seen, except when he was out gathering logs of wood from the common, or old iron, or sheep's dung under the hedges. To prevent theft, he fastened his door up and got into his house through the upper window, to ascend which he made use of a ladder and drew it up after him. The sole person who could be said to be at all intimately acquainted with the Dancers was a Lady Tempest, the widow of Sir Henry Tempest, a Yorkshire baronet. To this lady Dancer's sister had intended to leave her own private property, but she died before she could sign her will. There then arose a lawsuit among her three brothers as to the distribution of her money, the result of which was that Daniel was awarded two-thirds of the sum on the ground of his having kept her for thirty years.

To fill his sister's place Dancer engaged a servant named Griffiths, whose manner of living was as penurious as his own. The two lived together in Dancer's tumble-down house till the master's death, on 30 September 1794. In his last moments he was tended by Lady Tempest, who had shown uniform kindness to the old man, and who was rewarded by being made his sole legatee, for, despite his close nature, Dancer was recorded to have had "many praiseworthy qualities": these included the "most rigid integrity" with which he conducted business transactions and his habit "to give practical proof of his gratitude for service rendered to him".

== Posthumous reputation ==
Accounts of Dancer followed almost immediately after his death, at first in periodicals such as the Edinburgh Magazine and the Sporting Magazine, then in the volume Biographical Curiosities and in The Strange and Unaccountable Life of Daniel Dancer, Esq., both published in 1797. The latter work, which incorporated the lives of several more misers, was often to be reissued under various titles in the years to come. A later account based on these was contained in Frederick Somner Merryweather's Lives and anecdotes of misers (1850), a work made memorable by its appearance in an amusing chapter of Charles Dickens' novel Our Mutual Friend. Wishing to give himself the character of a miser, the 'Golden Dustman' gets an assistant to begin reading to him Dancer's life from this book:

Mr Boffin drew an arm-chair into the space where he stood, and said, seating himself and slyly rubbing his hands:

"Give us Dancer."

Mr Wegg pursued the biography of that eminent man through its various phases of avarice and dirt, through Miss Dancer's death on a sick regimen of cold dumpling, and through Mr Dancer's keeping his rags together with a hayband, and warming his dinner by sitting upon it, down to the consolatory incident of his dying naked in a sack. After which he read on as follows:

"The house, or rather the heap of ruins, in which Mr Dancer lived, and which at his death devolved to the right of Captain Holmes, was a most miserable, decayed building, for it had not been repaired for more than half a century."

The account then continues to the discovery of hoards of banknotes and coins to the value of several thousand pounds hidden in various places about the house.
