= List of Zabranjeno Pušenje band members =

Zabranjeno pušenje
- Origin: Sarajevo, SFR Yugoslavia (now Bosnia and Herzegovina)
- Genres: New Primitivism; rock; punk rock; garage rock; rock and roll
- Years active: 1980–1990, 1995–present
- Members: Davor Sučić; Branko Trajkov; Robert Boldižar; Toni Lović; Dejan Orešković; Anđela Zebec; Tomislav Goluban
- Past members: See former members

Zabranjeno Pušenje is a garage rock band from formed in Sarajevo (then Yugoslavia, now Bosnia and Herzegovina), closely associated with the New Primitivism cultural movement and the radio and television satire show Top Lista Nadrealista. They were one of the most popular musical acts of the 1980s in Yugoslavia, selling hundreds of thousands of records. Band was formed 1980, contrary to the then prevalent punk rock and new wave, Zabranjeno Pušenje created a distinctive garage rock sound with folk influences, often featuring innovative production and complex story-telling. Many times they went into trouble with authorities for their, usually mild and sympathetic, criticism of the socialist system.

Currently, the band consists of founding member, vocalist and guitarist Sejo Sexon, longtime drummer Branko Trajkov, guitarist Toni Lović, bassist Dejan Orešković, and violinist and keyboardist Robert Boldižar.

== Members ==
=== Current members ===
As of November 2019, the lineup of Zabranjeno Pušenje includes one vocalist, one guitarist, one bassist, one drummer & percussionist, and one violinist & keyboardist.

Image	Name	Years active	Instruments	Release contributions
	Davor Sučić; Sejo Sexon	1980–1990; 1995–present	lead vocals, guitar	All Zabranjeno Pušenje releases
	Toni Lović	2004–present	electric guitar, acoustic guitar	All Zabranjeno Pušenje releases from Hodi da ti čiko nešto da (2006)
	Branko Trajkov; Trak	1996–present	drums, percussion, acoustic guitar, backing vocals	All Zabranjeno Pušenje releases from Hapsi sve! (1998)
	Robert Boldižar; Robi	2004–present	violin, keyboards, backing vocals	All Zabranjeno Pušenje releases from Hodi da ti čiko nešto da (2006); Guest appearance at Hapsi sve! (1998)
	Dejan Orešković; Klo	2008–present	bass	All Zabranjeno Pušenje releases from Muzej revolucije (2009)

Source: Zabranjeno Pušenje

=== Former members ===
The former members of Zabranjeno Pušenje consist of three vocalists, ten guitarists, four drummers, six keyboardists, two saxophonists, and per one violinist, trombonist, and percussionist.

Image	Name	Years active	Instruments	Release contributions
	Faris Arapović	1987–1990	drums	Pozdrav iz zemlje Safari (1987), Male priče o velikoj ljubavi (1989)
	Kristina Biluš	1999	backing vocals	Agent tajne sile (1999); Guest appearance at Hapsi sve! (1998)
	Predrag Bobić; Dragan / Bleka	1996–2008	bass	Hapsi sve! (1998), Agent tajne sile (1999), Bog vozi Mercedes (2001), Live in St. Louis (2004), Hodi da ti čiko nešto da (2006); Guest appearance at Pozdrav iz zemlje Safari (1987)
	Mustafa Čengić; Mujo Snažni	1980–1986	solo guitar, backing vocals	Das ist Walter (1984), Dok čekaš sabah sa šejtanom (1985)
	Samir Ćeremida; Ćera	1982–1983; 1996–1998	bass	Fildžan viška (1996)
	Zoran Degan; Poka	1980–1983	keyboards	None
	Zenit Đozić; Fu-do	1980–1983; 1985	drums, percussion, backing vocals	Dok čekaš sabah sa šejtanom (1985)
	Dado Džihan	1987–1990	keyboards	Pozdrav iz zemlje Safari (1987), Male priče o velikoj ljubavi (1989)
	Ognjen Gajić; Ogi	1980–1987	saxophone, flute, keyboards	Das ist Walter (1984), Dok čekaš sabah sa šejtanom (1985), Pozdrav iz zemlje Safari (1987)
	Marin Gradac; Mako	1996–1999	trombone, backing vocals	Fildžan viška (1996), Hapsi sve! (1998), Agent tajne sile (1999)
	Dragomir Herendić; Dragianni	1999–2004	lead guitar	Bog vozi Mercedes (2001), Live in St. Louis (2004)
	Dražen Janković; Seid Mali Karajlić	1980–1981; 1984–1987	keyboards, backing vocals	Das ist Walter (1984), Dok čekaš sabah sa šejtanom (1985), Pozdrav iz zemlje Safari (1987)
	Nenad Janković; Dr. Nele Karajlić	1980–1990	keyboards, lead vocals	Das ist Walter (1984), Dok čekaš sabah sa šejtanom (1985), Pozdrav iz zemlje Safari (1987), Male priče o velikoj ljubavi (1989)
	Albin Jarić; Jimi Rasta	2001–2004	percussion	Bog vozi Mercedes (2001); Guest appearance at Live in St. Louis (2004)
	Paul Kempf; DJ Pavo	2005–2017	keyboards	Hodi da ti čiko nešto da (2006), Muzej revolucije (2009), Radovi na cesti (2013)
	Predrag Kovačević; Kova / Kowalski	1986–1990	guitar	Pozdrav iz zemlje Safari (1987), Male priče o velikoj ljubavi (1989)
	Sead Kovo; Sejo	1996–1999	lead guitar, rhythm guitar	Fildžan viška (1996), Agent tajne sile (1999)
	Emir Kusturica	1987	bass	Pozdrav iz zemlje Safari (1987)
	Mladen Mitić; Munja	1980–1986	bass guitar, backing vocals	Das ist Walter (1984), Dok čekaš sabah sa šejtanom (1985)
	Darko Ostojić; Minka / Oggie	1987–1990	bass	Pozdrav iz zemlje Safari (1987), Male priče o velikoj ljubavi (1989)
	Đani Pervan	1996	drums	Fildžan viška (1996)
	Nedžad Podžić; Počko	1996–1998	keyboards, backing vocals	Hapsi sve! (1998)
	Predrag Rakić; Šeki Gayton	1983–1986	drums	Das ist Walter (1984), Dok čekaš sabah sa šejtanom (1985)
	Mirko Srdić; Elvis J. Kurtovich	1996–1999	backing vocals	Fildžan viška (1996), Hapsi sve! (1998), Agent tajne sile (1999)
	Zoran Stojanović; Zoki	1996–1998	electric guitar	Hapsi sve! (1998)
	Lana Škrgatić	2016–2019	saxophone, concert flute, keyboards, backing vocals	Šok i nevjerica (2018)
	Bruno Urlić; Prco	1997–2004	violin, viola, keyboards, backing vocals	Hapsi sve! (1998), Agent tajne sile (1999), Bog vozi Mercedes (2001), Live in St. Louis (2004)
	Dušan Vranić; Duco	1996–1997	keyboards, backing vocals	Fildžan viška (1996)

== Lineups ==
Albums	Years	Members
Das ist Walter	1984	Sejo Sexon – rhythm guitar; Mladen Mitić Munja – bass; Mustafa Čengić Mujo – solo guitar; Predrag Rakić Šeki – drums; Ognjen Gajić – saxophone, flute; Dražen Janković – organ, keyboards; Nele Karajlić – lead vocals
Dok čekaš sabah sa šejtanom	1985	Mladen Mitić Munja – bass, backing vocals; Predrag Rakić Šeki – drums; Mustafa Čengić Mujo – solo guitar, backing vocals; Ognjen Gajić – saxophone, flute, keyboards; Zenit Đozić – congas, backing vocals; Sejo Sexon – rhythm guitar; Nele Karajlić – lead vocals; Dražen Janković – keyboards
Pozdrav iz zemlje Safari	1987	Dražen Janković – keyboards, backing vocals; Ognjen Gajić – saxophone, flute; Sejo Sexon – rhythm guitar; Predrag Kovačević Kova – lead guitar; Dado Džihan – keyboards, backing vocals; Darko Ostojić – bass, backing vocals; Emir Kusturica – bass; Faris Arapović – drums; Nele Karajlić – lead vocals
Male priče o velikoj ljubavi	1989	Nele Karajlić – lead vocals; Sejo Sexon – rhythm guitar, backing vocals; Predrag Kovačević Kova – lead guitar; Dado Džihan – keyboards, backing vocals; Darko Ostojić – bass, backing vocals; Faris Arapović – drums
Zabranjeno pušenje disbanded between 1991 and 1996.
Fildžan viška	1997	Sejo Sexon – lead vocals, guitar, backing vocals; Samir Ćeremida Ćera – bass; Đani Pervan – drums, backing vocals; Elvis J. Kurtovich – vocals, backing vocals; Marin Gradac Mako – trombone, vocals, backing vocals; Sead Kovo Sejo – lead guitar, rhythm guitar; Dušan Vranić – keyboards, backing vocals
Hapsi sve! (Live album)	1998	Marin Gradac Mako – trombone, vocals, backing vocals; Sejo Sexon – lead vocals, guitar, backing vocals; Elvis J. Kurtovich – vocals, reciting; Predrag Bobić Bleka – bass, backing vocals; Zoran Stojanović – electric guitar; Nedžad Podžić Počko – keyboards, backing vocals; Branko Trajkov – drums; Bruno Urlić Prco – violin, backing vocals
Agent tajne sile	1999	Sejo Sexon – lead vocals, guitar, backing vocals; Elvis J. Kurtovich – vocals, backing vocals; Marin Gradac Mako – trombone, vocals, backing vocals; Predrag Bobić Bleka – bass; Kristina Biluš – vocals, backing vocals; Bruno Urlić Prco – violin, viola, keyboards, backing vocals; Branko Trajkov Trak – drums, percussion, backing vocals; Sead Kovo Sejo – lead guitar, rhythm guitar
Bog vozi Mercedes	2001	Sejo Sexon – lead vocals, acoustic guitar; Dragomir Herendić – acoustic guitar, electric guitar, accordion, keyboards, tambura; Bruno Urlić Prco – violin, viola, keyboards, backing vocals; Branko Trajkov Trak – drums, percussion, backing vocals; Predrag Bobić Bleka – bass; Jimi Rasta von Zenica – percussion
Live in St. Louis (Live album)	2004	Sejo Sexon – lead vocals, acoustic guitar; Dragomir Herendić Dragianni – guitar, backing vocals; Predrag Bobić Bleka – bass, backing vocals; Branko Trajkov Trak – drums; Bruno Urlić Prco – violin, keyboards, backing vocals
Hodi da ti čiko nešto da	2006	Sejo Sexon – lead vocals, guitar; Robert Boldižar – violin, keyboards, backing vocals; Branko Trajkov Trak – drums, percussion, backing vocals; Predrag Bobić Bleka – bass; Toni Lović – electric guitar, acoustic guitar; Paul Kempf – keyboards
Muzej revolucije – Radovi na cesti	2009 – 2013	Sejo Sexon – lead vocals, guitar, backing vocals; Toni Lović – electric guitar, acoustic guitar; Branko Trajkov Trak – drums, percussion, acoustic guitar, backing vocals; Robert Boldižar – violin, keyboards, backing vocals; Paul Kempf – keyboards; Dejan Orešković Klo – bass
Šok i nevjerica	2018	Sejo Sexon – lead vocals, backing vocals; Toni Lović – electric guitar, acoustic guitar; Branko Trajkov Trak – drums, percussion, backing vocals; Robert Boldižar – violin, cello, keyboards, backing vocals; Dejan Orešković Klo – bass; Lana Škrgatić – keyboards, saxophone, flute, backing vocals
Karamba!	2022	Sejo Sexon – lead vocals, backing vocals; Toni Lović – electric guitar, acoustic guitar; Branko Trajkov Trak – drums, percussion, backing vocals; Robert Boldižar – violin, cello, keyboards, backing vocals; Dejan Orešković Klo – bass; Anđela Zebec – lead vocals, backing vocals, percussion
