= Uživo u Lisinskom =

Live album by Zabranjeno Pušenje
- Released: 1 July 2025
- Recorded: 8 February 2025
- Venues: Vatroslav Lisinski Concert Hall, Zagreb, Croatia
- Genre: Rock
- Length: 2:33:29
- Languages: Bosnian; Croatian
- Producer: Toni Lović

Zabranjeno Pušenje chronology
Pušenje ubija (2025)	Uživo u Lisinskom (2025)

Singles from Uživo u Lisinskom
- 1. "Fildžan viška" Released: 1 July 2025

Uživo u Lisinskom (transl. Live at Lisinski) is the fifth live album by the Bosnian rock band Zabranjeno Pušenje, released on 1 July 2025 on streaming platforms.

== Background ==
Zabranjeno Pušenje and their frontman Davor Sučić launched the Neuštekani project (a Croatian translation of the word Unplugged), in which the band performs its songs on acoustic instruments.

== Recording ==
All 28 tracks were recorded on 8 February 2025 during the concert Zabranjeno pušenje kao Neuštekani (transl. Zabranjeno Pušenje as Unplugged) at the Vatroslav Lisinski Concert Hall in Zagreb, Croatia.

== Promotion ==
On the day of the album's release, the band issued a new music video for the song "Fildžan viška". This was the second music video for the same song, the first having been released in 1998 when the track appeared as the fourth single from the album Fildžan viška.

== Track listing ==
Source: Apple Music, Spotify

No.	Title	Album	Length
1.	"Halid 'mjesto Halida"	Fildžan viška, 1997	6:21
2.	"Gospođa Senada"	Šok i nevjerica, 2018	5:01
3.	"Amilina pjesma"	Šok i nevjerica	4:40
4.	"Nema više"	Hodi da ti čiko nešto da, 2006	4:17
5.	"Arizona Dream"	Bog vozi Mercedes, 2001	5:26
6.	"Blues predsjednika opštine"	Karamba!, 2022	5:50
7.	"Pismo Elvisu"	Fildžan viška	7:26
8.	"Dobro dvorište"	Hodi da ti čiko nešto da!	4:34
9.	"Bog vozi Mercedes"	Bog vozi Mercedes	5:37
10.	"Dok čekaš sabah sa šejtanom"	Dok čekaš sabah sa šejtanom, 1985	6:38
11.	"Počasna salva"	Bog vozi Mercedes	6:48
12.	"Lijepa Alma"	Bog vozi Mercedes	4:08
13.	"Boško i Admira"	Radovi na cesti, 2013	5:02
14.	"Takvim sjajem"	Hodi da ti čiko nešto da!	5:14
15.	"Laku noć stari"	Hodi da ti čiko nešto da!	4:57
16.	"Sve po starom"	Šok i nevjerica	5:02
17.	"Kad dernek utihne"	Fildžan viška	5:43
18.	"Pos'o, kuća, birtija"	Agent tajne sile, 1999	4:36
19.	"Lutka sa naslovne strane"	Dok čekaš sabah sa šejtanom	4:28
20.	"Kažu mi da novog frajera imaš"	Dok čekaš sabah sa šejtanom	3:56
21.	"Karabaja"	Bog vozi Mercedes	6:23
22.	"Balada o Pišonji i Žugi"	Pozdrav iz zemlje Safari, 1987	7:41
23.	"Djevojčice kojima miriše koža"	Dok čekaš sabah sa šejtanom	3:56
24.	"Javi mi"	Male priče o velikoj ljubavi, 1989	4:04
25.	"Fildžan viška"	Fildžan viška	10:50
26.	"Šeki is on the Road Again"	Das ist Walter	5:04
27.	"Fikreta (Posljednja oaza)"	Pozdrav iz zemlje Safari	4:00
28.	"Jugo 45"	Agent tajne sile	5:47
Total length:			2:33:29

== Personnel ==
Zabranjeno Pušenje

- Sejo Sexon – lead vocals
- Toni Lović – acoustic guitar
- Branko Trajkov Trak – drums, backing vocals
- Robert Boldižar – violin
- Dejan Orešković Klo – bass
- Anđela Zebec – vocals, backing vocals, percussion
- Tomislav Goluban – harmonica

Production

- Toni Lović – production
- Dario Vitez – executive production, tour manager

Design

- Dario Vitez – design
- Goran Milašinović – layout
- Saša Midžor Sučić – photos
