= Shaderwan Code =

- Origin: Zagreb, Croatia
- Genres: Sevdalinka; nasheed; rock and roll; jazz
- Years active: 2006–present
- Labels: Reflektor Music; Tropik
- Spinoff of: Zabranjeno Pušenje; Zagreb Mosque Choir Arabeske
- Website: Official website

Shaderwan Code is a Bosnian folk music supergroup formed in Zagreb, Croatia in 2006. The group is formed a friendly match between the rock band Zabranjeno Pušenje and the Zagreb Mosque Choir Arabeske. The group's name refers to a law book of shadirvan. The band's songs harbors folk tradition of the Western Balkans, Bosnian root music, Islamic poetics (ilahia) of the Bosnians and Bosnian Muslims, a concept of rock and roll as primarily progressive music open to various music influences, but also a classic jazz sound.

== History ==
Zabranjeno Pušenje and the Zagreb Mosque Choir Arabeske has been collaborating on various recordings since 2001. At the first, Arabeske Choir featured on the Zabranjeno pušenje song "Lijepa Alma" (Bog vozi Mercedes, 2001). The collaboration of the popular rock band and the Zagreb Mosque choir came to peak during the writing and formation of the film score for the 2006 Bosnian action comedy film Nafaka, directed by Jasmin Duraković. In that occasion the Shaderwan Code was formed. Sejo Sexon, the bandleader and songwriter of Zabranjeno pušenje, has already been incorporating ilahia, Islamic religious songs, in musical arrangements for his band. The songs "Test za džennet" (Fildžan viška, 2001) and "Lijepa Alma" (Bog vozi Mercedes, 2001) before, and "Domovina" and "Laku noć stari" (both Hodi da ti čiko nešto da, 2006) after the 2006 film score collaboration with Arabeske Choir, can be regarded as an inauguration for Shaderwan Code.

In 2011, the group released their debut album Kad procvatu behari (transl. When the prunuses flourish). The record is produced by Sejo Sexon, Branko Trajkov and Paul Kempf. Kad procvatu behari was produced two singles; "Puče puška" and "Kad procvatu behari".

In 2018, the group released their second studio album Ah, što ćemo ljubav kriti (transl. Ah! Why We'll Hide Love). The record is produced by Sejo Sexon, Branko Trajkov, Paul Kempf and Toni Lović. On January 19, 2018, the band released the first single called "Akšam" on their YouTube channel.

== Members ==
=== Current ===
- Sejo Sexon – rhythm guitar
- Branko Trajkov – drums, electric guitar, percussions
- Paul Kempf – keyboards
- Alma Srebreniković – vocals
- Amina Kazaferović – vocals
- Belma Hadžović – vocals
- Merima Salkić – vocals
- Selma Ibrulj – vocals
- Robert Boldižar – violin
- Mario Perčinić – bass

== Discography ==
=== Studio albums ===
- Kad procvatu behari (2011)
- Ah, što ćemo ljubav kriti (2018)
