= Pušenje ubija =

Live album by Zabranjeno Pušenje
- Released: 15 May 2025
- Recorded: 7 June 2024
- Venue: Šalata SRC, Zagreb, Croatia
- Genre: Rock
- Length: 2 hours, 48:24
- Language: Bosnian; Croatian
- Producer: Toni Lović

Zabranjeno Pušenje chronology
Karamba! (2022)	Pušenje ubija (2025)	Uživo u Lisinskom (2025)

Pušenje ubija (transl. Smoking Kills) is the fourth live album by the Bosnian rock band Zabranjeno Pušenje, released on 15 May 2025 on streaming platforms.

== Background ==
The anniversary tour marking the 40th anniversary of the release of the cult album Das ist Walter included more than forty cities across the region and worldwide. The Zagreb concert in June 2024 was one of the performances on this tour.

== Recording ==
All 31 tracks were recorded on 7 June 2024 during the concert at the Šalata venue in Zagreb, Croatia. The performance also featured the debut of young and promising keyboardist Vito Sučić, the son of Zabranjeno pušenje frontman Davor Sučić.

== Track listing ==
Source: Apple Music, Spotify

No.	Title	Album	Length
1.	"Neću da budem Švabo u dotiranom filmu"	Das ist Walter, 1984	4:31
2.	"Anarhija All Over Baščaršija"	Das ist Walter	1:47
3.	"Otpor, Stoko!"	Fildžan viška, 1997	5:17
4.	"Čovjek starog kova"	Karamba!, 2022	4:37
5.	"Pos'o, kuća, birtija"	Agent tajne sile, 1999	4:22
6.	"Pišonja i Žuga u paklu droge"	Male priče o velikoj ljubavi, 1989	6:43
7.	"Karabaja"	Bog vozi Mercedes, 2001	6:20
8.	"Selena, vrati se, Selena"	Das ist Walter	5:54
9.	"Možeš imat' moje tijelo"	Fildžan viška	4:54
10.	"Gospođa Brams"	Dok čekaš sabah sa šejtanom, 1985	6:37
11.	"Stanje šoka"	Dok čekaš sabah sa šejtanom	4:38
12.	"Kažu mi da novog frajera imaš"	Dok čekaš sabah sa šejtanom	3:43
13.	"Polovni Fender i napuknuti Shure"	Karamba!	4:13
14.	"Balada o Pišonji i Žugi"	Pozdrav iz zemlje Safari, 1987	7:41
15.	"Dok čekaš sabah sa šejtanom"	Dok čekaš sabah sa šejtanom	6:23
16.	"Halid 'mjesto Halida"	Fildžan viška	5:34
17.	"Lutka sa naslovne strane"	Dok čekaš sabah sa šejtanom	7:19
18.	"Djevojčice kojima miriše koža"	Dok čekaš sabah sa šejtanom	3:55
19.	"Boško i Admira"	Radovi na cesti, 2013	4:46
20.	"Guzonjin sin"	Male priče o velikoj ljubavi	5:11
21.	"Hadžija ili bos"	Pozdrav iz zemlje Safari	4:34
22.	"Abid"	Das ist Walter	2:19
23.	"Srce, ruke i lopata"	Pozdrav iz zemlje Safari	4:53
24.	"Jugo 45"	Agent tajne sile	5:16
25.	"Murga Drot"	Pozdrav iz zemlje Safari	7:13
26.	"Zenica Blues / Pamtim to kao da je bilo danas"	Das ist Walter	3:51
27.	"Fikreta (Posljednja oaza)"	Pozdrav iz zemlje Safari	3:49
28.	"Lijepa Alma"	Bog vozi Mercedes	3:58
29.	"Počasna salva"	Bog vozi Mercedes	6:45
30.	"Fildžan viška"	Fildžan viška	9:51
31.	"Ibro dirka"	Dok čekaš sabah sa šejtanom	8:06
Total length:			2:48:24

== Personnel ==
Zabranjeno Pušenje

- Sejo Sexon – lead vocals
- Toni Lović – electric guitar
- Branko Trajkov Trak – drums, backing vocals
- Robert Boldižar – violin, keyboards
- Dejan Orešković Klo – bass
- Anđela Zebec – vocals, backing vocals, percussion
- Tomislav Goluban – harmonica

Additional musician

- Vito Sučić – keyboards

Production

- Toni Lović – production
- Dario Vitez – executive production, tour manager

Design

- Dario Vitez – design
