= Second Gymnasium, Sarajevo =

Second Gymnasium
- Druga gimnazija
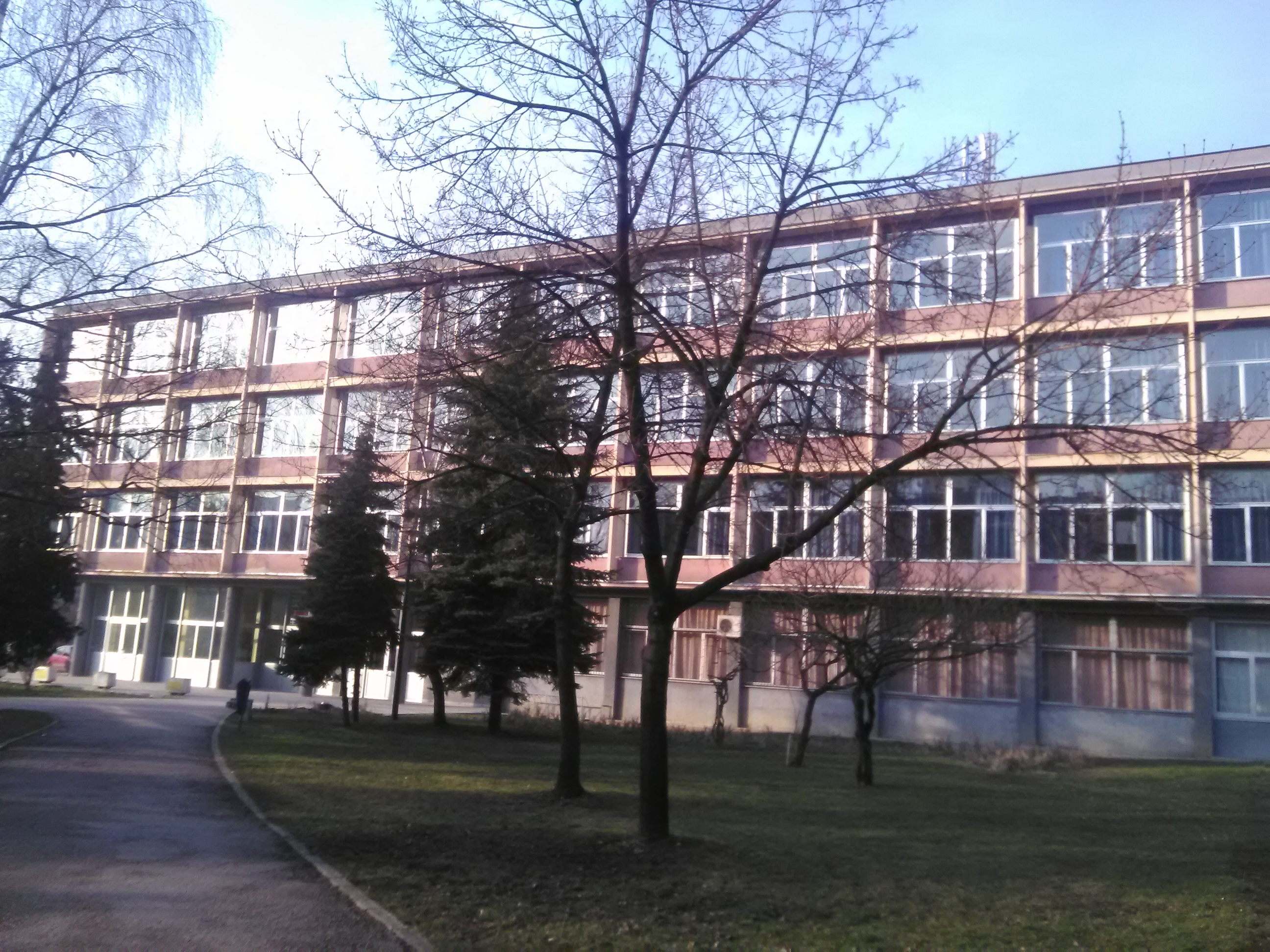

Location
- Sutjeska 1 Sarajevo; Bosnia and Herzegovina
- Coordinates: 43.862090°N 18.412351°E

Information
- Type: Public, co-educational
- Founded: 1905
- Principal: Dženisa Buljugić
- Teaching staff: 62
- Enrollment: 700
- Average class size: 24
- Language: Bosnian and English
- Colours: Blue and orange
- Website: http://www.2gimnazija.edu.ba/

The Second Gymnasium (Druga gimnazija) is a gymnasium school in Sarajevo, Bosnia and Herzegovina. Located in the central area of Koševo It enrolls approximately 200 boys and girls annually. Although most of the students are from Sarajevo, the school also attracts students from the region as well as children of international diplomats. The school's approximate number of students is 900. The school offers international and national study programmes.

== History ==
The school was founded in 1905 as an all-male school, but was made coeducational in 1957. As it was common in Yugoslavia, the school was officially named Gimnazija Ognjen Prica, after the national hero and teacher, but today adopts its current name standing for the chronological order of being opened, Druga being the second Sarajevo gymnasium.

== Education ==
The Second Gymnasium is a certified IB World School, offering MYP and Diploma programmes, making it one of the 3 high schools in Bosnia and Herzegovina offering IB curricula.

Besides IB, the school offers the standard BiH gymnasium Matura programme, with the first two years of core curriculum, and multiples fields of focused study for the final two years. The Second Gymnasium offers courses in natural sciences, linguistics, social sciences and math. Additionally, the school offers a four-year course focusing on mathematics, physics and computer science.

The students are usually divided into six homerooms per year, each housing about 30 students, randomly (except the MYP) at the start of their tuition, and then sorted later on, based on their chosen field of study; each homeroom has the same class timetable throughout the year (once again, except the IB Diploma programme, to which all the students as well as outsiders have to pass the entrance exam, and have a choice of subjects). This method is commonly used by the BiH Matura programme, but deviates from EU and USA methods.

== Notable former pupils ==
- Dražen Ričl, musician
- Emir Kusturica, filmmaker
- Mladen Vojičić, musician
- Branko Đurić, actor, comedian, director and musician
- Zenit Đozić, actor and humorist
- Nenad Janković, comedian, musician, composer and actor
- Nenad Veličković, prose writer and playwright
- Davor Sučić, musician, composer, film score composer, actor and television director
- Srđan Vuletić, filmmaker
- Zdravko Čolić, musician
- Zlatko Lagumdžija, politician
- Zlatko Topčić, screenwriter, playwright and novelist
- Safet Plakalo, playwright, poet, theatre critic, founder of Sarajevo War Theatre (SARTR)
- Davorin Popović, singer, songwriter
- Ognjen Prica, politician
- Slobodan Princip, Partisan fighter
- Kemal Monteno, singer, songwriter
