= Sejo Sexon =

Bosnian rock and roll musician

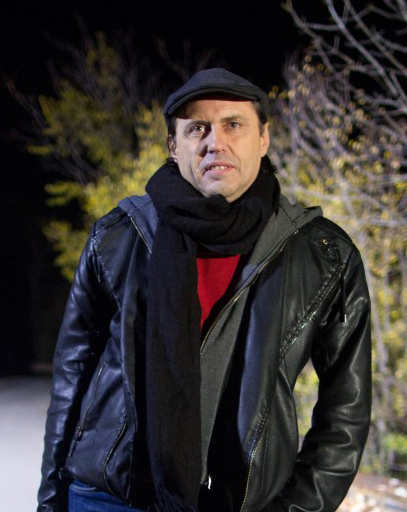
- Sexon in 2017
- Born: Davor Sučić; 7 June 1961 (age 65); Sarajevo, PR Bosnia and Herzegovina, Yugoslavia
- Education: Sarajevo Second Gymnasium
- Alma mater: University of Sarajevo (attended); University of Zagreb (BA)
- Occupations: singer; songwriter; composer; record producer; actor; television director
- Years active: 1980–present
- Spouses: Saša Midžor Sučić (m. 2003)
- Children: 3
- Musical career
- Genres: New Primitivism; Rock; Garage Rock; Rock and roll
- Instruments: Vocals; rhythm guitar; acoustic guitar; percussion
- Label: TLN-Europa
- Member of: Zabranjeno Pušenje; Shaderwan Code
- Formerly of: Elvis J. Kurtović & His Meteors

Davor Sučić (pronounced [dâʋor sût͡ʃit͡ɕ]; born 7 June 1961), better known by his stage name Sejo Sexon, is a Bosnian rock and roll musician, film score composer, actor and television director. He is the leader and co-founder of Zabranjeno Pušenje, contributing on all of its releases. Sejo Sexon was one of the founders of the New Primitivism movement in his hometown Sarajevo. As an actor, he has been featured in Top lista nadrealista.

== Music career ==
=== 1980–1990 ===
Sejo Sexon started playing the guitar at the age of 12. In 1978, he formed a rock band named Pseudo Blues Band with Nenad Janković, a singer and keyboardist who was his neighbor in Sarajevo at the time. The band worked on recording psychedelic compositions in home production and did not have live performances or official releases. In 1980, they invited Zenit Đozić to the band and renamed it to the Pseudo Blues Band Zabranjeno pušenje.

Initially using the pseudonym Elvis J. Spahović, Sejo Sexon was one of the founders of the New Primitivism movement in Sarajevo. In 1981, while most of the band members went off to compulsory military service, Dražen Janković and Sejo Sexon met with Elvis J. Kurtović and they formed the band Elvis J. Kurtović & His Meteors. The band also expanded by adding Dražen Ričl and Radomir "Hare" Gavrilović. Originally formed as an optional mingle, their first performance occurred in fall 1981. They soon gets the status of a cult band whose success exceeds notability of their primary bands.

Sejo Sexon performed with Zabranjeno Pušenje around Sarajevo for two years before beginning to record material for a debut album during Fall 1983 in producer Paša Ferović's modest studio. The shambolic recording process took seven months before the album named Das ist Walter got released by Jugoton in April 1984 in the small print of 3,000 copies, clearly indicative of the label's extremely low commercial expectations. Although the album was initially released in the small print, the final count was 100,000 copies sold, setting a record for exceeding the initial release by 30 times. In autumn 1984, they embarked on a 60-concert nationwide tour, making them one of the biggest Yugoslav rock attractions after just one album.

In 1990, together with Darko Ostojić (Minka) and Faris Arapović, Sejo Sexon left Zabranjeno pušenje due to different views on political differences in Yugoslav leadership in late 1980s and the band vision as well. In that time, Sejo Sexon and Ostojić worked on their solo record for Diskoton, but that studio album went unreleased due to the start of the Bosnian War.

=== 1995–2010 ===
In March 1999, Sejo Sexon finished the sixth Zabranjeno pušenje album, entitled Agent tajne sile (lit. 'A Secret Force Agent'). The album was released in June of the same year. Next studio album Bog vozi Mercedes (lit. 'God drives a Mercedes'), released in December 2001, was record by home made production in improvised studios in Bjelolasica and Ivanić Grad. The album was planned to be a noncommercial break from the major music projects. No one expected that it would become one of the best selling Zabranjeno pušenje albums. The album went on to sell more than 35,000 copies. Sejo Sexon wrote and produced four music videos (out of six) for that album. For the song "Arizona Dream" he won the 2002 Davorin Award for the best rock song.

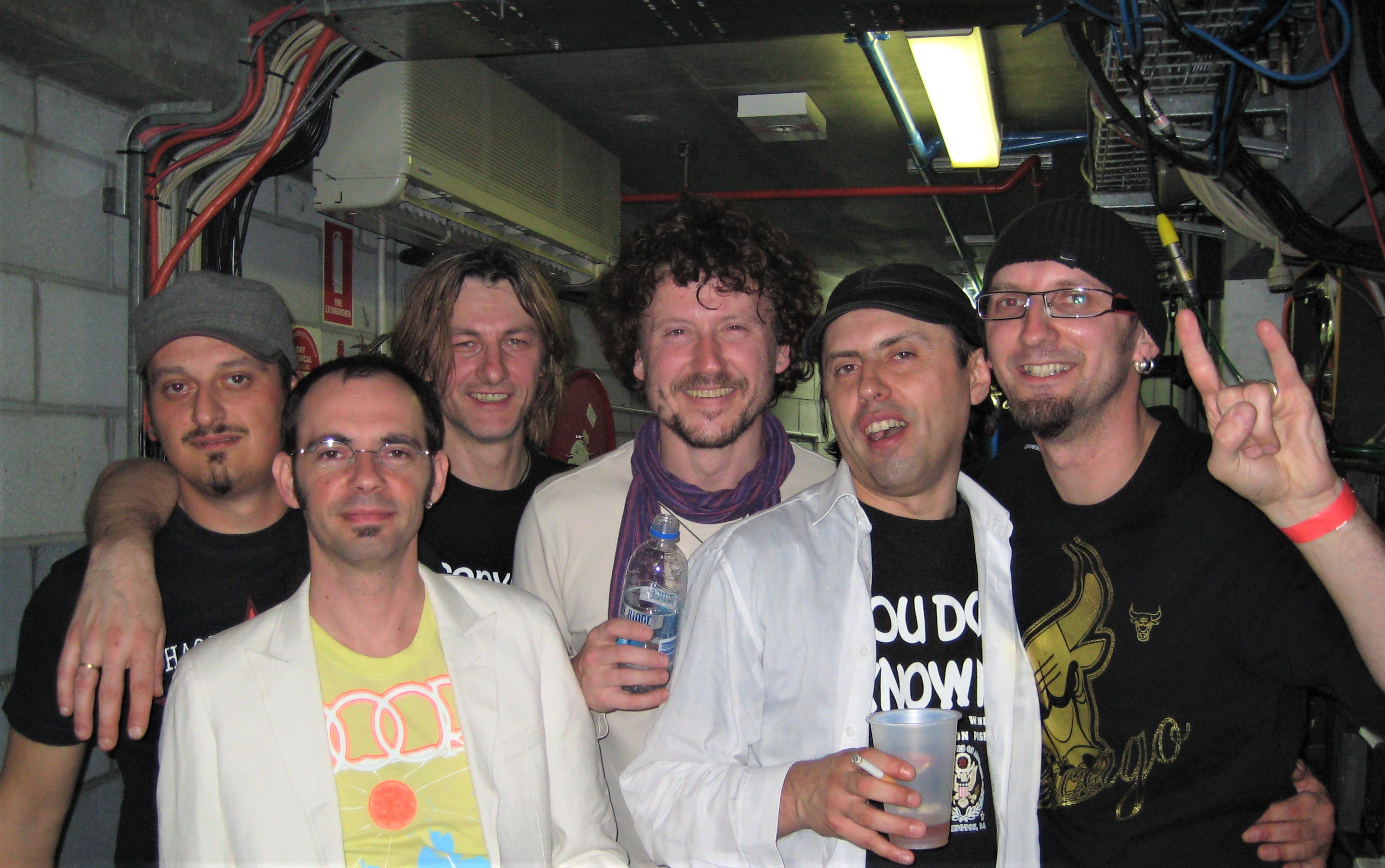
Sexon (second from right) with Zabranjeno Pušenje and Krešimir Kaštelan (middle) in 2008.

In 2002, Sejo Sexon went with Zabranjeno pušenje on the United States tour. On 26 May, the band recorded its second live album at the Casa Loma Ballroom in St. Louis, Missouri.

In 2004, Sexon begun to work on the double-full-length album Hodi da ti čiko nešto da!. In 2005, he wrote a film score for the 2006 Bosnian action comedy film Nafaka. On that project, he got an opportunity to collaborate with prominent musicians of different genres, such as: Halid Bešlić, Arsen Dedić, Lucija Šerbedžija, and the Mosque Choir Arabeske. In June 2006, the song Nema više, the first single from Hodi da ti čiko nešto da! and Nafaka Soundtrack as well, was released and became a hit single. Sejo Sexon wrote this song with a Bosnian prose writer and playwright Nenad Veličković. On November 16, 2006, Zabranjeno pušenje released their eighth studio album.

By the end of 2006, Sexon had begun to establish a supergroup Shaderwan Code (a law book of shadirvan), following a sort of a friendly match between the band Zabranjeno pušenje and the Zagreb Mosque Choir Arabeske. The Shaderwan Code's songs harbours folk tradition of the Western Balkans, Bosnian root music, Islamic poetics of the Bosnians and Bosniaks, a concept of rock and roll as primarily progressive music open to various music influences, but also a classic jazz sound.

In Autumn 2008, Sexon worked on the next album for Zabranjeno Pušenje with the band's guitarist Toni Lović. The ninth studio album Muzej revolucije (lit. 'The Museum of the Revolution') was released on 7 November 2009 to commemorate the 92nd anniversary of the October Revolution.

=== 2010–present ===
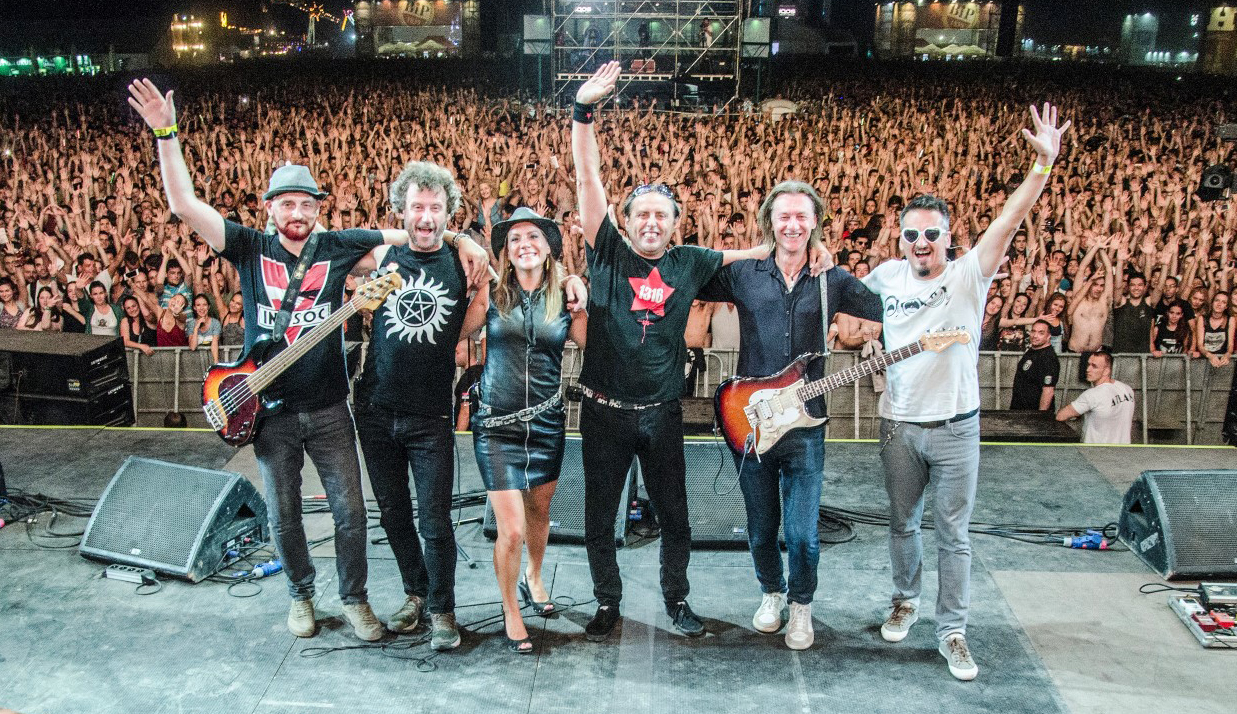
Sexon (middle, waving) with Zabranjeno Pušenje at the 2017 Belgrade Beer Fest.

In 2011, Sexon directed a music video for the third single of Muzej revolucije titled Kada Sena pleše. It was his directorial debut. He also wrote the script for the same music video. On 15 April 2011, Shaderwan Code released their debut album Kad procvatu behari. Sexon also directed a music video for a song "Samir-time", the fifth and last single of Muzej revolucije.

In 2012, Sexon and Toni Lović wrote ten new songs for the tenth Zabranjeno pušenje studio album. On 10 October 2013, Radovi na cesti (lit. 'Roadworks') was released through Croatia Records and Dallas Records. He co-directed two music videos for promotion of this album. On 28 December, Sejo Sexon and Zabranjeno pušenje celebrated the 30th Anniversary of the band during a concert in Skenderija, Sarajevo.

Sexon and Zabranjeno pušenje performed live at the Exit Summer of Love 2017 in Novi Sad, Serbia, and at the Belgrade Beer Fest in 2017.

In 2025, Sexon performed on the band's two live albums, Pušenje ubija and Uživo u Lisinskom.

== Radio and TV career ==
=== Top lista Nadrealista ===
Sexon was working occasionally on the sketch comedy and variety show Top lista nadrealista between 1984 and 1991. In late June 1992, he started to work on a 15-minute weekly radio shows for Top lista nadrealista. In August 1993, after 50 odd shows on radio, the group shot and aired four television episodes. Sejo Sexon produced a soundtrack for TV series and a theater play Top lista nadrealista. After re-union of Zabrenjeno pušenje in 1996, Sejo Sexon and Elvis J. Kurović had more than 300 occasions where then performed live Top lista nadrealista across Bosnia and Herzegovina, Croatia, Slovenia, Germany, Austria, Denmark and Switzerland. That tour was supported by the USAID office in Sarajevo.

=== Other projects ===
In the late 1980s, Sexon wrote film scores for two TV mini series for kids directed by Timothy John Byford and aired on RTV Sarajevo. With Goran Bregović and Miroslav Mandić, he won the Golden Rose award for the best TV advert clip at Monterrey, Mexico in 1990. In 2009, Sexon was a jury member together with Zele Lipovača, Davor Gobac, and Vinko Štefanac on Rat bendova (lit. 'The Band Wars'), a musical contest that aired on Bosnian television network OBN.

== Humanitarian work ==
In 1994 and later, Sexon had worked as a project manager for the Umbrella Grant humanitarian organization. They organized more than 80 benefit concerts across in Bosnia and Herzegovina, Croatia, Denmark, Germany, and Slovenia to raise awareness about refugees of Bosnian War. In 2001, Sejo Sexon and his fellow band members from Zabranjeno pušenje took a part in a social responsibility project in which they organized music workshops for children and youth who were victims of land mines. The winter workshops were held in Kranjska Gora, Slovenia, while the summer workshops were held in Rovinj, Croatia. Project was supported by embassies of the Canada, Norway and the U.S. in Zagreb.

== Personal life ==
In 2003, Sejo Sexon married Croatian photographer Saša Midžor. They have two children together: Vito (b. 2004) and Nora (b. 2010). He has a daughter named Tesa, who lives in Sarajevo, from his first marriage.

Sexon has been writing short stories and columns for the Croatian daily newspaper Glas Slavonije for more than 15 years. Sejo Sexon earned his bachelor's degree in history from the University of Zagreb in 2009. The dissertation title is "The conflict between youth subcultures and Yugoslav official policy in 1980s".

== Discography ==
Zabranjeno pušenje

- Das ist Walter (1984)
- Dok čekaš sabah sa šejtanom (1985)
- Pozdrav iz zemlje Safari (1987)
- Male priče o velikoj ljubavi (1989)
- Fildžan viška (1997)
- Hapsi sve! (1998)
- Agent tajne sile (1999)
- Bog vozi Mercedes (2001)
- Live in St. Louis (2004)
- Hodi da ti čiko nešto da (2006)
- Muzej revolucije (2009)
- Radovi na cesti (2013)
- Šok i nevjerica (2018)
- Live in Skenderija Sarajevo 2018 (2022)
- Karamba! (2022)
- Pušenje ubija (2025)
- Uživo u Lisinskom (2025)

Shaderwan Code

- Kad procvatu behari (2011)
- Ah, što ćemo ljubav kriti (2018)

Elvis J. Kurtović & His Meteors

- Mitovi i legende o kralju Elvisu (1984)

Film scores

- Top lista nadrealista (1984)
- Tragom ptice dodo (1988)
- Paket (1994)
- Nafaka (2002)
- Ja sam iz Krajine, zemlje kestena (2013)

== Filmography ==
Year	Title	Role	Notes
1984–1991	Top lista nadrealista (TV Series)	Guest roles	
2002	Na svoji Vesni	Interpol policeman	
2002	Nafaka	Frontmen benda (uncredited)	Also composer
2008	Lud, zbunjen, normalan (TV Series)	Himself	Season 1, Episode: 33
2009	Partizanski film	Himself	Documentary
2013	Lud, zbunjen, normalan (TV Series)	Himself	Season 5, Episode: 16
2016	No Smoking in Sarajevo	Himself	Documentary
2017	Zarobljeno vreme	Himself	Documentary
2019	Tusta	Himself	Documentary
2020	Rokopisac	Himself	Season 1, Episode: 2
2022	Svjetla Sarajeva	Himself	Documentary

== See also ==
- List of songs recorded by Zabranjeno pušenje
- Zabranjeno pušenje videography
