= Paul Kempf =

Paul Kempf may refer to:

- Paul Kempf (astronomer) (1856–1920), German astronomer
- Paul Kempf (musician) (born 1977), Croatian keyboardist
