= Live in St. Louis =

Live album by Zabranjeno Pušenje
- Released: March 22, 2004
- Recorded: May 26, 2002
- Venue: Casa Loma Ballroom, St. Louis, Missouri
- Genre: Garage rock; new primitivism
- Length: 64:20
- Language: Serbo-Croatian; Bosnian
- Label: In Takt Records; Menart Records; Mascom Records
- Producer: Sejo Sexon

Zabranjeno Pušenje chronology
Bog vozi Mercedes (2001)	Live in St. Louis (2004)	Hodi da ti čiko nešto da (2006)

Singles from Live in St. Louis
- 1. "Posljednja oaza (Fikreta)" Released: 2004; 2. "Zenica Blues" Released: January 17, 2005

Live in St. Louis is the second live album by Bosnian rock band Zabranjeno Pušenje, released on March 22, 2004. It's released through In Takt Records in Bosnia and Herzegovina, Menart Records in Croatia and Mascom Records in Serbia and Montenegro. The songs are recorded over a night at the Casa Loma Ballroom in St. Louis, Missouri, on May 26, 2002 during the band's North America Tour.

== Background ==
As a part of the "God Drives a Mercedes, Also" tour in May 2002, the band went to Canada and the United States. They had concerts in Toronto, Charlotte, North Carolina, Chicago, New York City, and St. Louis. On May 26, 2002, the band held a concert at the Casa Loma Ballroom in St. Louis, Missouri. The recordings from that event later will be used for the live album.

== Critical reception ==
Professional ratings
Review scores
Source	Rating
muzika.hr	4/5 stars

Live in St. Louis has received favourable reviews from critics. Željko Draščić of the muzika.hr gave the album a positive review but had some concerns regarding final selection of songs.

== Track listing ==
Source: Discogs

No.	Title	Album	Length
1.	"Dok čekaš sabah sa šejtanom"	Dok čekaš sabah sa šejtanom, 1985	7:51
2.	"Pišonja i Žuga u paklu droge"	Male priče o velikoj ljubavi, 1989	5:01
3.	"Hadžija ili bos"	Pozdrav iz zemlje Safari, 1987	4:11
4.	"Selena, vrati se, Selena"	Das ist Walter, 1984	4:42
5.	"Možeš imat' moje tijelo"	Fildžan viška, 1997	4:49
6.	"Zenica Blues"	Das ist Walter	4:31
7.	"Test za dženet"	Fildžan viška	4:49
8.	"Jugo 45"	Agent tajne sile, 1999	5:01
9.	"Fikreta (Posljednja oaza)"	Pozdrav iz zemlje Safari	4:04
10.	"Lijepa Alma"	Bog vozi Mercedes, 2001	3:52
11.	"Kanjon Drine"	Male priče o velikoj ljubavi	5:23
12.	"Pos'o, kuća, birtija"	Agent tajne sile	4:28
13.	"Fildžan viška"	Fildžan viška	5:38
Total length:			64:20

== Personnel ==
Credits adapted from the album's liner notes.

Zabranjeno Pušenje

- Sejo Sexon – lead vocals, acoustic guitar
- Dragomir Herendić Dragianni – guitar, backing vocals
- Predrag Bobić Bleka – bass, backing vocals
- Branko Trajkov Trak – drums
- Bruno Urlić Prco – violin, keyboards, backing vocals

Additional musicians

- Albin Jarić (credited as Jimi Rasta von Zenica) – percussion

Production

- Sejo Sexon – production
- Zoran Švigir – mastering, mixing engineer (Studio Šišmiš in Velika Gorica, Croatia)
- Dario Vitez – executive production, tour manager
- Mark Burris – recording
- Dragomir Herendić Dragianni – recording, mixing engineer
- Dijana Groth - tour lead

Design

- Dario Vitez – design
- Saša Midžor Sučić – photos
- Branko Trajkov Trak – photos
