= Paul Kempf (musician) =

Croatian keyboardist (born 1977)

- Also known as: DJ Pavo
- Born: October 10, 1977 (age 49); Slavonski Brod, SR Croatia, SFR Yugoslavia
- Genres: Rock; soft jazz
- Occupation: Musician
- Instrument: Keyboards
- Years active: 1988–present

Paul Kempf (born October 10, 1977), also known by his stage name DJ Pavo, is a Croatian keyboardist. He is most notable as a former member of rock band Zabranjeno Pušenje.

== Life and career ==
Kempf was born and raised in Slavonski Brod, SFR Yugoslavia (nowadays Croatia). In 1986, he enrolled a music school in his hometown, where he learns to play piano. By the end of 1980s he competed at an international music competition in Recanati, Italy. He won two first prizes (1988, 1989) and the second prize (1990). During 1990s Kempf performed with many local-known bands, such as Crni Leptir, Voodoo Blues, In The Fall, Prorock, Odie Me, Just The 4 Of Us, Boldrick. In 2002, he joined Istrian band La Piaf and went on the nine-month-long tour to Gran Canaria, Spain. In early 2000s, he also performed with his hometown band Brodolom, as well with Rafael Dropulić, who won the 2003 Story Supernova Music Talents.

In early 2005, Kempf joined famous Bosnian garage rock band Zabranjeno Pušenje. He played on three band's studio albums; Hodi da ti čiko nešto da (2006), Muzej revolucije (2009), Radovi na cesti (2013). In late 2006, alongside fellow band members Sejo Sexon, Robert Boldižar, and Branko Trajkov, he joined newly established supergroup Shaderwan Code. In early 2017, Kempf chose to leave Zabranjeno Pušenje.

== Discography ==
Zabranjeno pušenje

- Hodi da ti čiko nešto da (2006)
- Muzej revolucije (2009)
- Radovi na cesti (2013)

Shaderwan Code

- Kad procvatu behari (2011)
- Ah, što ćemo ljubav kriti (2018)
