= Dejan Orešković =

Croatian record producer and guitarist

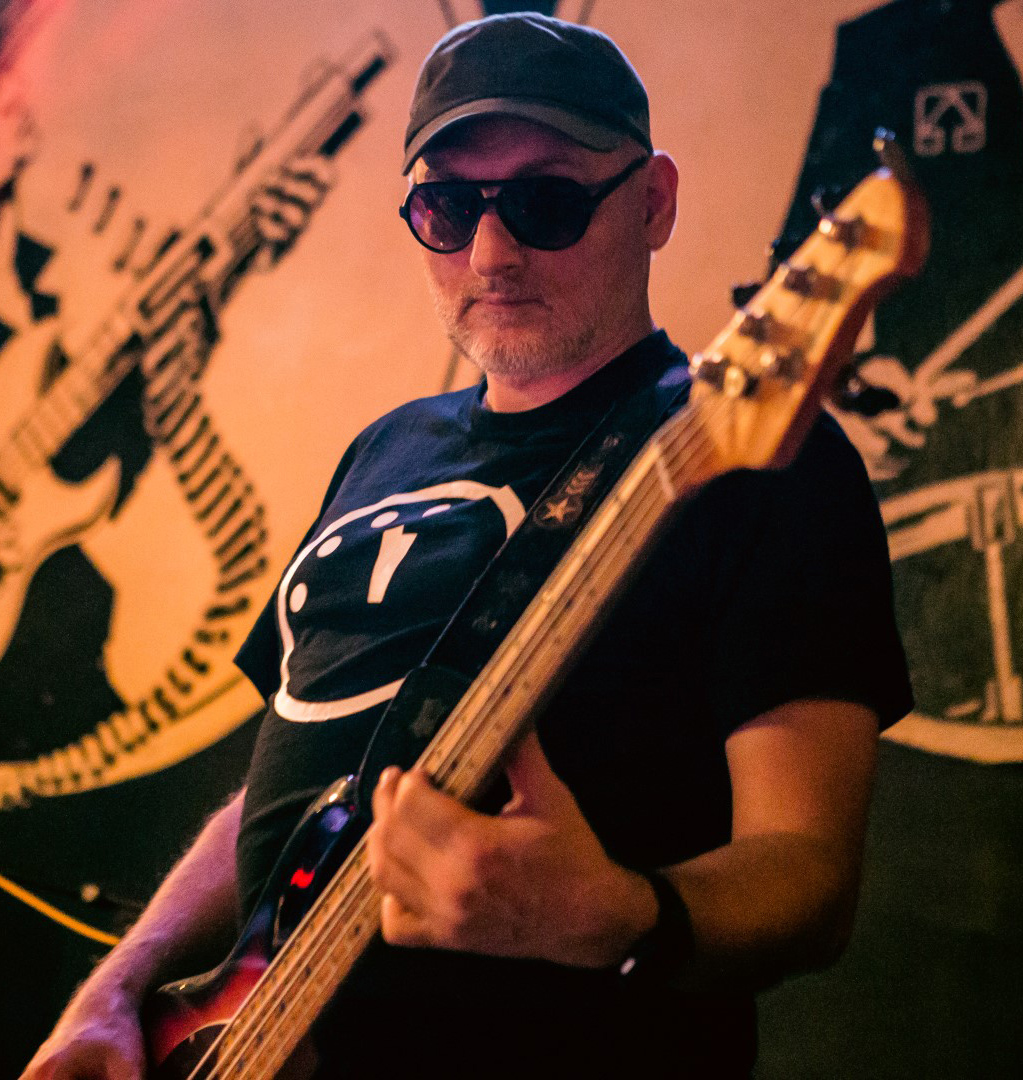
- Dejan Orešković in 2017

Background information
- Also known as: Klo, Klokan
- Born: March 24, 1970 (age 56); Slavonski Brod, SR Croatia, Yugoslavia (now Croatia)
- Genres: rock; garage rock; heavy metal
- Occupations: Musician; producer
- Instrument: Bass guitar
- Years active: 1988–present

Dejan Orešković (born March 24, 1970), also known by his nickname Klo, is a Croatian record producer and guitarist. He is a current member of rock band Zabranjeno Pušenje and a former member of heavy metal band Divlje jagode.

== Life and career ==
Orešković was born and raised in Slavonski Brod, SFR Yugoslavia (nowadays Croatia). At the age of six he went to his first music concert. It was the Bijelo Dugme concert, because his parents were their fans. Shortly thereafter, he had got an acoustic guitar and learned to play the first song "The House of the Rising Sun". By the end of elementary education, he started playing in his first rock band with whom he plays songs of the Rolling Stones and similar rock bands. In the following period, he played in various local bands, and in 1988, he became a member of the most popular local band Casablanca, at that time in a contract with Jugoton.

At the beginning of the Croatian War of Independence he relocated to Munich, Germany. At that time, Orešković worked in a popular disco club where many popular bands and musicians from the former Yugoslavia were performing. He met with them, as well he worked with some of them, like with Dino Dvornik on his live album Live In München. In 1994, he returned to Croatia and settled in Zagreb. Invited by his longtime acquaintance Toni Lović, he became a member of band Hard Time where he played the bass guitar until 1997. In the same year, he joined Divlje jagode through audition. There, he performed on their ninth studio album Od neba do neba (2003). Orešković left the Jagode band in 2005.

From the very beginning of his stay in Zagreb he has worked as a producer or co-producer of songs for musicians or bands such as Meritas, Vanna, Massimo, E.N.I., Žanamari, the Opća opasnost and many others.

=== Zabranjeno pušenje (2008–present) ===
Since 2008, he has been a member of the rock band Zabranjeno Pušenje. He performed on their last four studio albums; Muzej revolucije (2009), Radovi na cesti (2013), Šok i nevjerica (2018), and Karamba! (2022). In 2025, he performed on the band's two live albums, Pušenje ubija and Uživo u Lisinskom.

== Discography ==
Zabranjeno pušenje

- Muzej revolucije (2009)
- Radovi na cesti (2013)
- Šok i nevjerica (2018)
- Live in Skenderija Sarajevo 2018 (2022)
- Karamba! (2022)
- Pušenje ubija (2025)
- Uživo u Lisinskom (2025)

Divlje jagode

- Od neba do neba (2003)
