= Branko Trajkov =

Croatian musician and record producer

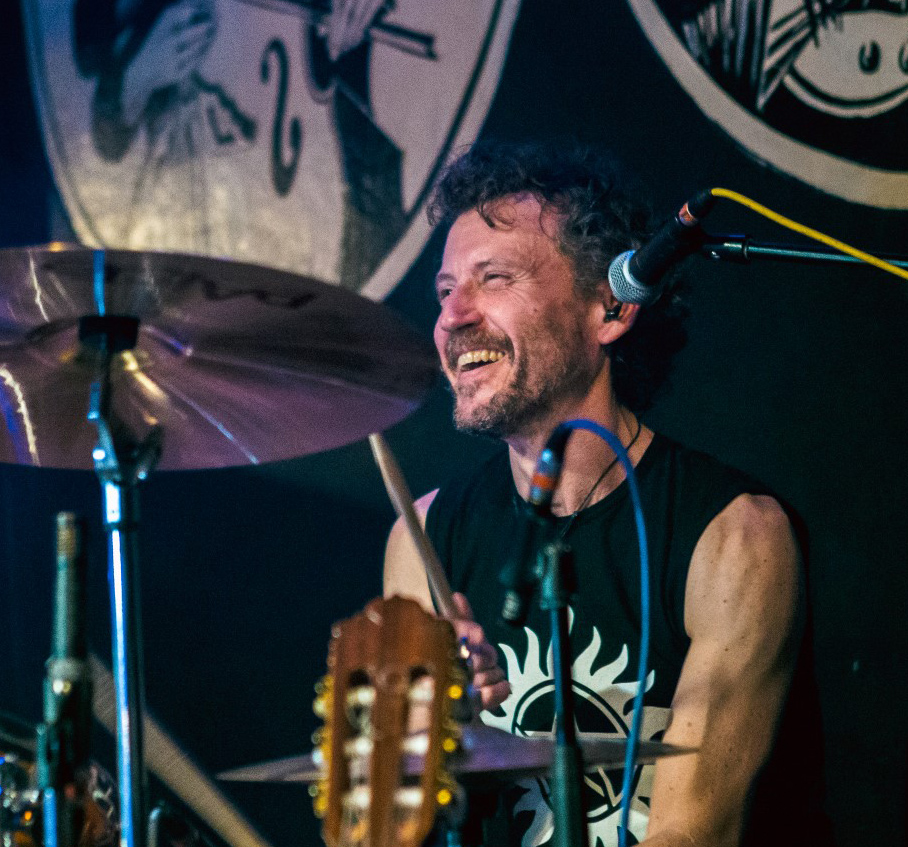
- Branko Trajkov in 2017

Background information
- Also known as: Trak
- Born: October 9, 1966 (age 59); Zagreb, SR Croatia, Yugoslavia
- Genres: Rock and roll; ethno
- Occupations: musician; producer; music therapist; architect
- Instruments: drums; percussion; acoustic guitar; electric guitar; vocals
- Years active: 1985–present

Branko Trajkov (born 9 October 1966), also known by his stage name Trak, is a Croatian musician and record producer who is most notable as the drummer of rock band Zabranjeno Pušenje. Also, he organizes creative and music therapy drum workshops for children and adults.

== Music career ==
As a child, Trajkov was a fan of Bijelo Dugme. His father took him to the 1976 album Eto! Baš hoću! promotion concert in Dom Sportova, Zagreb. There he got motivation for a future occupation. In 1979, he graduated from a lower music school where he had got piano lessons. Later, he self-learned to play a guitar.

In 1983, Trajkov joined a band Karavele, which was a support tour band of rock bands Električni Orgazam and Idoli. After that, in the late 1980s he was member of several rock bands such as Mačke and the Rocket Stars. In 1990, he became a drummer of then established a rockabilly teen bend Fantomi. He left the band after their breakup in 1994.

In 1994, Trajkov got a job at Croatian Radiotelevision, and the next year at the Vatroslav Lisinski Concert Hall. He worked there as a record producer until 1997. In the early 2000s, he joined the 7/8 band, a pit orchestra of Ezerki, a Zagreb-based women's choir that performs traditional Macedonian folk songs. At the same time, he worked with Lidija Bajuk on her four studio albums and perform on some concerts.

In 2011, Trajkov got mandate from Native American tribe Picuris Pueblo to perform their ceremonial dance; the "Sun-Moon Dance". Also, he is a member of the Croatian Freelance Artists' Association.

=== Zabranjeno pušenje (1996–present) ===
Trajkov joined Zabranjeno Pušenje in the fall of 1996. His first performance came on the band concerts in Zagreb and Sarajevo when recordings for the live album Hapsi sve! (1998) happened. After that, he participated in the recording of the sixth studio album Agent tajne sile (1999), as well as all the later ones; Bog vozi Mercedes (2001), Live in St. Louis (2004), Hodi da ti čiko nešto da (2006), Muzej revolucije (2009), Radovi na cesti (2013), Šok i nevjerica (2018), and Karamba! (2022).

In 2025, he performed on the band's two live albums, Pušenje ubija and Uživo u Lisinskom.

Alongside with the Zabranjeno pušenje members Sejo Sexon and Robert Boldižar, Trajkov is a member of the Shaderwan Code. It is a joint group of Zabranjeno pušenje and Zagreb Mosque Choir Arabeske. Trajkov worked on their albums Kad procvatu behari (2011) and Ah, što ćemo ljubav kriti (2018).

=== Mechanical (2019–present) ===
In 2019, Trajkov and Krešimir Jurina founded Mechanical, an alternative, psychedelic, and progressive rock band, joining as a drummer and singer. They have been inspired by the Russian mystics of early 20th century and use the Fourth Way approach in songwriting. In October 2020, the band released its first single titled "Fluorescent Black". In November 2020, the single reached No. 1 in the 47-week on the Free40 Indie Charts.

== Community service ==
Since 2000, Trajkov has been organizing creative and music therapy drum workshops for children and adults with special needs. He created this specific drum workshop to get the energy of music and rhythm into the world of those that the public administration does not always help in the right way. Therefore, the aim of such workshops is to provide participants with a spontaneous and natural way of insight into rhythm, music creation and personal sound experience. During this sessions, he establishes harmonious and solid group based on the hierarchy of sound and rhythm, rather than physical, mental or social predisposition of participants.

In 2000s, Trajkov and his fellow band members of Zabranjeno pušenje took a part in a social responsibility project in which they organized music workshops for children and youth who were victims of land mines. The workshops were taken two times in a year. The winter workshops were held in Kranjska Gora, Slovenia, while the summer workshops were held in Rovinj, Croatia. In 2005, he held music workshops as a part of project "Zemlja bez granica" (transl. A Country Without Borders). In the workshop named "Let's Take Back the Music & Rhythm to Their Age-old Hearths" he guided students to retrieving their rhythm and aligning it with the environment vibrations.

In April 2013, Croatian Ministry of Culture selected Trajkov as the first project leader for their pilot project A Backpack (full) of Culture. Later, he held more than 15 workshops as part of this Ministry's project. Workshops were held in Nova Gradiška, Križevci, Knin, Koprivnica, Metković, Slavonski Brod and other towns. In 2014, Trajkov was appointed as a permanent associate for the Brod-Posavina County Institute of Public Health. As of 2018, he held nearly 25 active music therapy sessions for addicts in Slavonski Brod. In 2015, a Croatian printing company Školska knjiga appointed him as an expert associate for their Department of Music Education. He held the same workshop during many professional meetings of school teachers in Croatian towns, such as Kutina, Senj, Čakovec, Jastrebarsko, Beli Manastir.

In more than 15 years, Trajkov organized more than hundred drum workshops in almost every major city and town in Croatia.

== Personal life ==
Trajkov was born and raised in Zagreb, nowadays in Croatia. His father Stojan plays accordion. He is of Macedonian descent. Trajkov earned his bachelor's degree in architectural engineering from the University of Zagreb in 1994.

== Discography ==
Zabranjeno pušenje

- Hapsi sve! (1998)
- Agent tajne sile (1999)
- Bog vozi Mercedes (2001)
- Live in St. Louis (2004)
- Hodi da ti čiko nešto da (2006)
- Muzej revolucije (2009)
- Radovi na cesti (2013)
- Šok i nevjerica (2018)
- Live in Skenderija Sarajevo 2018 (2022)
- Karamba! (2022)
- Pušenje ubija (2025)
- Uživo u Lisinskom (2025)

Shaderwan Code

- Kad procvatu behari (2011)
- Ah, što ćemo ljubav kriti (2018)

Ezerki & 7/8

- Livingroom (2003)
- Baknež (2006)

Lidija Bajuk

- Kneja (1999)
- Luna (2005)
- Matapur (2010)
- Zipčica (2010)

Fantomi

- Sretan rođendan (1992)
- Planeta majmuna (1993)
- Lice (1995)

Pun Kufer

- Preko Zebre (1999)
- Dok mi grizeš prste (2002)
