= Muzej revolucije =

Studio album by Zabranjeno Pušenje
- Released: November 7, 2009
- Recorded: 2008–2009
- Studio: Plavi Film, Zagreb, Croatia
- Genre: Rock; new wave
- Length: 54:44
- Language: Bosnian
- Label: Hayat Production; Croatia Records; Vijesti; Long Play
- Producer: Sejo Sexon; Toni Lović

Zabranjeno Pušenje chronology
The Ultimate Collection (2009)	Muzej revolucije (2009)	Radovi na cesti (2013)

Singles from Muzej revolucije
- 1. "Modni Guru" Released: October 2, 2009; 2. "Kladimo se" Released: May 14, 2010; 3. "Kada Sena pleše" Released: April 4, 2011; 4. "Tvoja bosa stopala" Released: September 28, 2011; 5. "Samir-time" Released: June 25, 2012

Muzej revolucije (transl. Museum of the Revolution) is the ninth studio album by Bosnian rock band Zabranjeno Pušenje, released through Hayat Production in Bosnia and Herzegovina, Croatia Records in Croatia, Vijesti in Montenegro, and Long Play in Serbia, on November 7, 2009. It was released on the 92nd anniversary of the October Revolution.

== Critical reception ==
Professional ratings
Review scores
Source	Rating
Tportal	9/10 stars
Muzika.hr	3.5/5 stars
BalkanRock	3.5/5 stars

Muzej revolucije received favorable reviews from critics. D. Jagatić of Tportal gave the album an 9 out of 10 album, stating that "all songs on the album have this unique power, specific for the Bosnian humor, and sense of justice". Zoran Tučkar of Muzika.hr gave the album a positive review, stating that it will bring a revolution to the region, to former Yugoslavia, but could, through a harsh and unambiguous critique, encourage young people and young rock bands not to consume the fruits of divine capitalism thinking, but loud and clear they say how things stand.

== Track listing ==
Source: Discogs

No.	Title	Writer(s)	Arranger(s)	Length
1.	"Muzej revolucije" (Museum of the Revolution)	Davor Sučić; Antun Lović		4:58
2.	"Modni Guru" (Fashion Guru)	Mario Vestić	Lović	3:50
3.	"Kladimo se" (We Bet)	Vestić	Lović	4:23
4.	"Samir-time" (Samir's Time)	Sučić; Lović		5:37
5.	"Prigodne riječi" (A Few Words)	Sučić; Lović		4:47
6.	"Express Folky Star"	Sučić; Lović; Mirko Srdić		2:53
7.	"Kada Sena pleše" (When Sena is dancing)	Sučić; Lović		4:18
8.	"Ustanova" (The Institution)	Sučić; Lović; Robert Boldižar	Sučić; Lović; Boldižar	4:38
9.	"Tvoja bosa stopala" (Your Bare Feet)	Sučić; Lović	Sučić	4:49
10.	"U gradu gdje nisam rođen" (In a city where I wasn't born)	Sučić; Lović		5:07
11.	"Tijesno" (Tight)	Sučić; Lović	Sučić; Lović	3:31
12.	"Nije to (Čuva Bog Želju svog)" (That's Not It (God Save Željo))	Sučić; Lović		4:26
Total length:				54:44

== Personnel ==
Credits adapted from the album's liner notes.

Zabranjeno Pušenje

- Sejo Sexon – lead vocals, guitar, backing vocals
- Toni Lović – electric guitar, acoustic guitar, backing vocals
- Branko Trajkov Trak – drums, percussion, backing vocals
- Robert Boldižar – violin, keyboards, backing vocals
- Paul Kempf – keyboards
- Dejan Orešković Klo – bass

Additional musicians

- Ante Prgin Surka – drums (track 7), trumpet (tracks 4, 7)
- Stipe Božinović Mađor – drums (track 5)
- Nenad Mlinarić Mlinka – drums (track 1)

Production

- Sejo Sexon – production
- Toni Lović – sound engineering, programming, audio mixing, production (Studio Plavi Film in Zagreb, Croatia)
- Dario Vitez – executive production
- John Davis – mastering (Metropolis Mastering in London, UK)

Design

- Anur Hadžiomerspahić – design and layout (Ideologija Creative Agency in Sarajevo, BIH)
- Saša Midžor Sučić – photos
