= Freddy Nagel =

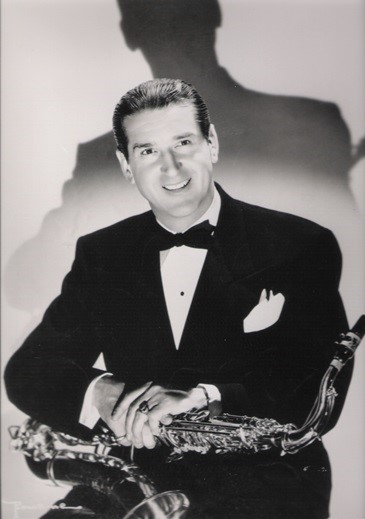

Background information
- Born: February 25, 1908; Berkeley, California
- Died: June 6, 1999 (aged 91) Lassen County, California
- Genres: Big band, swing
- Occupations: Bandleader, musician, vocalist
- Instrument: Saxophone
- Years active: 1935–1950
- Labels: Vitacoustic, Raymor

Freddy Nagel (February 25, 1908 – June 6, 1999) was an American bandleader. His band frequented dance halls throughout the United States during the big band era and reached a wide audience on national CBS and Mutual Radio big band remotes throughout the 1940s.

== Early life ==
Fredric H. Nagel Jr., was born on February 25, 1908, to Fredric H. and Elyda Nagel (née Ives) in Berkeley, California. He taught himself to play the harmonica and other instruments at a young age. After the bandmaster gave him one to repair, he learned to play the saxophone at Tamalpais High School in Mill Valley, where he was valedictorian at his graduation in 1926. His sisters also graduated from Tam High, Audrey in 1928, and Faith in 1935. He attended the University of Nevada at Reno. He transferred to Stanford University, where he majored in electrical engineering and was a member of Sigma Nu.

== The Freddy Nagel Orchestra ==
=== First band (1935–1939) ===
Nagel provided the music for Stanford's musicals from 1934 to 1936. He formed a campus orchestra, which became the first incarnation of his band.

From 1935 to 1939, the band played at the Hotel Del Monte in Monterey. Nagel signed with MCA Booking and toured internationally on Dollar and Matson Cruise Lines. Nagel, Norman Gehre, and Grayce Joyce provided the vocals; Greig McRitchie was trumpeter and organizer of Nagel's arrangements. The band often played "The White Star of Sigma Nu," a song from Nagel's college days.

=== Second band (1939-c.1944) ===
MCA, Nagel's management company, pressured Nagel to change the band's musical style to that of the more commercial Sammy Kaye, Kay Kyser, and Blue Barron bands in 1939. In doing so, Nagel eliminated the violins and replaced most of the band members. The new band featured a vocal quartet of Ken Jackson, Alan Overend, Bob Locken, and Barbara Carroll. Larry Hooper, future star of The Lawrence Welk Show, joined the band in 1942 as a piano player. Harriet Kay, Jimmy Kendall, Anita Boyer (billed as Virginia Bell) appeared.

This second band was more successful than the first, though one music critic suggested Nagel develop his own style.

Now based out of Chicago, the band received significant radio time over WGN as it played in the Aragon and Trianon ballrooms regularly. The band appeared on the popular radio show The Fitch Bandwagon in September 1940.

The band played at the major ballrooms of the day, including The Chase Hotel and Casa Loma Ballroom in St. Louis, the Palmer House Hotel in Chicago, the Mark Hopkins and Palace Hotel in San Francisco, the Baker in Dallas, the Peabody in Memphis, the Wilshire Bowl in Los Angeles, and elsewhere in the Midwest and along the south and west coasts.

Nagel joined the military in 1943 and entertained the troops with a military band. Bandleader George Hamilton took over the second band, but it soon disbanded under Hamilton's mismanagement.

=== Third band (1945–1950) ===
The third and best-remembered incarnation of the band came about when Nagel returned to civilian life and the band late in 1945. He adopted a new signature song, Will Hudson's "Sophisticated Swing". This swing band favored Latin-American songs and recorded several singles. The band continued performing in hotel ballrooms, with some performances broadcast by ABC and others.

The band's featured singers included three singers from the previous incarnation of the band: Allan Overend, Bob Locken, and Ken Jackson, plus Lorraine Benson (formerly of the Orrin Tucker band). When Benson left the band to marry bandleader Ray Herbeck, Patti Page briefly took her place, providing the vocals on one single, "My Heart Is a Hobo", before June Howard (formerly of Henry King band) replaced her. Peggy Lee sang with the band in Las Vegas in 1946.

Nagel, though still popular with audiences in the late 1940s, was panned by music critics for adding too many gimmicks, such as firemen's hoses, fake mustaches and noses, and other comedic, visual elements to his shows. "Nobody liked us but the customers," Nagel later said.

== Later life ==
Nagel disbanded the band in 1950, though he would occasionally perform publicly throughout the rest of his life. He moved to Susanville, California, where he and his wife, Barbara (née Rand), raised three children and owned a ranch.

Nagel died on June 6, 1999, in Lassen County, California.

== Recordings ==
Nagel signed with Vitacoustic within a month of its start in March 1947 and recorded several singles. When Vitacoustic folded less than a year later, Nagel purchased the masters for $800. Then Ray McCollister of Raymor McCollister Music released some of those songs and others under the Raymor label.

=== Singles ===
- "My Heart is a Hobo" (Vocal by Patti Page). From the Paramount picture Welcome Stranger/"I Won't Be Home Anymore When You Call" (Vocals by Ted Travers). Vitacoustic 4. Released May 1947.
- "If You Knew Susie (Like I Know Susie")/"Sophisticated Swing". Vitacoustic 10. Released August 1947.
- "Mary Lou"/"Smile Medley" (Vocal by Jimmy Jett). Vitacoustic 21. Released c. February 1948.
- "Maybe I'm Dreaming" (Vocal by Louise Saunders)/"Honkin' the Horn for Honey." Vocals by Don Dalen and Glee Club. Raymor Records 5003. Released August 1948.
- "Forever in My Heart"/"Add a Little Love". Raymor Records 5004. Released c. October 1948.
- "Sophisticated Swing"/"I'm Head over Heels in Love". Raymor 5006. Released c. January 1949.
- "Mama's Gone, Goodbye"/"Why Did I Fall for You?" Raymor 5007. Released 1949.
- "Pavanne"/"Forever in My Heart". Raymor 5008. Released c. 1949.

=== Albums ===
- Freddy Nagel and His Famous Orchestra: "America's Sweetest and Smoothest Band." Raymor Records.
  - "I'm Head over Heels in Love"
  - "Mama's Gone, Goodbye"
  - "Honkin' the Horn for Honey"
  - "Maybe I'm Dreaming"
  - "Forever in My Heart"
  - "Why Did I Fall for You?"
  - "Sophisticated Swing"
  - "Add a Little Love"
  - "Your Eyes Are Stars"
  - "Pavanne"
- The Hotel Bands. Golden Era Records. [197-?]
  - "Scarf dance"
