= American International School of Zagreb =

School following the United States education system in Zagreb, Croatia

- Američka međunarodna škola u Zagrebu

Location
- Ul. Damira Tomljanovića 3 Zagreb–Novi Zagreb 10020; Croatia; 45°46′56.38″N 15°59′20.73″E

Information
- Type: Private
- Established: May 1966; 60 years ago
- Chair: Richard Trey Lyons
- Director: Darin Fahrney
- Principal: Stephen Dexter (Upper School); Doreen Garrigan (Lower School)
- Grades: Pre-K–12
- Gender: Co-ed
- Age range: 3–19
- Enrollment: 355
- Campus: Urban
- Campus size: 30,000 square metres (3.0 ha)
- Colours: Blue; White
- Athletics conference: CEESA
- Team name: Bears
- School fees: € 9,500 – 20,700 (US$ 7,270 – 19,550)
- Website: www.aisz.hr

The American International School of Zagreb (Croatian: Američka međunarodna škola u Zagrebu) is an international school located in Zagreb, Croatia, founded in 1966.

== About ==
AIS Zagreb has a current enrollment of 355 students, from pre-kindergarten to 12th grade, representing 35 countries. The school is governed by a five-member School Board; three of the members, including the board chair, are appointed by the United States Ambassador and two members are elected by the members of the PTA (Parent Teacher Association). Students who graduate from AISZ earn an American Diploma; in addition, students can also earn an International Baccalaureate Diploma.

Students in middle school and high school have the opportunity to participate in the following CEESA athletics and activities: MS boys and girls cross country, MS boys soccer, HS boys soccer, HS HOSIC, MS Speech and Debate, MS Mathcounts, MS Knowledge Bowl, HS Knowledge Bowl, MS boys and girls basketball, HS boys and girls basketball, MS Cultural Arts Festival, MS boys and girls volleyball, HS boys and girls tennis.

AISZ is accredited by the Middle States Association of Colleges and Schools. In November 2013 a Validation Team representing the Middle States Association (MSA) visited AISZ to review and verify the work of the school's self-study done by the school's Planning Team. The Validation Team confirmed that AISZ meets the 12 standards set by the MSA and, as a result, AISZ has been re-accredited until 2020.

AISZ is also authorized by the International Baccalaureate Organization to offer the IB Diploma Program in grades 11 and 12. The IB Diploma is a rigorous academic program recognized by most universities around the world.

== Memberships ==
AISZ is a member of:

- Academy of International School Heads (AISH);
- Association for the Advancement of International Education (AAIE);
- Central and Eastern European Schools Association (CEESA);
- Council for Advancement and Support of Education (CASE)
- Council of International Schools (CIS);
- European Council of International Schools (ECIS);
- International Baccalaureate (IB);
- Principals Training Center (PTC).

== Faculty ==
- Lana Škrgatić, US and IB music teacher and choir teacher
