= Karamba! =

Album by Bosnian rock band Zabranjeno Pušenje

Studio album by Zabranjeno Pušenje
- Released: June 3, 2022
- Recorded: 2020–2021
- Studio: Plavi Film, Zagreb, Croatia
- Genre: Rock
- Length: 67:10
- Language: Bosnian
- Label: Tropik
- Producer: Sejo Sexon; Toni Lović

Zabranjeno Pušenje chronology
Šok i nevjerica (2022)	Karamba! (2022)	Pušenje ubija (2025)

Singles from Karamba!
- 1. "Korona hit pozitivan" Released: June 18, 2020; 2. "Ekrem" Released: June 1, 2022

Karamba! (transl. Caramba!) is the twelfth studio album by Bosnian rock band Zabranjeno Pušenje, released through Zenica-based records Tropik and streaming platforms on June 3, 2022.

== Recording and production ==
In 2020 and 2021, the band recorded sixteen new songs for the double album in the Plavi Film Studio in Zagreb, Croatia. The arrangement of all songs on the album was jointly signed by Sejo Sexon, Toni Lović, and all other members of the group. The only guest on the album is Croatian blues musician and harmonica player Tomislav Goluban. The band is collaborating with Elvis J. Kurtović on this album for the first time after a 15-year break. Elvis J. Kurtović was a band member during the 1990s.

One of the authors of the song "Ne okreći se sine" (transl. Don't Look Back, My Son), Goran Kostić, died in 2017.

== Release and promotion ==
The band announced the double album with a new single and music video for the song "Ekrem". The music video was directed by Tomislav Fiket and the actor Asim Ugljen is in the title character of Ekrem.

Previously, in June 2020, a music video was released for the song "Korona hit pozitivan" (transl. Coronavirus hit positive). The song was made in collaboration with Elvis J. Kurtović, a former band member, and was added to the album.

== Track listing ==
Source: ZAMP, Discogs

Disc One
No.	Title	Writer(s)	Length
1.	"Čovjek starog kova" (Old-fashioned Man)	Davor Sučić; Toni Lović	4:46
2.	"Uzdignuta čela" (Proudly)	Sučić; Lović	4:28
3.	"Ne okreći se sine" (Don't Look Back, My Son)	Goran Kostić; Nenad Pejčić; Sučić; Lović	3:00
4.	"Ratna generacija" (A War Generation)	Sučić; Lović	4:16
5.	"Korona hit pozitivan" (Coronavirus hit positive)	Mirko Srdić; Sučić; Lović	4:25
6.	"Ekrem" (Ekrem)	Sučić; Lović	4:07
7.	"Dobar čovjek" (A Good Man)	Sučić; Lović; Tomislav Andrić	4:03
8.	"Blues predsjednika opštine" (The Mayor's Blues)	Sučić; Lović; Nenad Veličković	5:14
Total length:			34:19

Disc Two
No.	Title	Writer(s)	Length
1.	"Štrajk" (The Strike)	Sučić; Srdić; Lović	2:03
2.	"Polovni Fender i napuknuti Shure" (Used Fender and Cracked Shure)	Sučić; Lović	4:28
3.	"Crna vrata" (The Black Door)	Sučić; Lović	4:19
4.	"Ispod radara" (Under the Radar)	Sučić; Lović	4:51
5.	"Novi je vijek" (It is a New Age)	Srdić; Sučić; Lović	5:11
6.	"Kažu da sam puk'o" (They Say I Broke)	Sučić; Srdić; Lović	3:06
7.	"Vrijeme igrača" (Player Time)	Sučić; Lović	4:04
8.	"Pravda za Vedrana" (The Justice For Vedran)	Sučić; Lović	4:49
Total length:			32:51

== Personnel ==
Zabranjeno pušenje

- Sejo Sexon – lead vocals, backing vocals
- Toni Lović – electric guitar, acoustic guitar
- Branko Trajkov Trak – drums, percussion, backing vocals
- Robert Boldižar – violin, cello, keyboards, backing vocals
- Dejan Orešković Klo – bass
- Anđela Zebec – vocals, backing vocals, percussion

Additional musicians

- Tomislav Goluban – harmonica (tracks Disc One: 6; Disc Two: 1, 2, 5)

Production

- Sejo Sexon – production, arrangement
- Toni Lović – production, arrangement, programming, sound engineering, audio mixing, mastering
- Dejan Orešković – arrangement
- Robert Boldižar – arrangement
- Branko Trajkov – arrangement
- Dario Vitez – executive production
- Mateo Patekar – technician
- Krešimir Jurina – technician
- Domagoj Marušić "Brada" – technician

Design

- Tomislav Fiket – design
- Ideologija (design studio in Sarajevo, BH) – layout
- Saša Midžor Sučić – photos
