= Lana Škrgatić =

Croatian singer-songwriter and music pedagogue

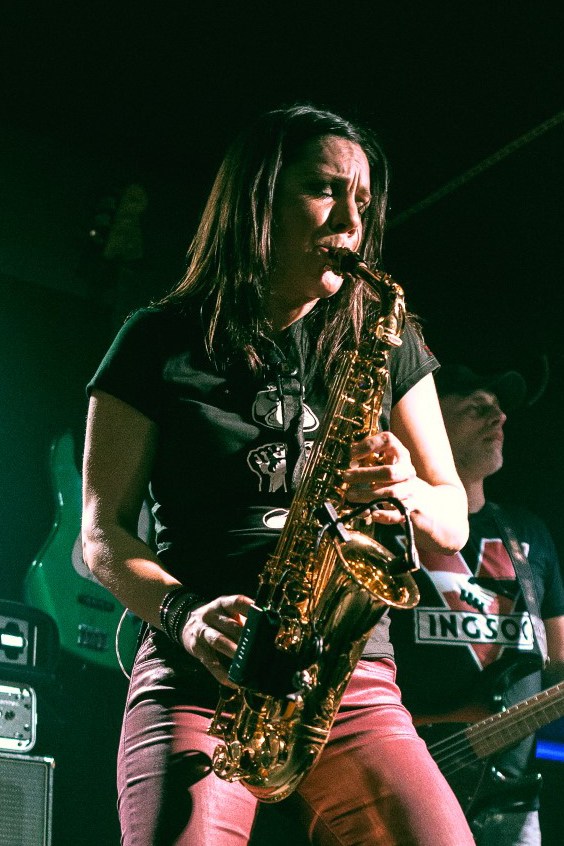
- Lana Škrgatić in 2017

Background information
- Also known as: Lana.S
- Born: November 9, 1980 (age 45); Zagreb, SR Croatia, Yugoslavia
- Genres: Classical; rock; Pop; Garage Rock
- Occupations: Singer; songwriter; composer; music teacher; drama teacher
- Instruments: Vocals; saxophone; concert flute; keyboards
- Years active: 1985–present
- Label: Croatia Records

Lana Škrgatić (born November 9, 1980), also known by her stage name Lana.S, is a Croatian musician, singer-songwriter, and music pedagogue. She is a music and drama teacher at the American International School of Zagreb. She was educated at the Purcell School and the Royal Scottish Academy. She is the founder of the women's music band C.U.R.E., occasional member of rock band Crvena Jabuka, and a former member of the rock band Zabranjeno Pušenje.

== Life and career ==
Škrgatić was born and raised in Zagreb, SFR Yugoslavia (nowadays Croatia) and educated in the United Kingdom. At the age of five she joined a children's choir Trešnjevački mališani. Soon, her talent came to the fore so she had solo performance of the song "Buba Mara" at their album Mi smo djeca vesela (1987).

Škrgatić began playing the piano at the age of six and subsequently moved to London at the age of 11 (1991), for the purpose of studying at the Purcell School of Music. At the time, she was a flutist for the London Youth Orchestra (1997–1999). She won the piano first prize at the 1998 North London Music Competition. In 1999, she has played role of Nancy in an English musical Oliver!. In 1999, Škrgatić received a scholarship to the Royal Scottish Academy of Music and Drama in Glasgow. Additionally, during his time in college, she was a flutist for the Glasgow Royal Academy Orchestra. She earned her master's degree in music in 2003.

In 2004, Škrgatić returned to Zagreb and joined the Komedija Zagreb Theatre Orchestra. In August 2005, she became a music teacher at the American International School of Zagreb.

In January 2016, Škrgatić joined rock band Zabranjeno Pušenje as a saxophonist and flutist. As a new band member, she appeared for the first time in the 2016 music video for song "Klasa optimist" from album Radovi na cesti (2013). Škrgatić performed on their eleventh studio albums Šok i nevjerica (2018). In November 2019, she had parted ways with the Pušenje. She continues to work with the female music band C.U.R.E.

In March 2021, Škrgatić released her first single "Naš svijet" (transl. Our World) under the stage name Lana.S. Also, she has been making her debut album which will be out in summer 2021.

== Discography ==
Zabranjeno pušenje

- Šok i nevjerica (2018)
- Live in Skenderija Sarajevo 2018 (2022)

Crvena Jabuka

- Nocturno (2020)
