= Šok i nevjerica =

Studio album by Zabranjeno Pušenje
- Released: October 31, 2018
- Recorded: 2017–2018
- Studio: Plavi Film, Zagreb, Croatia
- Genre: Rock
- Length: 59:18
- Language: Bosnian
- Label: Tropik; Menart
- Producer: Sejo Sexon; Toni Lović

Zabranjeno Pušenje chronology
Radovi na cesti (2013)	Šok i nevjerica (2018)	Karamba! (2022)

Singles from Šok i nevjerica
- 1. "Nova godina" Released: December 11, 2017; 2. "Irska" Released: October 19, 2018; 3. "Kupi nas Ali" Released: Jun 17, 2019

Šok i nevjerica (transl. Shock and Disbelief) is the eleventh studio album by Bosnian rock band Zabranjeno Pušenje, released through Tropik in Bosnia and Herzegovina and Menart in Croatia and Serbia, on October 31, 2018.

== Recording and production ==
In 2017 and early 2018, the band recorded fourteen new songs in the Plavi Film studio in Zagreb, Croatia. The arrangement of all songs on the album was jointly signed by all members of the group. The song "Kupi nas Ali" was recorded with Bosnian rapper Sassja, while the song "Svjetla Sarajeva" was recorded with Damir Imamović, Bosnian singer and composer of Bosnian folk music.

== Release and promotion ==
On December 11, 2017, the band released a music video on its YouTube channel for the first single from the album, "Nova godina". Music videos for "Kupi nas Ali" and "Irska" followed. On October 19, 2018, the band released the video on its YouTube channel for the second single, "Irska".

== Track listing ==
Source: ZAMP

No.	Title	Writer(s)	Length
1.	"Svjetla Sarajeva" (The Lights Of Sarajevo)	Davor Sučić; Goran Vračar	5:16
2.	"Kupi nas Ali" (Sold to Ali)	Sučić; Nenad Veličković; Sanela Halilović	4:10
3.	"Irska" (Ireland)	Sučić; Toni Lović; Tomislav Andrić	3:47
4.	"Trener" (Coach)	Sučić; Dario Kovač	3:12
5.	"Bosman - Prvi bosanski superjunak" (Bosman - The First Bosnian Superhero)	Sučić; Lana Škrgatić; Andrić	3:40
6.	"Upuc'o sam šerifa Buzu" (I Shot Sheriff Buzo)	Sučić; Andrić	4:01
7.	"Gospođa Senada" (Madam Senada)	Sučić; Andrić	5:04
8.	"Poljubi je budalo" (Kiss Her, Fool)	Sučić; Andrić	3:35
9.	"Mahala u magli" (City in the Fog)	Lović; Sučić	3:51
10.	"Klupa na kojoj piše Kenan" (The Bench That Reads Kenan)	Sučić	4:11
11.	"Ko?" (Who?)	Škrgatić; Sučić; Andrić; Vračar	5:08
12.	"Nova godina" (New Year's Eve)	Sučić; Lović; Kovač	4:46
13.	"Amilina pjesma" (Amila's Song)	Sučić; Andrić	4:15
14.	"Sve po starom" (Same Old, Same Old)	Sučić; Vračar	4:22
Total length:			59:18

== Personnel ==
Zabranjeno pušenje

- Sejo Sexon – lead vocals, backing vocals
- Toni Lović – electric guitar, acoustic guitar
- Branko Trajkov Trak – drums, percussion, backing vocals
- Robert Boldižar – violin, cello, keyboards, backing vocals
- Dejan Orešković Klo – bass
- Lana Škrgatić – keyboards, saxophone, flute, backing vocals

Additional musicians

- Sanela Halilović "Sassja" – vocals (track 2)
- Damir Imamović – tambur, vocals (track 1)

Production

- Sejo Sexon – production, arrangement
- Toni Lović – programming, sound engineering, audio mixing, production, arrangement
- Dejan Orešković – mastering, programming, sound engineering, audio mixing, arrangement
- Đani Pervan – programming, sound engineering, audio mixing
- Dario Vitez – executive production
- Robert Boldižar – arrangement
- Branko Trajkov – arrangement
- Lana Škrgatić – arrangement

Design

- Ideologija (design studio in Sarajevo, BH) – design and layout
- Saša Midžor Sučić – photos
