= Dario Vitez =

Croatian music manager

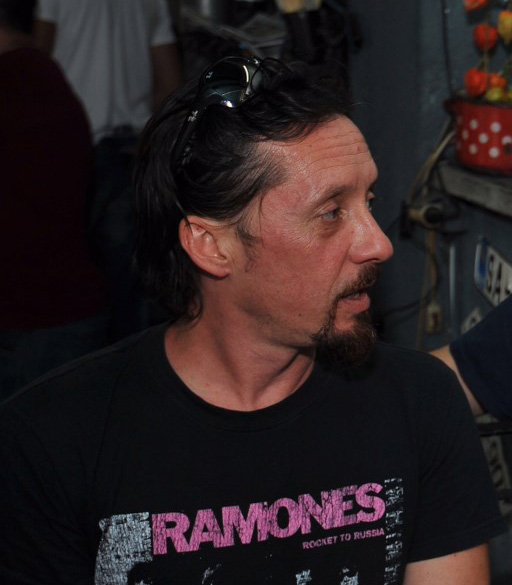
- Dario Vitez

Background information
- Born: January 17, 1973 (age 53); Zagreb, SR Croatia, SFR Yugoslavia
- Occupations: Record producer; artist manager; executive producer; public relations; tour manager; designer
- Years active: 1996–present

Dario Vitez (born January 17, 1973) is a Croatian music manager, public relations specialist, record producer and designer. He is most notable as a music manager, executive producer and public relations manager of the rock band Zabranjeno Pušenje.

== Early life ==
Vitez was born and raised in Zagreb, Yugoslavia (nowadays Croatia). He earned his high school diploma from the MIOC in 1991. Also, he played a clarinet in music school. Vitez graduated in mechanical engineering from the University of Zagreb, but did not fulfil all requirements for an academic degree.

== Music manager career ==
In 1996, Vitez formed his own concert and public relations company, named Dik-koncert.

=== Zabranjeno pušenje (1997–present) ===
Since 1997, Vitez has been an executive producer, public relations manager and tour manager for Zabranjeno Pušenje, a rock band formed in Sarajevo in 1980.

As an executive producer, Vitez worked on all Zabranjeno pušenje album releases since 1998, such as Hapsi sve! (1998), Agent tajne sile (1999), Bog vozi Mercedes (2001), Live in St. Louis (2004), Hodi da ti čiko nešto da (2006), Muzej revolucije (2009), Radovi na cesti (2013), Šok i nevjerica (2018), and Karamba! (2022). Additionally, he designed or co–designed album covers on three albums: Hapsi sve!, Agent tajne sile and Bog vozi Mercedes.

In 1997, Vitez organized two guest appearances of Rambo Amadeus at the Zabranjeno pušenje concerts for the Fildžan viška album promotion in Sarajevo. Those appearances were the first post-war performance by a Serbian-Montenegrin artist to the Bosnian Federation.

=== Other artists ===
Vitez was a concert manager and public relations manager in Croatia for a Serbian rock band Bajaga & Instruktori from 2004 to 2009. On November 24, 2004, there was a concert for their 20th Band Anniversary at the Dom sportova in Zagreb. For their 2005 studio album Šou počinje u ponoć promotion there was two big concerts in Croatia, at the Arena Gripe in Split on December 29, 2005 and at the Dom sportova in Zagreb on April 27, 2006. In 2009, there was two concerts for their 25th Band anniversary at the Dražen Petrović Basketball Hall in Zagreb, on November 20 and 21.

Vitez was a promoter and tour manager of a Bosnian rock singer Elvir Laković Laka, the Bosnia and Herzegovina entrant at the Eurovision Song Contest 2008. From 2008 to 2010, he was a booking agent for the area of former Yugoslavia, except Bosnia. Vitez was an exclusive booking agent of the Cvetličarna nightclub in Ljubljana, Slovenia, from 2007 to 2009. On June 4, 2009, Vitez organized 30th Band Anniversary Concert of rock band Prljavo kazalište at the Križanke Outdoor Theatre in Ljubljana.

Since 1996, he organized or booked concerts for many rock, rap and pop artists, such as: Public Enemy, Darko Rundek, Dino Dvornik, Kemal Monteno, Hladno pivo, Vlatko Stefanovski, Plavi orkestar, Majke, KUD Idijoti, Lačni Franz, Psihomodo pop, Colonia, Mostar Sevdah Reunion, Esma Redžepova, Vatra and many others.

== Awards and nominations ==
Year	Nominated work	Category	Award	Result	Notes	Ref.
2002	Bog vozi Mercedes	Album cover design	Davorin	Won	with Srđan Velimirović	
2003	www.zabranjeno-pusenje.com	Music website design	Davorin	Won		
