= Tomislav Goluban =

Croatian blues singer-songwriter

- Goluban in 2024

Background information
- Born: 16 December 1976 (age 49); Zabok, SR Croatia, Yugoslavia (nowadays Croatia)
- Genre: Blues rock
- Occupations: musician; composer; singer-songwriter; educator; radio DJ
- Instruments: harmonica; vocals
- Years active: 1999–present
- Labels: Aquarius Records; Spona; Croatia Records; Menart Records; Blue Heart Records; Delta Note
- Member of: Zabranjeno Pušenje
- Website: goluban.com

Tomislav Goluban (born 16 December 1976) is a Croatian blues musician, composer, and harmonica player.

He has released seventeen studio albums and two live albums, winning nine Porin Awards and three Status Awards of the Croatian Musicians Union. Over the course of his career, he has performed in more than twenty countries across two continents (Europe and the United States). In 2005, he placed fourth at the World Harmonica Championship in Germany and became an official endorser of the harmonica manufacturer Hohner. In mid-2022, he joined the rock band Zabranjeno Pušenje.

For his artistic and pedagogical work, he received the Certificate of Appreciation of the City of Zabok (2011) and the Plaque of Krapina-Zagorje County (2010).

== Music career ==
Goluban began playing the harmonica in 1997, inspired by the music of the old blues masters and his collection of blues albums. Over time, he sought to combine country, blues, and Croatian traditional music in his work.

In 2005, he placed fourth at the World Harmonica Championship in Germany, becoming the only Croatian promoter of the renowned harmonica manufacturer Hohner. For his outstanding contribution to harmonica performance, he received the Fender Mega Music Award in 2009, and again in 2012 in the category of musical collaboration, together with Zdenka Kovačiček. He was also the first Croatian representative at the International Blues Challenge in Memphis, Tennessee (2009).

Between 2009 and 2025, Goluban recorded five albums in the United States with musicians from Chicago, Memphis, and Nashville, Tennessee, achieving high positions on international blues radio charts, including third place in Australia, sixth on the global Top 50, and first in Chicago and Illinois.

His fourth album, 200$ SUN Memphis Album (2010), was recorded at the legendary Sun Studio in Memphis during his participation at the blues competition. The album features 12 songs and over 25 minutes of documentary film footage from Memphis, including the first music video from the record for the song "Grabrovec – Tennessee". Grammy Awards winner Matt Ross-Spang also contributed to the production. Goluban's sixth studio album, Blow Junkie (2014), reached 49th place on the worldwide Roots Music Report blues chart.

His tenth studio album, Chicago Rambler (2019), recorded live over two afternoons in January 2018 with a team of Chicago musicians, spent 12 weeks on the Top 50 Blues Albums chart of Roots Music Report. It reached third place on the blues charts in Australia, sixth on the Top 50 Blues Albums category, and first place in Chicago and Illinois. The record was ranked among the five best Chicago blues albums of 2019, 61st on the annual worldwide best blues albums list, and earned a nomination for the Independent Blues Award 2020 in the category of Contemporary Album of the Year.

His eleventh album, Memphis Light (2020), spent 11 weeks on the Top 50 Blues Albums, reached 38th on the Top 200 Contemporary Blues Album Chart – Year of 2020 and 69th on the overall Top 200 Blues Album Chart – Year of 2020 according to Roots Music Report. It was nominated for a Porin Award in the category of Best Rock Album, as well as for the Independent Blues Award for Contemporary Album of the Year. The album received positive critical acclaim, with Dubravko Jagatić of a Croatian weekly news magazine Nacional describing it as "a superb blues album."

The twelfth studio album, Express Connection (2021), Goluban's first release under the US label Blue Heart Records, spent 14 weeks on the Top 50 Blues Albums, peaking at fifth position. It also reached 31st on the Top 200 Contemporary Blues Albums and 52nd on the general Top 200 Blues Albums list for 2021. In France, it placed 39th on the Top 50 Albums of Collectif des Radios Blues. The record earned a bronze medal at the 2021 Global Music Awards in the instrumental category, and Blues Music Magazine (USA) listed it among the top ten albums of the year. In Croatia, it ranked third on Mladen Lončar's list of the top 50 blues albums of the year.

His thirteenth album, Tatine priče i pjesme (transl. Daddy's Stories and Songs, 2021), was intended for children and parents, featuring six songs and five educational-entertainment stories. It won the Porin Award for Best Children's Album.

The fourteenth studio album, 20 Years on the Road (2022), recorded with guest vocalists from the United States and the United Kingdom, earned Goluban a double nomination at the American 9th Josie Music Awards (2023) as well as a nomination for the 30th Porin in the Best Rock Album category. The album achieved significant radio success on both sides of the Atlantic and appeared on Roots Music Report’s annual best blues albums chart for two consecutive years, ranking 123rd on the Top 200 Blues Album Chart and 66th on the Top 200 Contemporary Blues Album Chart in 2022, and 102nd and 55th, respectively, in 2023.

In 2023, Goluban released two live albums – Crazy Hill Live and Koncert Med bregi – followed in 2024 by his fifteenth studio album, Folkaj.

His sixteenth studio album, Nashville Road (2025), was recorded in Nashville in collaboration with American blues musician Crooked Eye Tommy. The record features nine original tracks combining Goluban's distinctive harmonica and vocals with Tommy's characteristic guitar style and lyrical expression, creating a unique transatlantic fusion of blues. The album was nominated for the 11th Josie Music Awards and the 2025 Blues Blast Music Awards. It achieved notable radio success worldwide, reaching third and fourth place on the Living Blues Radio Chart in January and February 2025, topping the Roots Music Report as Best Blues Rock Album for four consecutive weeks (11 January – 2 February 2025), ranking third on the UK's IBBA chart (January 2025), and fourth on the Australian Blues & Roots Airplay Chart. Critics hailed the album as a work transcending both genre and geography. Blues Beats described it as "a testament to the power of musical collaboration across continents and cultures," highlighting its "raw harmonica solos, soaring guitar lines, and thoughtful lyrics," recommending it as essential listening for blues enthusiasts. Blues Blast Magazine emphasized it as "a well-executed album of creative original songs, worthy of attention from start to finish."

The seventeenth studio album, Naj 20 (2025), was recorded in February 2022 at Sunday Studios. The release comprises twenty tracks that represent a "best of" selection of Croatian-language versions of songs and instrumental pieces that Goluban had previously recorded in various musical lineups. The lead single, "Ljepa roža" (transl. Beautiful Rose), was adapted from Goluban's composition "Disappear for Good". The Kajkavian dialect lyrics were written and performed by Croatian actor, director, and writer Adam Končić, who also included the song in the theatrical production "Kaj je ljubav" (transl. What Is Love) at the Komedija Theatre.

=== Zabranjeno pušenje (2022–present) ===
Goluban joined the rock band Zabranjeno pušenje in mid-2022, having previously made a guest appearance on their twelfth studio album Karamba! (2022). In 2025, he performed on the band's two live albums, Pušenje ubija and Uživo u Lisinskom.

== Community service ==
Goluban participates in the educational program Ruksak (pun) kulture (transl. A Backpack Full of Culture), implemented by the Ministry of Culture and Media of Croatia with the aim of bringing art closer to children in smaller communities. Within his original and interactive program Harmonica and the Roots of Contemporary Music, he presents to elementary school students across Croatia, in an engaging and educational manner, the historical development of blues music, the origins and characteristics of the harmonica, and its influence on modern music.

On Croatian Radio, he is the author and host of programs dedicated to blues music, most notably Tračnicama bluesa (transl. On the Tracks of Blues) and, earlier, Vrijeme za glazbu (transl. Time for Music). In 2014, he launched and has since continuously organized the Zagorje Blues Ethno Festival, a series of music-educational events held throughout Krapina-Zagorje County. The festival blends blues with ethno elements and promotes both local and national musical traditions.

Goluban is also one of the founders of the Croatian Blues Forces (HBS), the national blues society, and served as its first president from 2010 to 2012.

== Discography ==
Solo albums

- 200$ SUN Memphis Album (2010)
- Blow Junkie (2014)
- Kaj Blues Etno (2016)
- Chicago Rambler (2019)
- Memphis Light (2020)
- Express Connection (2021)
- Tatine priče i pjesme (2021)
- 20 Years on the Road (2022)
- Koncert Med bregi (2023) – live album
- Crazy Hill Live (2023) – live album
- Folkaj (2024)
- Naj 20 (2025)

Tomislav Goluban & Little Pigeon's Forhill Blues

- Pigeon's Flight (2005)
- Mr. B. (2007)
- Zagorje Blues (2009)
- Med bregi (2012)

Collaborative albums

- For a Friend & Brother (2015) – feat. Nebojša Buhin
- Velvet Space Love (2018) – feat. Toni Starešinić
- Nashville Road (2025) – feat. Crooked Eye Tommy

Zabranjeno Pušenje

- Karamba! (2022) – Guest appearance
- Pušenje ubija (2025)
- Uživo u Lisinskom (2025)
