= Anđela Zebec =

Croatian singer

- Also known as: Angie
- Born: Zagreb, SR Croatia
- Genres: rock; R&B
- Occupation: Musician
- Instruments: Vocals; percussion
- Member of: Zabranjeno Pušenje; Yurina

Anđela Zebec is a Croatian singer. She is a backing vocalist for the rock band Zabranjeno Pušenje and also performs with her own band, Yurina.

== Life and career ==
Zebec was born and raised in Zagreb, SR Croatia, Yugoslavia (nowadays in Croatia). She began her musical involvement in the fourth grade of elementary school, when she joined the girls' choir Zvjezdice.

Over the course of her career she was a founder and member of the groups Chante, Dusted Crutch, and Egoclinique. With her band Yurina, she released the single "Bliss" in the autumn of 2023.

Since 2019 Zebec has been a member of the rock band Zabranjeno Pušenje. She contributed to their most recent studio album Karamba! (2022), as well as to their two latest live albums, Pušenje ubija (2025) and Uživo u Lisinskom (2025). She also appeared in the music video for the song "Ekrem" from the album Karamba!.

== Discography ==
Zabranjeno pušenje

- Karamba! (2022.)
- Pušenje ubija (2025.)
- Uživo u Lisinskom (2025.)
