= Casa Loma Ballroom =

Coordinates: 38°35′38″N 90°13′43″W

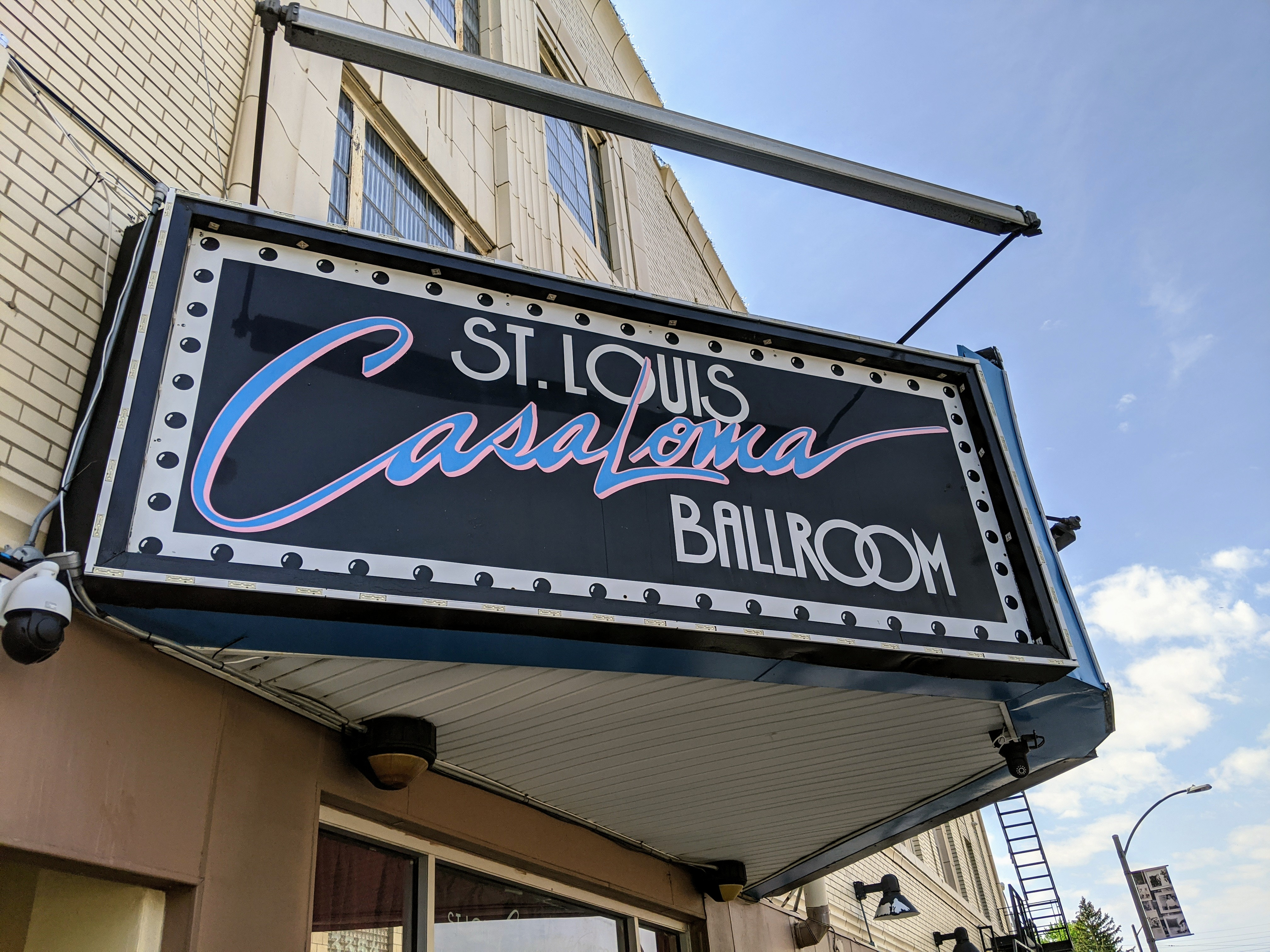
- Interactive map of the Casa Loma Ballroom area
- Former names: Cinderella Recreation Hall and Dance Academy; Showboat Ballroom

General information
- Location: 3354 Iowa Avenue; St. Louis, Missouri, U.S.
- Opened: 1927

Technical details
- Floor area: 18,000 ft

Other information
- Public transit: MetroBus

Website
- www.casalomaballroom.com

Casa Loma Ballroom is a historic dance hall in St. Louis, Missouri. It is located at 3354 Iowa Avenue in the city's Gravois Park neighborhood.

== History ==
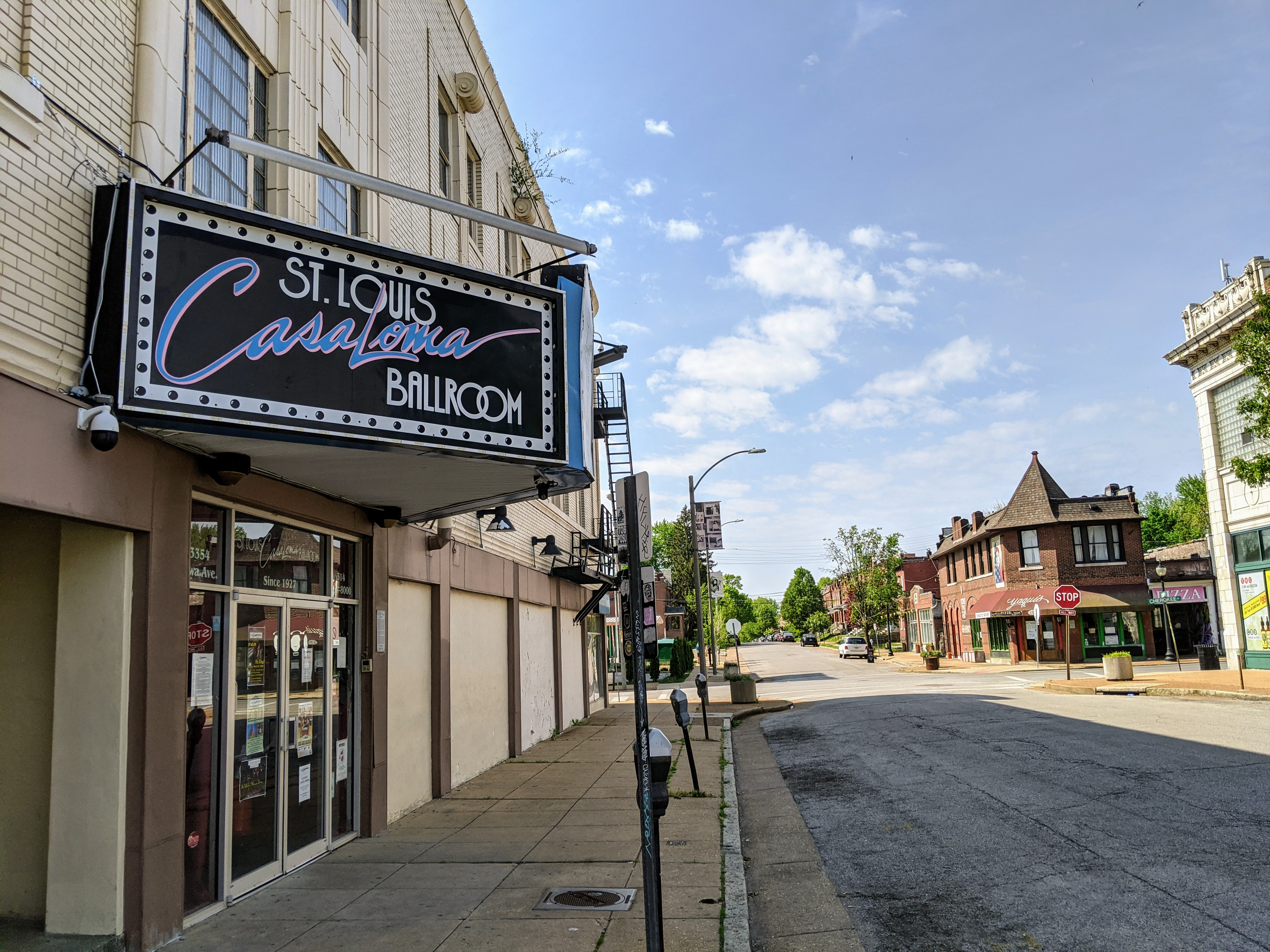
Casa Loma Ballroom exterior in 2020

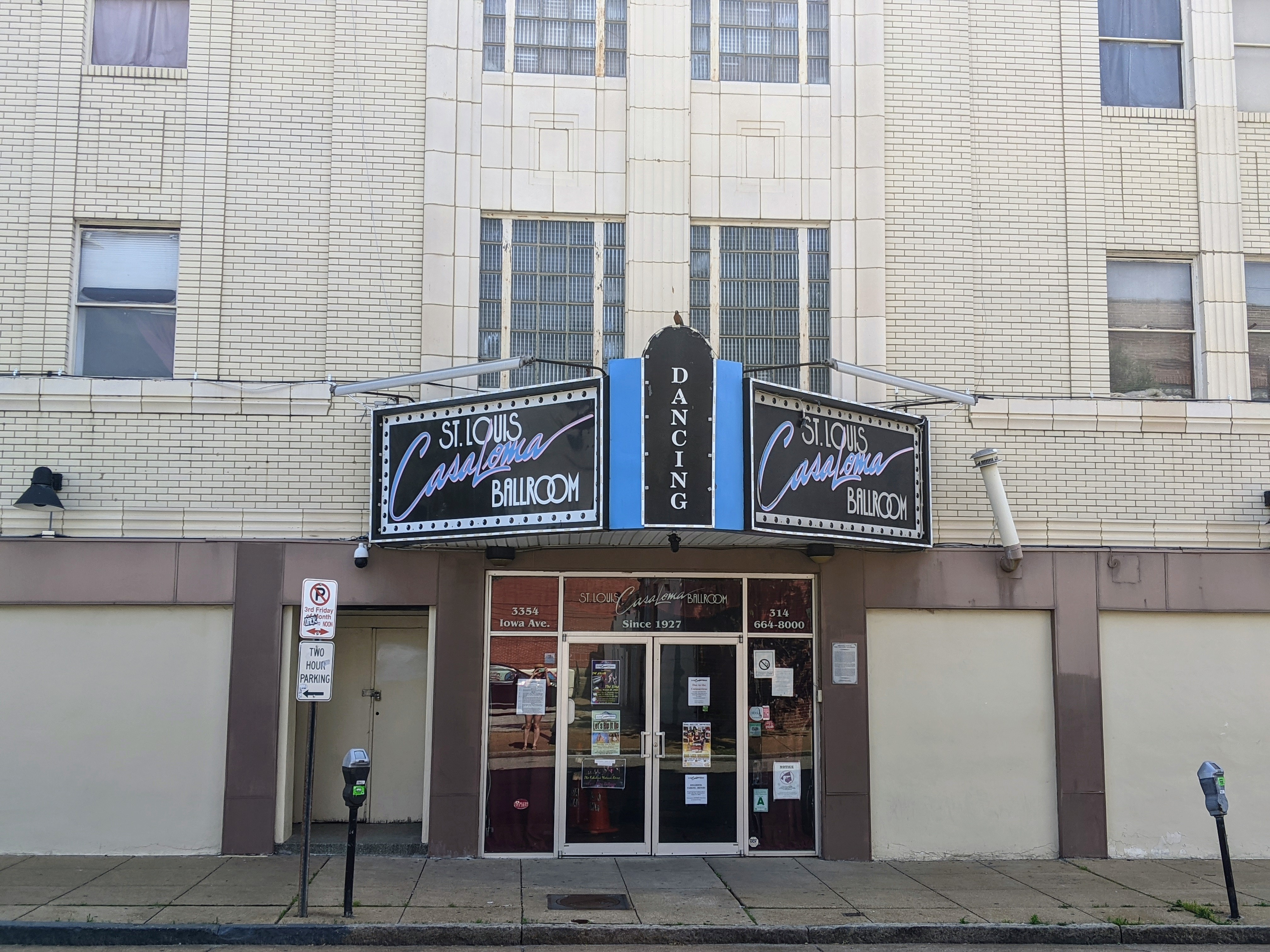
Casa Loma Ballroom in 2020

The Cinderella Recreation Hall and Dance Academy was built in 1927 and later renamed the Showboat Ballroom. When Art Kawell and H. J. "Nap" Burian purchased it in 1935, it was again renamed; its new name, Casa Loma Ballroom, has remained.

As its prices were lower than those of the other dance halls in St. Louis, it was known as a "working-class" ballroom.

Mutual and CBS big band remotes were broadcast to a national audience from Casa Loma in the 1940s. Bandleaders who played Casa Loma include Louis Armstrong, Count Basie, Jimmy Dorsey, Tommy Dorsey, Benny Goodman, Harry James (with Frank Sinatra in 1939), Herbie Kay, Stan Kenton, Glenn Miller, Freddy Nagel, Artie Shaw, Lawrence Welk, and Frankie Yankovic. Other performers who stopped at Casa Loma are Steve Allen, Tony Bennett, Bill Haley and the Comets, Bing Crosby, Rita Hayworth, Jerry Lee Lewis, Mickey Rooney, Tom and Dick Smothers, and Andy Williams.

Casa Loma burned on the evening of January 19, 1940. It reopened later that year with a major improvement: a 5,000 square foot "floating" dance floor consisting of maple on top of an inch of rubber. It has 18,000 square feet and a balcony that overlooks the dance floor.

The ballroom, long the only one remaining in St. Louis, has been owned by Patrick and Roseann Brannon since the early 1990s. It hosts performances of swing, big band, jazz, and rock and roll music. Lessons in ballroom, waltz, fox trot, tango, Latin and swing dancing often take place before the live music begins. It also serves as a private and public events venue.

== In popular culture ==
The bandstand television program St. Louis Hop, hosted by Russ Carter, was filmed at Casa Loma Ballroom for part of its run.

Writer Elaine Viets used Casa Loma as a setting in the novel Rubout in her Francesca Vierline mystery series.

On July 29, 1988, a 38-year-old woman suffered a severe heart attack at the Ballroom. She was defibrillated on scene three times by EMS and taken to the hospital where she recovered. This incident was reenacted on the television program Rescue 911.
