= Hodi da ti čiko nešto da =

Studio album by Zabranjeno Pušenje
- Released: November 16, 2006
- Recorded: November 2004 – June 2006
- Studio: Present Studio, Zagreb, Croatia
- Genre: Garage rock; new primitivism
- Length: 78:54
- Language: Bosnian
- Label: Civitas; Mascom Records
- Producer: Sejo Sexon; Denyken

Zabranjeno Pušenje chronology
Live in St. Louis (2004)	Hodi da ti čiko nešto da (2006)	The Ultimate Collection (2009)

Singles from Hodi da ti čiko nešto da
- 1. "Nema više" Released: June 26, 2006; 2. "Dobro dvorište" Released: November 4, 2006; 3. "Džana" Released: February 21, 2008

Hodi da ti čiko nešto da (transl. Come and Get It from the Nice Man) is the eighth studio album by Bosnian rock band Zabranjeno Pušenje, released through Civitas in Bosnia and Herzegovina on November 16, 2006, and Croatia on March 15, 2007 and through Mascom Records in Serbia in 2007. Moreover, Hodi da ti čiko nešto da is the second double-full-length studio album released by the band. The double-album subtitles are Se kličem Mujo and Se kličem Suljo.

== Track listing ==
Source: Discogs

Se kličem Mujo
No.	Title	Writer(s)	Arranger(s)	Length
1.	"Nema više" (No More)	Davor Sučić; Nenad Veličković		4:06
2.	"Mali Motač Jointa" (Lil' Joint Roller)	Sučić; John Fogerty		3:45
3.	"Pravo zajebani DJ iz Chicaga" (Real Badass DJ from Chicago)	Sučić		4:17
4.	"Biffe Neretva"	Sučić		5:15
5.	"Dobro dvorište" (My good 'hood)	Sučić	Sučić; Robert Boldižar	4:51
6.	"Sigurna vremena" (Safe Times)	Sučić		4:14
7.	"Haag" (The Hague)	Sučić	Sučić	3:09
8.	"Impossible is Nothing (David Beckham)"	Sučić; Dragomir Herendić		3:00
9.	"Laku noć stari" (Good night, old man)	Sučić		5:08
10.	"Takvim sjajem" (Shine So Bright)	Arsen Dedić		5:07
Total length:				43:26

Se kličem Suljo
No.	Title	Writer(s)	Arranger(s)	Length
1.	"Hodi da ti čiko nešto da" (Come and Get It from the Nice Man)	Sučić	Paul Kempf	1:30
2.	"Džana" (Janna)	Darko Ostojić		4:13
3.	"Pred zatvorenim šankom" (Outside a Closed Bar)	Sučić		3:45
4.	"OK Diane"	Sučić		4:02
5.	"Mejtaš"	Ostojić		3:45
6.	"Igrač s brojem 2" (Player Wearing #2)	Sučić		4:54
7.	"Džeki" (Jackie)	Sučić		3:26
8.	"Agregat" (Generator)	Sučić		4:12
9.	"Domovina" (Homeland)	Sučić; Veličković; Šaban Gadžo		5:41
Total length:				35:28

Notes

- "Pravo zajebani DJ iz Chicaga" contains voice sample of George W. Bush, the 43rd President of the United States
- "Biffe Neretva" contains voice sample of actress Lucija Šerbedžija, speaking in Ukrainian

== Personnel ==
Credits adapted from the album's liner notes.

Zabranjeno Pušenje

- Sejo Sexon – lead vocals, guitar
- Robert Boldižar – violin, keyboards, backing vocals
- Branko Trajkov Trak – drums, percussion, backing vocals
- Predrag Bobić Bleka – bass
- Toni Lović – electric guitar, acoustic guitar
- Paul Kempf – keyboards

Production

- Sejo Sexon – production
- Denis Mujadžić Denyken – music production, recording, mastering
- Dario Vitez – executive production

Design

- Tarik Zahirović – design and layout (Ideologija Creative Agency in Sarajevo, BIH)
- Saša Midžor Sučić – photos
- Denis Lovrović – photos

Additional musicians

- Arsen Dedić – conductor (track 1-10)
- Bruno Urlić – violin (tracks 1-06, 1-10)
- Sakin Modronja – vocals (track 1-09)
- Irena Mujadžić – backing vocals
- Jelena Vučetić – backing vocals
- Nina Sučić – viola (track 1-10)
- Stanislav Kovačić – cello (track 1-10)
- Marijan Jakić – saxophone (Brass section)
- Antonio Janković – trombone (Brass section)
- Tomica Rukljić – trumpet (Brass section)
- Krešimir Oreški – djembe
- Ismet Kurtović – vocal choir contractor, choir
- Aida Kočo – choir
- Aldijana Mujić – choir
- Alma Srebreniković – choir
- Amina Omanović – choir
- Azra Grabčanović – choir
- Belma Hadžović – choir
- Boris Turina – choir
- Dženana Čaušević – choir
- Emina Nuhbegović – choir
- Galija Hammad – choir
- Melisa Huskić – choir
- Nimer Hammad – choir
- Sakin Modronja – choir
- Selma Srebreniković – choir

== Awards and nominations ==
Year	Nominated work	Category	Award	Result	Notes	Ref.
2007	Hodi da ti čiko nešto da	Rock Album of the Year	Davorin	Nominated		
2007	"Dobro dvorište"	Rock Song of the Year	Davorin	Nominated		
2007	"Dobro dvorište"	Rock Music Video of the Year	Davorin	Nominated		
2007	"Nema više"	Rock Song of the Year	Davorin	Nominated		
2007	"Nema više"	Rock Music Video of the Year	Davorin	Nominated		
2007	Zabranjeno pušenje	Rock Performer of the Year	Davorin	Won		
2007	Sejo Sexon	Best Male Singer	Davorin	Nominated		
2007	Zabranjeno pušenje & Arsen Dedić	Collaboration of the Year	Davorin	Nominated		
