= Anur Hadžiomerspahić =

- Born: 2 June 1971; Sarajevo, SR Bosnia and Herzegovina, SFR Yugoslavia
- Died: 29 November 2017 (aged 46); Sarajevo, Bosnia and Herzegovina
- Education: Istituto Europeo di Design Milano; Accademia di Belle Arti Brera Milano
- Notable work: Human Condition; Made in Bosnia
- Website: anurhadziomerspahic.com

Anur Hadžiomerspahić (2 June 1971 – 29 November 2017), also known as Anur, was an artist and graphic designer from Bosnia and Herzegovina. He was notable for being the first Bosnian artist to show their work in the central pavilion at the Venice Biennale.

== Early life and education ==
Anur was born in Sarajevo, SR Bosnia and Herzegovina, SFR Yugoslavia. He studied graphic design at the Academy of Fine Arts in Sarajevo and graduated from the Accademia di Belle Arti Brera and Istituto Europeo di Design in Milan.

== Career ==
In the months immediately preceding the siege of Sarajevo, Anur co-founded (together with Juriša Boras, Almir Kurt, Damir Nikšić and Nebojša Šerić Shoba) the rhythm and blues band Sing Sing. The band grew into a multidisciplinary art collective, bringing together elements of musical theatre, political activism and ironic humour.

In 1993, Anur founded the Ars Aevi project with his father Enver Hadžiomerspahić, where he acted as its co-founder and subsequent art director. He participated in forming the collection for the Ars Aevi Museum of Contemporary Art in Sarajevo and organization of exhibitions by Michelangelo Pistoletto, Jannis Kounellis, Daniel Buren, Joseph Kosuth.

As a student at the Accademia di Belle Arti Brera and Istituto Europeo di Design in Milan, Anur began producing a series of posters entitled Human Condition: Public Shouting and Individual Revolutions. Human Condition is characteristic of his chosen mode of artistic expression that he calls Artvertising: he uses the medium of advertising to send socially relevant messages. The posters have been exhibited in public spaces, shopping centres and supermarkets across Bosnia and Herzegovina and Italy since 1996. In 2001, Harald Szeemann included Anur's Human Condition project in the central exhibition of the 49th Venice Biennale.

In 1998, Anur initiated the Made in Bosnia project. The project aims to represent and promote Bosnian-Herzegovinian culture through the language of graphic design and advertising campaigns.

In 2000, Anur founded the Cardea Creative Centre. For his work with Cardea, he was a finalist for the Epica Award in 1998 and 2000, and winner of the Epica Award in 2001. In 2002, Cardea was renamed Ideologija. Ideologija has worked with large Bosnian-Herzegovinian business companies and has been present on the Bosnian-Herzegovinian cultural scene with campaigns for Ars Aevi, Jazz Fest Sarajevo, SARTR, Letu štuke, Zabranjeno Pušenje, Dino Merlin, Edo Maajka, and Amira Medunjanin.

== Prizes and awards ==
Anur has received numerous awards for design and advertising, including Advertainment in Milan (2000) and the Epica Award in Paris (2001).
