= Bosnian root music =

Music genre

Bosnian root music (izvorna bosanska muzika/изворна босанска музика) is a polyphonic type of singing. It is the most popular form of rural music in Bosnia and Herzegovina. The singers are usually accompanied by violin, dvojnice and šargija. The genre is connected to ganga and ravne pjesme, which are also characteristic of Bosnia and Herzegovina. The origin of the music is unknown, but certain characteristics, like different temperament from the standard music, suggests it is an old type of music.

== Songs ==
The songs have many subjects, from being a "lola" and "baraba", about love of a woman, having a good life, but also about sad things like the war in Bosnia, or the nostalgia that expatriates feel for their home country. More recently Bosnian root music has concentrated on some facets of the modern way of life, such as the widespread use of Facebook and smartphones.

== Style ==
Bosnian root music is a polyphonic, or more commonly heterophonic music, which is usually sung by two singers. The first singer starts the song, and after some number of syllables the other joins in. Intervals used in this type of singing are minor and major second, which is characteristic for most of the Bosnian and Herzegovinian music, and some parts of Croatia. Range of the songs is usually narrow, consisting of only few tones. The two singers differ in the use of ornaments, so usually the first one who started the song uses vibrato and trill while he is singing alone, and when the other joins in he uses no ornaments, while the other uses much trill, which are produced from the throat giving the overall performance its characteristic detuned nature.

== Examples ==
Examples of Bosnian root music bands include Sateliti, Zvuci Podrinja, and Raspjevane Meraklije.

== See also ==
- Balkan music
