= Robert Boldižar =

Bosnian and Croatian violinist and music pedagogue

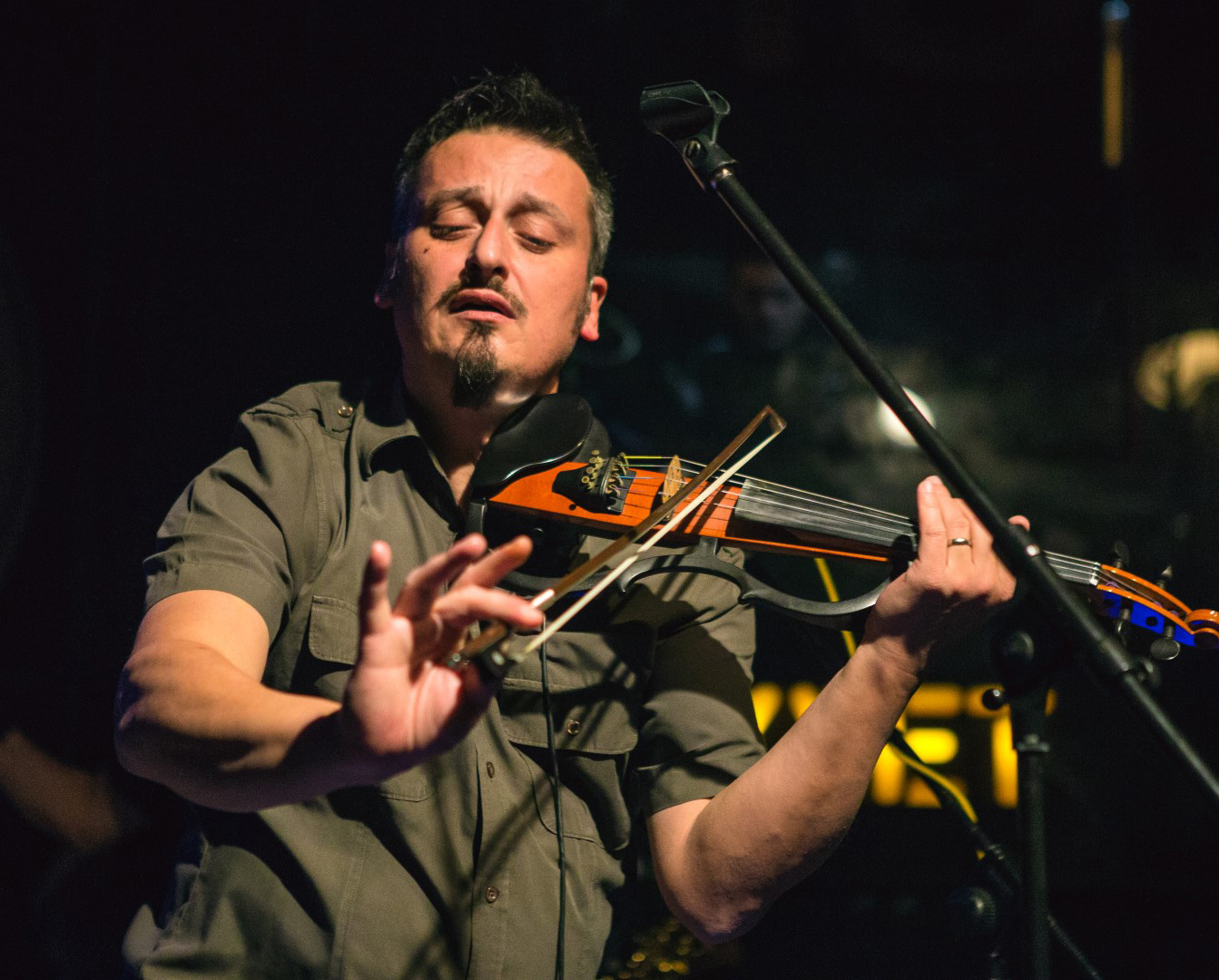
- Robert Boldižar in 2017

Background information
- Born: 9 June 1974 (age 52); Osijek, SR Croatia, Yugoslavia
- Origin: Sarajevo, Bosnia and Herzegovina
- Genres: Classical; rock; traditional folk
- Occupations: Musician; music teacher
- Instruments: violin; keyboards; guitar; comb
- Years active: 1988–present

Robert Boldižar (born 9 June 1974) is a Bosnian-Croatian violinist and music pedagogue. He is a current member of rock band Zabranjeno Pušenje.

== Life and career ==
Boldižar was born in Osijek, SFR Yugoslavia (nowadays Croatia). Before his first birthday his family moved to Sarajevo (nowadays Bosnia and Herzegovina) where he was raised. His father is a musician. At the age of six (1980), he enrolled in a music school and began to play the violin. In 1988, he enrolled in a Musical High School and began to play the guitar. In that time he had joined in the Cultural-Artistic Group (KUD) 'Unis' and get familiar with a traditional folk music. In 1992, he joined Vocal and instrumental band (VIS) 'Pax' which performed a religious music. At the time, he occasionally worked for the Sarajevo Philharmonic Orchestra.

In 1995, Boldižar moved to Zagreb, Croatia. In 2000, he formed a band named Generalna proba (transl. The General Rehearsal). The band released one album, Iznad Oblaka (2002). Boldižar earned his degree from the Academy of Music, University of Zagreb in 2005. In 2008, Boldižar composed the music for the Pahuljice Children's Choir album Školska priča (transl. A School Story).

Alongside with the Zabranjeno pušenje member Toni Lović, Boldižar is a member of the Medley Theater band. The theater performs adapted rock musical Antigona: ProckKletstvo Roda based on the Greek myth of Antigone, among others.

In 2013, Boldižar moved to Bjelovar where he works as a music professor at the Vatroslav Lisinski Music School. He holds the violin classes.

=== Zabranjeno pušenje (2004–present) ===
Since 2004, Boldižar has been a member of the rock band Zabranjeno Pušenje. He performed on their last five studio albums; Hodi da ti čiko nešto da (2006), Muzej revolucije (2009), Radovi na cesti (2013), Šok i nevjerica (2018), and Karamba! (2022). Additionally, he was a guest performer on their concerts in Zagreb and Sarajevo when recordings for the live album Hapsi sve! (1998) happened. In 2025, he performed on the band's two live albums, Pušenje ubija and Uživo u Lisinskom.

== Discography ==
Zabranjeno pušenje

- Hapsi sve! (1998) – Guest appearance
- Hodi da ti čiko nešto da (2006)
- Muzej revolucije (2009)
- Radovi na cesti (2013)
- Šok i nevjerica (2018)
- Live in Skenderija Sarajevo 2018 (2022)
- Karamba! (2022)
- Pušenje ubija (2025)
- Uživo u Lisinskom (2025)

Shaderwan Code

- Kad procvatu behari (2011)
- Ah, što ćemo ljubav kriti (2018) – Guest appearance
