= Radovi na cesti =

Studio album by Zabranjeno Pušenje
- Released: October 10, 2013
- Recorded: 2012
- Studio: Plavi Film, Zagreb, Croatia
- Genre: Rock
- Length: 45:00
- Language: Bosnian
- Label: Tropik; Croatia Records; Dallas Records
- Producer: Sejo Sexon; Toni Lović

Zabranjeno Pušenje chronology
Muzej revolucije (2009)	Radovi na cesti (2013)	Šok i nevjerica (2018)

Singles from Radovi na cesti
- 1. "Boško i Admira" Released: April 6, 2013; 2. "Ti voliš sapunice" Released: October 2, 2013; 3. "Tri kile, tri godine" Released: May 27, 2015; 4. "U Tvoje ime" Released: February 2, 2016; 5. "Klasa optimist" Released: June 20, 2016; 6. "Kafana kod Keke" Released: January 26, 2017

Radovi na cesti (transl. Road Work) is the tenth studio album by Bosnian rock band Zabranjeno Pušenje, released through Tropik distribution in Bosnia and Herzegovina, Croatia Records in Croatia and Dallas Records in Serbia, on October 10, 2013. Also, the album has been available on free digital download since its release.

== Promotion ==
A music video for "Boško i Admira" was filmed with Žare Batinović as the director and the writer and was released on their YouTube channel on April 6, 2013.

On October 2, 2013, the band released the second single called "Ti voliš sapunice" on their YouTube channel. The video is directed by Žare Batinović was filmed in Sarajevo from August 31, to September 1, 2013. Sejo Sexon is cast as a lead male role, while Nikolina Jelisavac is a lead female role.

On May 27, 2015, they released video for the song "Tri kile, tri godine" on their YouTube channel. On Jun 20, 2016, the band published the fifth video of the album on their YouTube channel. It is for the song "Klasa optimist". The video for the song "Kafana kod Keke" is published on January 26, 2017.

== Critical reception ==
Professional ratings
Review scores
Source	Rating
balkanrock.com	3.5/5 stars

Radovi na cesti has received favourable reviews from critics. Petar Kostić of the balkanrock.com gave the album a positive review stating that "the product of talent, prowess and uncompromising must be quality".

== Track listing ==
Source: Discogs

No.	Title	Writer(s)	Arranger(s)	Length
1.	"U Tvoje ime" (In Your Name)	Davor Sučić	Sučić; Antun Lović	2:51
2.	"Tri kile, tri godine" (Three K's, Three Years)	Sučić; Lović	Sučić; Lović	4:01
3.	"Ti voliš sapunice" (You Like Soap Operas)	Sučić; Lović		3:16
4.	"Kafana kod Keke" (Keka's Place)	Sučić; Lović	Sučić; Lović	3:53
5.	"Boško i Admira" (Boško and Admira)	Sučić; Lović; Mario Vestić	Sučić; Lović; Vestić	5:34
6.	"Reci da svemu" (Say Yes to Everything)	Sučić; Lović	Sučić; Lović	4:27
7.	"Mafija" (Mafia)	Sučić	Sučić; Lović	3:27
8.	"Lav" (A Lion)	Sučić; Lović		4:35
9.	"Egzotične ljepotice istoka (ili Kako je počela Revolucija u kasabi Donji Mejdan)" (Exotic Beauties of the East (or How the Revolution Started in the Town of Donji Mejdan))	Sučić; Lović	Lović; Branko Trajkov	4:39
10.	"Klasa Optimist" (The Optimist Class)	Sučić; Lović; Trajkov		3:51
Total length:				40:35

Bonus track
No.	Title	Writer(s)	Arranger(s)	Length
11.	"Neprijatelj" (The Enemy)	Sučić; Lović	Lović	4:26
Total length:				45:00

== Personnel ==
Credits adapted from the album's liner notes.

Zabranjeno Pušenje

- Sejo Sexon – lead vocals, guitar, backing vocals
- Toni Lović – electric guitar, acoustic guitar
- Branko Trajkov Trak – drums, percussion, acoustic guitar, backing vocals
- Robert Boldižar – violin, keyboards, backing vocals
- Paul Kempf – keyboards
- Dejan Orešković Klo – bass

Additional musicians

- Ante Prgin Surka – backing vocals (track 2), trumpet (tracks 2, 3)
- Romeo Krželj Roki – backing vocals (track 5)
- Nenad Borić – drums

Production

- Sejo Sexon – production
- Toni Lović – sound engineering, programing, audio mixing, production (Studio Plavi Film in Zagreb, Croatia)
- John Davis – mastering (Metropolis Mastering in London, UK)
- Dario Vitez – executive production

Design

- Anur Hadžiomerspahić – design and layout (Ideologija Creative Agency in Sarajevo, BIH)
- Saša Midžor Sučić – photos
