= Tour manager =

Organizer of the scheduling of appearances of a musical group

A tour manager (or concert tour manager) is the person who helps to organize the administration for a schedule of appearances of a musical group (band) or artist at a sequence of venues (a concert tour). In general, road managers handle tour details for their specific band, while tour managers are used to oversee the logistics, finances and communications for tours as a holistic entity. So, on any given tour, there may be road managers taking care of each band as well as a Tour Manager responsible for caring for the entire tour. The Tour Manager may also be the headlining band's road manager.

The performances on a concert tour are booked by the act’s booking agent, who works with concert promoters to place the act in suitable venues and festivals in a time frame and territory agreed with the act’s management. Individual concert promoters negotiate the financial, technical and hospitality requirements of the artist and make an offer to the booking agent for the show. The tour is announced and tickets put on sale when agreement is reached on the tour dates. As modern concert touring involves complex financial, legal and technical arrangements, the booking agent or artist manager hire a tour manager to organize the logistics, personnel, communications and schedule. Concert tour managers are usually freelancers working on a tour-by-tour basis.

== Duties ==
The tour manager is given the itinerary for the tour by the booking agent or Artist Manager. Working from this itinerary, the tour manager handles the following activities.

=== Financial ===
The itinerary includes information about the potential ticket income (fees) for each show. Using this information the tour manager can produce a budget for the tour, calculating costs for crew wages, per diems, accommodation, transport, sound, lighting and video equipment, visas and work permits, rehearsals and other expenses such as booking agent commissions.

=== Advancing ===
Advancing is the process of contacting each promoter and venue to ensure the entire artist's technical and hospitality demands (the rider) are met and to resolve any problems the promoter or venue can foresee. The artist's rider covers catering, production (sound, lights, stagehands needed), security, general show, and legal issues. During the advancing process the tour manager checks contact names and addresses, arrival times, equipment load-in times, sound check and performance times, any supporting/opening acts, and live music curfews. This information is collated into a "tour book" which is issued to the band and crew.

=== On the road ===
The tour manager travels with the band on the tour. The job on the road varies depending on the type and success level of the act. A tour manager's day-to-day workload can include:

- Overseeing hotel departures
- Settling accommodation bills
- Overseeing travel arrangements; i.e. band and crew onto the bus or to the airport
- Paying per diems to the band/artist and crew
- Overseeing venue arrival - double-checking hospitality and technical arrangements
- Arranging up-to-date running order with venue and promoter
- Overseeing promotional activities; i.e. TV, radio and press interviews at the venue or at other locations
- Supervising setup operations
- Supervising any support or opening acts
- Ensuring venue is ready to open on time by supervising sound check times
- Liaising with transport department regarding the next days' travel
- Ensuring all acts perform on time and for the allotted time
- Settling performance fee with promoter and collecting any cash due
- Ensuring all touring equipment is re-packed and loaded back onto tour transport
- Preparing band and crew schedule sheets for the next day
- Overseeing band and crew on to appropriate overnight transport or to next hotel
- Reporting this show's attendance figures to management and booking agent
- Troubleshooting unforeseen issues and emergencies that occur
- Ordering after show food for the band and crew
- Preparing an accurate tour budget for the manager and business manager to approve
- Doing daily tour accounting if there is no tour accountant
- Preparing the tour book (itinerary) which contains information such as venue details, hotel details, promoter details, show schedule and daily travel details
- Hiring the road crew (roadies)
- Supervises the creation of tour backstage passes
- Coordinates gear rental (sound, lights, backline) with production manager
- Coordinates any visas and work permits needed for touring entourage
- Deals with foreign artist tax deductions (when applicable) with business manager and promoter
- Updates artist contract rider when necessary
- Coordinates air, sea and land cargo when necessary
- Coordinates ordering of tour supplies (guitar strings, drum sticks, batteries, etc.) when needed
- Coordinates creation of scenic shows such as backdrops and scrims when needed
- Prepares carnets for equipment with shipping companies when necessary
- Supervises creation of stage plots and input charts with stage crew when necessary and adds them to rider
- Completes daily guest list for band and crew
- Supports merchandiser when needed
