= Toni Lović =

Croatian guitarist and record producer

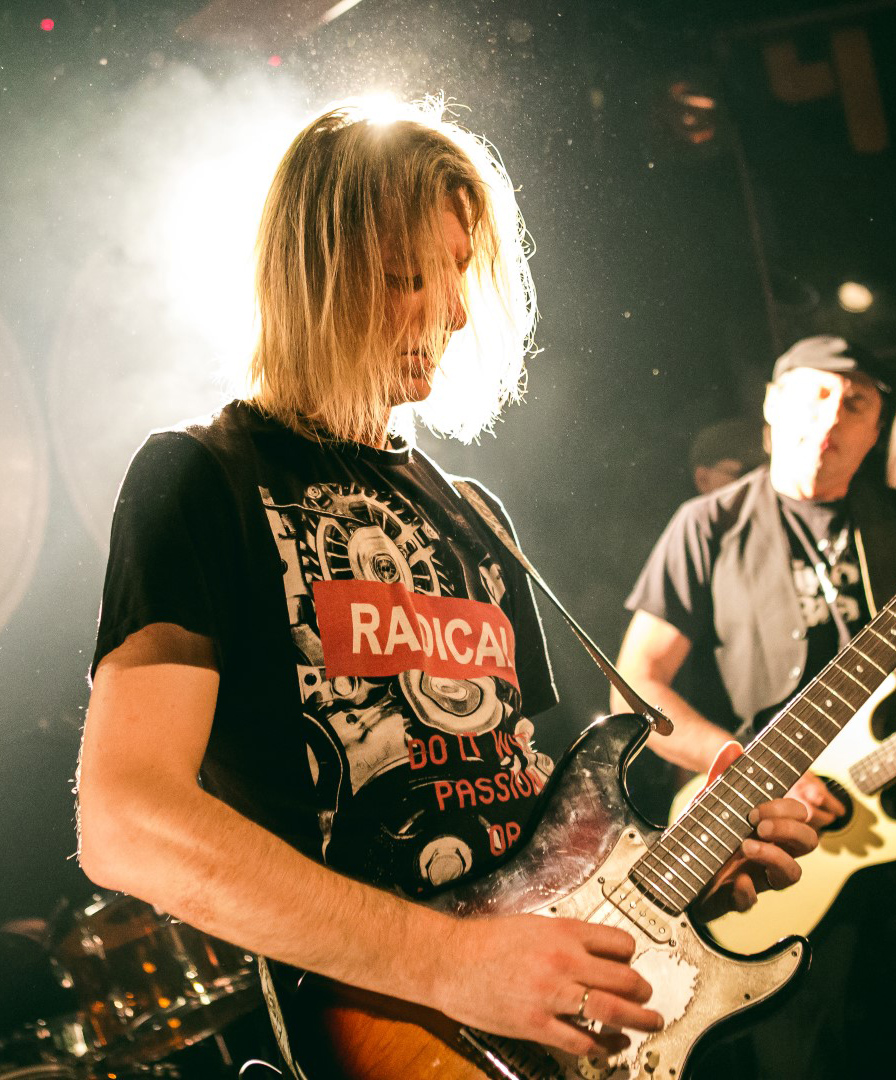
- Toni Lović in 2017

Background information
- Also known as: Toni, Tony
- Born: Antun Lović; July 2, 1967 (age 58); Slavonski Brod, SR Croatia, Yugoslavia
- Genres: Heavy metal; rock; pop rock
- Occupations: Musician; producer
- Instruments: electric guitar; acoustic guitar
- Years active: 1986–present
- Label: Croatia Records
- Member of: Zabranjeno Pušenje; Shaderwan Code

Antun "Toni" Lović (born July 2, 1967) is a Croatian guitarist and record producer. He is a current member of rock band Zabranjeno Pušenje.

== Life and career ==
Lović was born and raised in Slavonski Brod, SFR Yugoslavia (nowadays Croatia). At the beginning of the 1980s, he began to deal with music and soon became one of the best local guitarists. In 1988, he co-founded the heavy metal band Sauron. In 1992, Lović and his band Sauron released their first studio album Better Tomorrow. Later, he moved to Zagreb and joined then-famous Croatian heavy metal band Hard Time. With them he released two albums: Kad poludim in 1996, and No.3 ten years later. At the same time, he works as a record producer and a sound engineer in the studio of Alen Islamović. Also, he recorded two studio albums with band Buđenje; Lipo vrime (2002) and Kosti i tilo (2005).

Lović works as a record producer at the Plavi Film Studio in Zagreb. Also, works as a studio musician.

=== Zabranjeno pušenje (2004–present) ===
Since 2004, Lović has been a member of the rock band Zabranjeno Pušenje. He performed on their last five studio albums, Hodi da ti čiko nešto da (2006), Muzej revolucije (2009), Radovi na cesti (2013), and Šok i nevjerica (2018), and Karamba! (2022). In 2025, he performed on the band's two live albums, Pušenje ubija and Uživo u Lisinskom.

== Discography ==
Zabranjeno pušenje

- Hodi da ti čiko nešto da (2006)
- Muzej revolucije (2009)
- Radovi na cesti (2013)
- Šok i nevjerica (2018)
- Live in Skenderija Sarajevo 2018 (2022)
- Karamba! (2022)
- Pušenje ubija (2025)
- Uživo u Lisinskom (2025)
