= Nenad Veličković =

Bosnian writer and playwright (born 1962)

Nenad Veličković (Serbo-Croatian Cyrillic: Ненад Величковић; born 1962) is a Bosnian writer and playwright. He lives in Sarajevo.

== Recent activity ==
In 2017, Nenad Veličković has signed the Declaration on the Common Language of the Croats, Serbs, Bosniaks and Montenegrins.
