= Zabranjeno Pušenje videography =

Zabranjeno Pušenje video discography
- Music videos: 46
- Films: 1

A complete list of known films about a rock band Zabranjeno Pušenje and a list of released music videos by the band.

== Filmography ==
Title	Year	Language	Director	Notes	Ref.
No Smoking in Sarajevo	2016	Italian	Gianluca Loffredo	Documentary	

== Music videos ==
Title	Year	Originating album	Director(s)	Screenwriter(s)	Other actor(s)	Description	Ref(s)
"Neću da budem Švabo u dotiranom filmu"	1984	Das ist Walter					
"Abid"		Das ist Walter					
"Anarhija all over Baščaršija"		Das ist Walter					
"Ibro dirka"	1985	Dok čekaš sabah sa šejtanom					
"Stanje šoka"		Dok čekaš sabah sa šejtanom					
"Manijak"		Pozdrav iz zemlje Safari	Emir Kusturica				
"Balada o Pišonji i Žugi"		Pozdrav iz zemlje Safari					
"Guzonjin sin"		Male priče o velikoj ljubavi					
"12 sati"		Male priče o velikoj ljubavi					
"Možeš imat' moje tijelo"		Fildžan viška	Tomislav Fiket	Sejo Sexon; Elvis J. Kurtovich			
"Mile Hašišar"		Fildžan viška	Tomislav Fiket	Sejo Sexon; Elvis J. Kurtovich			
"Pubertet"		Fildžan viška	Tomislav Fiket	Sejo Sexon; Elvis J. Kurtovich			
"Fildžan viška"		Fildžan viška	Tomislav Fiket	None	None	Live action from various concerts	
"Guzonjin sin"		Hapsi sve! (Live)	Antonio Nuić	None	None	Live action from various concerts	
"Pos'o, kuća, birtija"		Agent tajne sile	Tomislav Fiket	Sejo Sexon			
"Agent tajne sile"		Agent tajne sile	Jasna Zastavniković				
"Jugo 45"		Agent tajne sile	Goran Kulenović	Sejo Sexon			
"Pupoljak"		Agent tajne sile	Tomislav Fiket				
"Splitska princeza"		Bog vozi Mercedes	Goran Kulenović	Sejo Sexon			
"Arizona Dream"		Bog vozi Mercedes	Goran Kulenović	Sejo Sexon			
"Počasna salva"		Bog vozi Mercedes	Tomislav Fiket	Sejo Sexon			
"Lijepa Alma"		Bog vozi Mercedes	Bruno Razum				
"Karabaja"	2003	Bog vozi Mercedes	Danilo Šerbedžija	Sejo Sexon			
"Bog vozi Mercedes"	2004	Bog vozi Mercedes	Danilo Šerbedžija	Sejo Sexon			
"Posljednja oaza (Fikreta)"	2004	Live in St. Louis	None	None	None	Live action from various concerts during the 2002 U.S. Tour	
"Zenica blues"	2005	Live in St. Louis	Boris Šiber	None	None	Live action from a concert in the Zenica prison	
"Nema više"	2006	Hodi da ti čiko nešto da	Jasmin Duraković				
"Dobro dvorište"	2006	Hodi da ti čiko nešto da	Tomislav Fiket		Students of Zagreb Faculty of Philosophy		
"Džana"	2008	Hodi da ti čiko nešto da					
"Modni Guru"	2009	Muzej revolucije	Tomislav Fiket	Sejo Sexon			
"Kladimo se"	2010	Muzej revolucije	Haris Dubica		Aida Alilović, Tatjana Pašalić, Haris Burina		
"Kada Sena pleše"	2011	Muzej revolucije	Sejo Sexon		Moto Club Hollister members		
"Tvoja bosa stopala"	2011	Muzej revolucije	Zoran Marković Zonjo		Marija Karan		
"Samir-time"	2012	Muzej revolucije	Sejo Sexon		Fani Capalija, Haris Burina		
"Boško i Admira"	2013	Radovi na cesti	Žare Batinović		Ajla Hamzić, Junuz Elkaz		
"Ti voliš sapunice"	2013	Radovi na cesti	Žare Batinović	Sejo Sexon	Nikolina Jelisavac		
"Stanje šoka"	2014	No album	None	None	Darko Ostojić, Samir Ćeramida, Dado Džihan, Zenit Đozić, Mustafa Čengić	Live action from the 30th Anniversary Concert in Skenderija, Sarajevo on December 28, 2013	
"Lutka sa naslovne strane" (feat. Mile Kekin)	2014	No album	Žare Batinović	None	None	Live action from the 30th Anniversary Concert in Skenderija, Sarajevo on December 28, 2013	
"Tri kile, tri godine"	2015	Radovi na cesti	Anđelo Jurkas; Sejo Sexon	Sejo Sexon	None		
"U Tvoje ime"	2016	Radovi na cesti	Marcella Zanki	Sejo Sexon	None		
"Klasa optimist"	2016	Radovi na cesti	Jasmin Duraković; Sejo Sexon	Sejo Sexon; Dario Vitez	Zenit Đozić, Haris Burina, Mija Šego, Dajana Vrećo, Andrea Šarac		
"Kafana kod Keke"	2017	Radovi na cesti	Nikola Blagojević; Amer Beganović; Zlatan Menković		Elvis J. Kurtovich, Marin Gradac, Emir Hadžihafizbegović, Saša Petrović, Filip Šovagović, Senad Bašić, Jelena Gavrilović, Nermin Tulić, Mladen Vojičić Tifa, Futavci, Jasmin Duraković		
"Nova godina"	2017	Šok i nevjerica	Saša Peševski	Sejo Sexon	Bojana Gregorić-Vejzović; Nadine Mičić		
"Irska"	2018	Šok i nevjerica	Danilo Šerbedžija		None		
"Kupi nas Ali"	2019	Šok i nevjerica			Halid Bešlić		

== See also ==
- Zabranjeno pušenje discography
- List of songs recorded by Zabranjeno pušenje
