= Zabranjeno Pušenje discography =

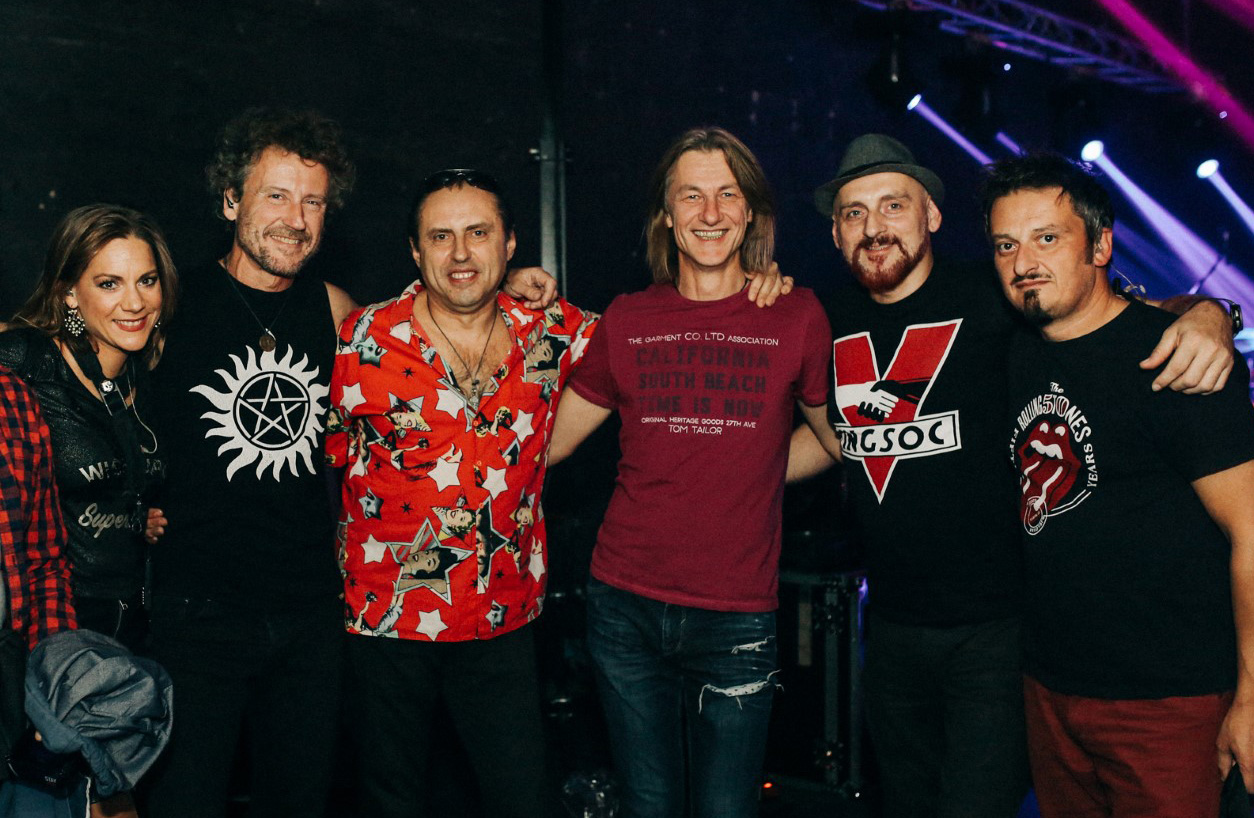
- Studio albums: 12
- Soundtrack albums: 1
- Live albums: 5
- Compilation albums: 3
- Music videos: 50

The Bosnian and former Yugoslav garage rock band Zabranjeno Pušenje since 1984 has released twelve studio albums, five live albums, three compilation albums, one soundtrack album and 50 music videos.

== Albums ==
Source: Zabranjeno pušenje

=== Studio albums ===
List of studio albums, with selected sales figures and certifications
Title	Album details	Sales	Certifications
Das ist Walter	Released: April 10, 1984 (YU); Label: Jugoton; Formats: CD, CS, LP	(YU) 100,000	YUG: Gold
Dok čekaš sabah sa šejtanom	Released: June 11, 1985 (YU); Label: Jugoton; Formats: CD, CS, LP	(YU) 30,000	YUG: Silver
Pozdrav iz zemlje Safari	Released: 1987 (YU); Label: Diskoton; Formats: CD, CS, LP	(YU) 90,000	YUG: Gold
Male priče o velikoj ljubavi	Released: 1989 (YU); Label: Diskoton; Formats: CD, CS, LP	—N/a	—N/a
Fildžan viška	Released: Spring 1997 (BA, HR, SI); Label: Dallas Records, Nimfa Sound; Formats: CD, CS	—N/a	—N/a
Agent tajne sile	Released: June 1999 (BA, HR, YU); Label: Dancing Bear, TLN-Europa, Renome, Nimfa Sound, Active Time; Formats: CD, CS	—N/a	—N/a
Bog vozi Mercedes	Released: December 2001 (BA, HR, YU); Label: Menart, TLN-Europa, Active Time; Formats: CD, CS	35,000	—N/a
Hodi da ti čiko nešto da	Released: November 16, 2006 (BA, HR); 2007 (RS); Label: Civitas, Mascom Records; Formats: CD	(BA) 11,000; (HR) 5,000; (EU) 3,000; (RS) 1,000	—N/a
Muzej revolucije	Released: November 7, 2009 (BA, HR, ME, RS); Label: Hayat Production, Croatia Records, Vijesti, Long Play; Formats: CD, DL	—N/a	—N/a
Radovi na cesti	Released: October 10, 2013 (BA, HR, RS); Label: Tropik, Croatia Records, Dallas Records; Formats: CD, DL	—N/a	—N/a
Šok i nevjerica	Released: October 31, 2018; Label: Tropik, Menart; Formats: CD, DL	—N/a	—N/a
Karamba!	Released: June 3, 2022. (BH, HR, SR); Label: Tropik; Formats: CD, streaming	—N/a	—N/a

=== Live albums ===
List of live albums, with selected sales figures and certifications
Title	Album details	Sales	Certifications
Hapsi sve!	Released: 1998 (HR, YU); Label: Croatia Records, A Records; Formats: CD, CS	—N/a	—N/a
Live in St. Louis	Released: March 22, 2004 (BA, HR, SC); Label: In Takt Records, Menart Records, Mascom Records; Formats: CD, CS	—N/a	—N/a
Live in Skenderija Sarajevo 2018	Released: April 14, 2022 (BA, HR, SR); Label: None; Formats: streaming	—N/a	—N/a
Pušenje ubija	Released: May 15, 2025 (BA, HR, SR); Label: None; Formats: streaming	—N/a	—N/a
Uživo u Lisinskom	Released: July 1, 2025 (BA, HR, SR); Label: None; Formats: streaming	—N/a	—N/a

=== Compilation albums ===
List of compilation albums, with selected sales figures and certifications
Title	Album details	Sales	Certifications
Nikad robom, vazda taxijem	Released: 1996 (BA, HR); Label: TLN-Europa; Formats: CD	—N/a	—N/a
Srce, ruke i lopata	Released: 1998 (BA, HR); Label: TLN-Europa; Formats: CD, CS	—N/a	—N/a
The Ultimate Collection	Released: March 18, 2009 (BA, HR); Label: Croatia Records; Formats: CD	—N/a	—N/a

== Videos ==
List of music videos, showing year released and album
Title	Year	Album
"Neću da budem Švabo u dotiranom filmu"	1984	Das ist Walter
"Abid"	—N/a	Das ist Walter
"Anarhija all over Baščaršija"	—N/a	Das ist Walter
"Ibro dirka"	1985	Dok čekaš sabah sa šejtanom
"Stanje šoka"	—N/a	Dok čekaš sabah sa šejtanom
"Manijak"	—N/a	Pozdrav iz zemlje Safari
"Balada o Pišonji i Žugi"	—N/a	Pozdrav iz zemlje Safari
"Guzonjin sin"	—N/a	Male priče o velikoj ljubavi
"12 sati"	—N/a	Male priče o velikoj ljubavi
"Možeš imat' moje tijelo"	—N/a	Fildžan viška
"Mile Hašišar"	—N/a	Fildžan viška
"Pubertet"	—N/a	Fildžan viška
"Fildžan viška"	—N/a	Fildžan viška
"Guzonjin sin"	—N/a	Hapsi sve! (Live)
"Pos'o, kuća, birtija"	—N/a	Agent tajne sile
"Agent tajne sile"	—N/a	Agent tajne sile
"Jugo 45"	—N/a	Agent tajne sile
"Pupoljak"	—N/a	Agent tajne sile
"Splitska princeza"	—N/a	Bog vozi Mercedes
"Arizona Dream"	—N/a	Bog vozi Mercedes
"Počasna salva"	—N/a	Bog vozi Mercedes
"Lijepa Alma"	—N/a	Bog vozi Mercedes
"Karabaja"	2003	Bog vozi Mercedes
"Bog vozi Mercedes"	2004	Bog vozi Mercedes
"Posljednja oaza (Fikreta)"	2004	Live in St. Louis
"Zenica blues"	2005	Live in St. Louis
"Nema više"	2006	Hodi da ti čiko nešto da
"Dobro dvorište"	2006	Hodi da ti čiko nešto da
"Džana"	2008	Hodi da ti čiko nešto da
"Modni Guru"	2009	Muzej revolucije
"Kladimo se"	2010	Muzej revolucije
"Kada Sena pleše"	2011	Muzej revolucije
"Tvoja bosa stopala"	2011	Muzej revolucije
"Samir-time"	2012	Muzej revolucije
"Boško i Admira"	2013	Radovi na cesti
"Ti voliš sapunice"	2013	Radovi na cesti
"Lutka sa naslovne strane" (feat. Mile Kekin)	2014	2013 Skenderija Live
"Tri kile, tri godine" (feat. Escape)	2015	Radovi na cesti
"U Tvoje ime"	2016	Radovi na cesti
"Klasa optimist"	2016	Radovi na cesti
"Kafana kod Keke"	2017	Radovi na cesti
"Nova godina"	2017	Šok i nevjerica
"Irska"	2018	Šok i nevjerica
"Kupi nas Ali" (feat. Sassja)	2019	Šok i nevjerica
"Lijepa Alma" (feat. Zele Lipovača)	2019	Live in Skenderija Sarajevo 2018
"Korona hit pozitivan" (feat. Elvis J. Kurtović)	2020	Karamba!
"Ekrem"	2022	Karamba!

== Soundtrack albums ==
List of soundtrack albums, with selected sales figures
Title	Album details	Sales
Nafaka	Released: 2006 (BA); Label: F.I.S.T.; Format: CD	—N/a

== See also ==
- List of songs recorded by Zabranjeno pušenje
