= List of songs recorded by Zabranjeno pušenje =

A complete list of known songs written and recorded by the Zabranjeno Pušenje that have been released or have gone unreleased.

== Released songs ==
All songs that appear on albums by Zabranjeno Pušenje.

Name of song, album debut, songwriter(s), lead vocal(s), year released, and notes.
Song	English translation	Album debut	Songwriter(s)	Lead vocal(s)	Year	Notes	Ref(s)
12 sati	12 Hours	Male priče o velikoj ljubavi	Sučić	Nele Karajlić	1989		
Abid	—N/a	Das ist Walter	Sučić, N. Janković	Nele Karajlić	1984		
Agent tajne sile	A Secret Force Agent	Agent tajne sile	Sučić	Sejo Sexon	1999		
Agregat	Aggregate	Hodi da ti čiko nešto da	Sučić	Sejo Sexon	2006		
Anarhija All Over Baščaršija	Anarchy All Over Baščaršija	Das ist Walter	Sučić, D. Janković	Nele Karajlić	1984		
Arizona Dream	—N/a	Bog vozi Mercedes	Sučić	Sejo Sexon	2001		
Balada o Gigi Bosniću	A Ballad about Giga Bosnić	Fildžan viška	Sučić	Sejo Sexon	1997		
Balada o Pišonji i Žugi	A Ballad about Pišonja and Žuga	Pozdrav iz zemlje Safari	Sučić, N. Janković	Nele Karajlić	1987		
Baš Čelik (Prvi Dio)	Head of Steel vol. 1	Dok čekaš sabah sa šejtanom	Sučić, Kaštelan	Nele Karajlić	1985		
Baš Čelik (Drugi Dio)	Head of Steel vol. 2	Dok čekaš sabah sa šejtanom	Sučić, Kaštelan	Nele Karajlić	1985		
Biffe Neretva	—N/a	Hodi da ti čiko nešto da	Sučić	Sejo Sexon	2006		
Bog vozi Mercedes	God drives a Mercedes	Bog vozi Mercedes	Sučić	Sejo Sexon	2001		
Boško i Admira	Boško and Admira	Radovi na cesti	Sučić, Lović, Vestić	Sejo Sexon	2013		
Brut	Brutus	Dok čekaš sabah sa šejtanom	Sučić, Srdić	Nele Karajlić	1985		
Čejeni odlaze...	Cheyenne are leaving	Das ist Walter	Sučić, N. Janković	Nele Karajlić	1984		
Dan republike	Day of the Republic	Pozdrav iz zemlje Safari	Sučić, N. Janković	Nele Karajlić	1987		
Dino	—N/a	Bog vozi Mercedes	Sučić	Sejo Sexon	2001		
Djevojčice kojima miriše koža	Girls whose skin smells	Dok čekaš sabah sa šejtanom	Sučić, D. Janković	Nele Karajlić	1985		
Dobri jarani	Good Friends	Pozdrav iz zemlje Safari	Sučić, Lennon	Nele Karajlić	1987		
Dobro dvorište	The good yard	Hodi da ti čiko nešto da	Sučić	Sejo Sexon	2006		
Dok jezdiš ka Alemanji	While galloping towards Alemannia	Dok čekaš sabah sa šejtanom	Sučić, D. Janković	Nele Karajlić	1985		
Dok čekaš sabah sa šejtanom	While you with devil wait on Fajr prayer	Dok čekaš sabah sa šejtanom	Sučić	Nele Karajlić	1985		
Domovina	Homeland	Hodi da ti čiko nešto da	Sučić, Veličković, Gadžo	Sejo Sexon	2006		
Dr. Džemidžić	—N/a	Agent tajne sile	Sučić	Sejo Sexon	1999		
Džana	Janna	Hodi da ti čiko nešto da	Ostojić	Sejo Sexon	2006		
Džeki	Jacky	Hodi da ti čiko nešto da	Sučić	Sejo Sexon	2006		
Egzotične ljepotice istoka	Exotic Beauties of the East	Radovi na cesti	Sučić, Lović	Sejo Sexon	2013		
Express Folky Star	—N/a	Muzej revolucije	Sučić, Lović, Srdić	Sejo Sexon	2009		
Fildžan viška	An Extra Cup of Coffee	Fildžan viška	Sučić	Sejo Sexon	1997		
Genter	A ladykiller in Police	Bog vozi Mercedes	Sučić	Sejo Sexon	2001		
Gospođa Brams	Mrs. Brams	Dok čekaš sabah sa šejtanom	Sučić	Nele Karajlić	1985		
Guzonjin sin	The Son of a Sucker	Male priče o velikoj ljubavi	Sučić	Nele Karajlić	1989		
Haag	Den Haag	Bog vozi Mercedes	Sučić	Sejo Sexon	2001	Bonus track (MP3 Download Only)	
Haag	—N/a	Hodi da ti čiko nešto da	Sučić	Sejo Sexon	2006		
Hadžija ili bos	Hajji or Boss	Pozdrav iz zemlje Safari	Sučić, N. Janković	Nele Karajlić	1987		
Hajle Selasije	Haile Selassie	Fildžan viška	Sučić, Srdić	Sejo Sexon	1997		
Halid umjesto Halida	Halid Instead of Halid	Fildžan viška	Sučić	Sejo Sexon	1997		
Hodi da ti čiko nešto da	Come, uncle wants to give you something	Hodi da ti čiko nešto da	Sučić	Sejo Sexon	2006		
Ibro dirka	Ibro Touches	Dok čekaš sabah sa šejtanom	Sučić	Nele Karajlić	1985		
Idol	A Role Model	Bog vozi Mercedes	Sučić, Srdić	Sejo Sexon	2001		
Igrač s brojem 2	Number 2 Player	Hodi da ti čiko nešto da	Sučić	Sejo Sexon	2006		
Impossible is Nothing	—N/a	Hodi da ti čiko nešto da	Sučić, Herendić	Sejo Sexon	2006		
Izvini jaro, guzim	Sorry Buddy, I'm Fuckin' from Behind	Agent tajne sile	Sučić	Sejo Sexon	1999		
Javi mi	Let Me Know	Male priče o velikoj ljubavi	Sučić	Nele Karajlić	1989		
Jugo 45	Yugo 45	Agent tajne sile	Sučić	Sejo Sexon	1999		
Kad dernek utihne	The Silence of the Party	Fildžan viška	Sučić	Sejo Sexon	1997		
Kada Sena pleše	When Sena is dancing	Muzej revolucije	Sučić, Lović	Sejo Sexon	2009		
Kafana kod Keke	The Keka's Bar	Radovi na cesti	Sučić, Lović	Sejo Sexon	2013		
Kanjon Drine	Drina Canyon	Male priče o velikoj ljubavi	Sučić, N. Janković	Nele Karajlić	1989		
Karabaja	The Ghost of the Past	Bog vozi Mercedes	Sučić	Sejo Sexon	2001		
Kažu mi da novog frajera imaš	They tell me you have a new guy	Dok čekaš sabah sa šejtanom	Sučić, Srdić	Nele Karajlić	1985		
Kino "Prvi Maj"	1 May Cinema	Das ist Walter	Sučić	Nele Karajlić	1984		
Kladimo se	We Bet	Muzej revolucije	Vestić	Sejo Sexon	2009		
Klasa Optimist	Class Optimist	Radovi na cesti	Sučić, Lović, Trajkov	Sejo Sexon	2013		
Kuhinja	The Kitchen	Dok čekaš sabah sa šejtanom	Sučić	Nele Karajlić	1985		
Laku noć stari	Good night oldman	Hodi da ti čiko nešto da	Sučić	Sejo Sexon	2006		
Lav	A Lion	Radovi na cesti	Sučić, Lović	Sejo Sexon	2013		
Lijepa Alma	Beautiful Alma	Bog vozi Mercedes	Sučić	Sejo Sexon	2001		
Lutka sa naslovne strane	A doll from the cover	Dok čekaš sabah sa šejtanom	Sučić	Nele Karajlić	1985		
Mafija	Mafia	Radovi na cesti	Sučić	Sejo Sexon	2013		
Mali Cviko	Lil' Cviko	Agent tajne sile	Sučić	Sejo Sexon	1999		
Mali Motač Džointa	Lil' Joint-winder	Hodi da ti čiko nešto da	Sučić	Sejo Sexon	2006		
Manijak	Maniac	Pozdrav iz zemlje Safari	Sučić	Nele Karajlić	1987		
Mejtaš	—N/a	Hodi da ti čiko nešto da	Ostojić	Sejo Sexon	2006		
Meteor	Meteor	Pozdrav iz zemlje Safari	Grbić, Sučić, Janković	Nele Karajlić	1987		
Mile Hašišar	Mile the Hashisher	Fildžan viška	Sučić	Sejo Sexon	1997		
Modni Guru	Fashion Guru	Muzej revolucije	Vestić	Sejo Sexon	2009		
Možeš imat' moje tijelo	You Could Have my Body	Fildžan viška	Sučić, Srdić	Sejo Sexon	1997		
Murga Drot	Murga the Cop	Pozdrav iz zemlje Safari	Sučić, N. Janković	Nele Karajlić	1987		
Muzej revolucije	Museum of Revolution	Muzej revolucije	Sučić, Lović	Sejo Sexon	2009		
Ne Me Quitte Pas	Don't Leave Me	Dok čekaš sabah sa šejtanom	Brel, Đozić	Nele Karajlić	1985		
Nedelja kada je otišao Hase	The Sunday When Hase Left	Dok čekaš sabah sa šejtanom	Sučić, N. Janković	Nele Karajlić	1985		
Nema više	There is no more	Hodi da ti čiko nešto da	Sučić, Veličković	Sejo Sexon	2006		
Neprijatelj	The Enemy	Radovi na cesti	Sučić	Sejo Sexon	2013	Bonus track	
Neću da budem švabo u dotiranom filmu	I'm not going to be a German in a funded movie	Das ist Walter	Sučić, Srdić	Nele Karajlić	1984		
Nije to (Čuva Bog Želju svog)	It's not (God keeps his Željo)	Muzej revolucije	Sučić, Lović	Sejo Sexon	2009		
OK Diane	—N/a	Hodi da ti čiko nešto da	Sučić	Sejo Sexon	2006		
Oprosti mi, pape	Forgive me, Dad	Fildžan viška	Sučić, Runjić	Sejo Sexon	1997		
Otpor, Stoko!	A Resistance, Crooks!	Fildžan viška	Sučić	Sejo Sexon	1997		
Pamtim to kao da je bilo danas	I remember it as it was today	Das ist Walter	Sučić	Nele Karajlić	1984		
Penzioneri	Pensioners	Agent tajne sile	Sučić, Srdić	Sejo Sexon	1999		
Piccola Storia de Grande Amore	A Little Stories of a Great Love	Male priče o velikoj ljubavi	Sučić, N. Janković	Nele Karajlić	1989		
Pismo Elvisu	A Letter to Elvis	Fildžan viška	Sučić	Sejo Sexon	1997		
Pismo	A Letter	Agent tajne sile	Sučić	Sejo Sexon	1999		
Pišonja i Žuga u paklu droge	Pišonja and Žuga in a Hell Of Drugs	Male priče o velikoj ljubavi	Sučić	Nele Karajlić	1989		
Pklatovi (I dio)	Masters of Dark Forces vol. 1	Male priče o velikoj ljubavi	Sučić, N. Janković	Nele Karajlić	1989		
Pklatovi (II dio)	Masters of Dark Forces vol. 2	Male priče o velikoj ljubavi	Sučić	Nele Karajlić	1989		
Pos'o, kuća, birtija	A Work, a Home, a Bar	Agent tajne sile	Sučić, Srdić	Sejo Sexon	1999		
Počasna salva	In a city where I wasn't born	Bog vozi Mercedes	Sučić, Sarajlić	Sejo Sexon	2001		
Posljednja oaza (u lošoj formi sam)	The Last Oasis (I'm in a bad shape)	Pozdrav iz zemlje Safari	Sučić	Nele Karajlić	1987		
Pravo zajebani DJ iz Chicaga	A too fucked up DJ from Chicago	Hodi da ti čiko nešto da	Sučić	Sejo Sexon	2006		
Pred zatvorenim šankom	In front of a closed bar	Hodi da ti čiko nešto da	Sučić	Sejo Sexon	2006		
Prigodne riječi	Convenient Words	Muzej revolucije	Sučić, Lović	Sejo Sexon	2009		
Probušeni dolar	A Punctured Dollar	Pozdrav iz zemlje Safari	Sučić	Nele Karajlić	1987		
Pubertet	The Puberty	Fildžan viška	Sučić, Srdić	Sejo Sexon	1997		
Pupoljak	A Bud	Agent tajne sile	Srdić	Sejo Sexon	1999		
Put u središte rudnika Kreka Banovići	Journey to the Center of the Kreka Banovići Mine	Das ist Walter	Sučić, N. Janković	Nele Karajlić	1984		
Radost prvog žita	The Yoy of the First Grain	Dok čekaš sabah sa šejtanom	Sučić, Ognjen Gajić	Nele Karajlić	1985		
Raja iz škole	School Friends	Bog vozi Mercedes	Sučić	Sejo Sexon	2001		
Reci da svemu	Say Yes to Everything	Radovi na cesti	Sučić, Lović	Sejo Sexon	2013		
Sa Čičkom na Stonese	With Čičak to the Rolling Stones	Agent tajne sile	Sučić, Srdić	Sejo Sexon	1999		
Samir-time	Samir's Time	Muzej revolucije	Sučić, Lović	Sejo Sexon	2009		
Sanjao sam noćas da te imam	Tonight I Dreamed that I Had You	Dok čekaš sabah sa šejtanom	Sučić, Srdić	Nele Karajlić	1985		
Selena, vrati se, Selena	Selena, come back	Das ist Walter	Sučić, N. Janković	Nele Karajlić	1984		
Sigurna vremena	Safe times	Hodi da ti čiko nešto da	Sučić	Sejo Sexon	2006		
Splitska princeza	A Princess of Split	Bog vozi Mercedes	Sučić, Velimirović	Sejo Sexon	2001	Bonus track	
Splitska princeza - Intro	A Princess of Split - Intro	Bog vozi Mercedes	Sučić	Sejo Sexon	2001	Bonus track	
Srce, ruke i lopata	Heart, Hands and Shovel	Pozdrav iz zemlje Safari	Sučić, N. Janković	Nele Karajlić	1987		
Stanje šoka	The state of shock	Dok čekaš sabah sa šejtanom	Sučić	Nele Karajlić	1985		
Straža pored Prizrena	The Guard near Prizren	Male priče o velikoj ljubavi	Sučić	Nele Karajlić	1989		
Šareno kamenje	Colorful Stones	Bog vozi Mercedes	Sučić	Sejo Sexon	2001		
Šeki is on the Road Again	—N/a	Das ist Walter	Sučić, N. Janković	Nele Karajlić	1984		
Tako ti je, mala moja, kad ljubi Bosanac		Hapsi sve!	Bregović	Sejo Sexon	1998	Bijelo Dugme cover	
Takvim sjajem	Such a shine	Hodi da ti čiko nešto da	Dedić	Sejo Sexon	2006		
Test za dženet	A Test for Heaven	Fildžan viška	Sučić	Sejo Sexon	1997		
Ti voliš sapunice	You Like Soap operas	Radovi na cesti	Sučić, Lović	Sejo Sexon	2013		
Tigar iz Kladnja	A Tiger from Kadanj	Bog vozi Mercedes	Sučić	Sejo Sexon	2001		
Tijesno	Tight	Muzej revolucije	Sučić, Lović	Sejo Sexon	2009		
Tragovi suza	Traces of Tears	Agent tajne sile	Sučić, Srdić, Šaran	Sejo Sexon	1999		
Tri kile, tri godine	Three Kilograms, Three Years	Radovi na cesti	Sučić, Lović	Sejo Sexon	2013		
Tvoja bosa stopala	Your shoeless feet	Muzej revolucije	Sučić, Lović	Sejo Sexon	2009		
U gradu gdje nisam rođen	In a city where I wasn't born	Muzej revolucije	Sučić, Lović	Sejo Sexon	2009		
U tvoje ime	In Your Name	Radovi na cesti	Sučić	Sejo Sexon	2013		
Ujka Sam	Uncle Sam	Dok čekaš sabah sa šejtanom	Sučić, N. Janković	Nele Karajlić	1985		
Ustanova	The Institution	Muzej revolucije	Sučić, Lović, Boldižar	Sejo Sexon	2009		
Uvod	Intro	Das ist Walter	Adamič	Nele Karajlić	1984	A theme music from Walter Defends Sarajevo	
Učini da budem vuk	Make me a wolf	Dok čekaš sabah sa šejtanom	Sučić, N. Janković, Mitić	Nele Karajlić	1985		
Vještica	A Witch	Agent tajne sile	Sučić, Srdić	Sejo Sexon	1999		
Zenica Blues	—N/a	Das ist Walter	Sučić, Johnny Cash	Nele Karajlić	1984		
Zvijezda nad Balkanom	The Star Above the Balkans	Male priče o velikoj ljubavi	Sučić	Nele Karajlić	1989		

== Other songs ==
All songs that do not appear on studio albums, and their releases.

Name of song, releases, songwriter(s), performer(s), year released, and notes.
Song	Performer(s)	Releases	Year	Songwriter(s)	Ref(s)
Laku noć stari	Zabranjeno pušenje, Sakin Modronja	Nafaka soundtrack	2006	Sučić	
Niz mahalu kreni	Zabranjeno pušenje, Lucija Šerbedžija	Nafaka soundtrack	2006	Sučić, Velimirović	
Ramastain	Zabranjeno pušenje	Nafaka soundtrack	2006	Sučić	
S tobom ili bez tebe	Zabranjeno pušenje, Halid Bešlić, Lucija Šerbedžija	Nafaka soundtrack	2006	Sučić, Velimirović	
S tobom ili bez tebe	Zabranjeno pušenje	Nafaka soundtrack	2006	Sučić, Velimirović	
Svadba – Behari	Zabranjeno pušenje, Ismet Kurtović, Arabeske	Nafaka soundtrack	2006	Sučić, Šaban Gadžo	

== See also ==
- Zabranjeno pušenje discography
