= The Ultimate Collection (Zabranjeno pušenje album) =

Greatest hits album by Zabranjeno Pušenje
- Released: March 18, 2009
- Recorded: 1984–2005
- Studio: Various
- Genres: Garage rock; new primitivism
- Length: 2 hours, 28:31
- Languages: Bosnian, Serbo-Croatian
- Label: Croatia Records
- Producer: Želimir Babogredac

Zabranjeno Pušenje chronology
Hodi da ti čiko nešto da (2006)	The Ultimate Collection (2009)	Muzej revolucije (2009)

The Ultimate Collection is the third greatest hits album and by Bosnian rock band Zabranjeno Pušenje, released on March 18, 2009. The double-full-length album was released through Croatia Records.

== Track listing ==
Source: Croatia Records, Discogs

Disc One
No.	Title	Album	Length
1.	"Selena, vrati se, Selena"	Das ist Walter, 1984	4:03
2.	"Pamtim to kao da je bilo danas"	Das ist Walter	2:07
3.	"Zenica Blues"	Das ist Walter	2:27
4.	"Šeki is on the Road Again"	Das ist Walter	3:35
5.	"Anarhija All Over Baščaršija"	Das ist Walter	1:38
6.	"Stanje šoka"	Dok čekaš sabah sa šejtanom, 1985	3:10
7.	"Djevojčice kojima miriše koža"	Dok čekaš sabah sa šejtanom	3:52
8.	"Lutka sa naslovne strane"	Dok čekaš sabah sa šejtanom	3:32
9.	"Dok čekaš sabah sa šejtanom"	Dok čekaš sabah sa šejtanom	4:43
10.	"Nedelja kada je otišao Hase"	Dok čekaš sabah sa šejtanom	4:07
11.	"Kažu mi da novog frajera imaš"	Dok čekaš sabah sa šejtanom	3:42
12.	"Ibro dirka"	Dok čekaš sabah sa šejtanom	3:20
13.	"Hadžija ili bos"	Pozdrav iz zemlje Safari, 1987	4:11
14.	"Dan republike"	Pozdrav iz zemlje Safari	3:42
15.	"Balada o Pišonji i Žugi"	Pozdrav iz zemlje Safari	5:30
16.	"Posljednja oaza (u lošoj formi sam)"	Pozdrav iz zemlje Safari	3:32
17.	"Srce, ruke i lopata"	Pozdrav iz zemlje Safari	4:36
18.	"Murga Drot"	Pozdrav iz zemlje Safari	4:12
19.	"Guzonjin sin"	Male priče o velikoj ljubavi, 1989	4:03
20.	"Pišonja i Žuga u paklu droge"	Male priče o velikoj ljubavi	5:17
Total length:			75:19

Disc Two
No.	Title	Album	Length
1.	"Možeš imat' moje tijelo"	Fildžan viška, 1997	4:49
2.	"Mile Hašišar"	Fildžan viška	3:53
3.	"Halid umjesto Halida"	Fildžan viška	5:23
4.	"Agent tajne sile"	Agent tajne sile, 1999	3:25
5.	"Pos'o, kuća, birtija"	Agent tajne sile	4:28
6.	"Lijepa Alma"	Bog vozi Mercedes, 2001	3:57
7.	"Karabaja"	Bog vozi Mercedes	4:31
8.	"Počasna salva"	Bog vozi Mercedes	5:13
9.	"Fildžan viška (Live)"	Live in St. Louis, 2004	5:37
10.	"Test za Dženet (Live)"	Live in St. Louis	4:25
11.	"Jugo 45 (Live)"	Live in St. Louis	5:01
12.	"Nema više"	Hodi da ti čiko nešto da, 2006	4:06
13.	"Dobro dvorište"	Hodi da ti čiko nešto da	4:52
14.	"Agregat"	Hodi da ti čiko nešto da	4:11
15.	"Džana"	Hodi da ti čiko nešto da	4:13
16.	"Laku noć stari"	Hodi da ti čiko nešto da	5:08
Total length:			73:12

== Personnel ==
Credits adapted from the album's liner notes.

Production

- Klaudija Čular – editing (Sony DADC in Salzburg, Austria)
- Želimir Babogredac – production

Design

- Igor Kelčec – design
