= Đani Pervan =

Bosnian musician

- Born: Sarajevo, SR Bosnia and Herzegovina, SFR Yugoslavia
- Genres: Rock; pop rock; garage rock; alternative rock; electronic
- Occupations: Musician; record producer; arranger; sound engineer
- Instruments: Drums; percussion; bass guitar; electric guitar; vocals
- Years active: 1983–present
- Labels: Diskoton; Menart; Croatia Records; City Records; Metropolis Records

Đani Pervan is a Bosnian musician, songwriter, record producer, and sound engineer.

== Life and career ==
Pervan was born and raised in Sarajevo, SR Bosnia and Herzegovina. He is a self-taught musician.

In 1985, Pervan joined the rock band Letu štuke where he performed as a drummer on their demo songs. In 1987, Pervan joined the rock band Major as a drummer, and contributed their first studio album; Son Late Zigi Daj (1989). As a drummer, Pervan joined jazz band Don Guido i Misionari in 1990.

In 1994, Pervan moved to Paris, France, with the pop-rock band Overdream, which also consisted of Samir Ćeramida, Dušan Vranić, Sejo Kovo, and Boris Bačvić. The band released their only studio album in 1996. In 1996, Pervan accompanied Sejo Sexon and Elvis J. Kurtović to restart the band Zabranjeno Pušenje. He performed on their fifth studio album, Fildžan viška, which was released in 1997.

American singer-songwriter Michael Stipe hired Pervan and Dušan Vranić to make remixes of two songs, "I've Been High" and "Beachball", from R.E.M.'s 2001 album Reveal (2001); Pervan and Vranić recorded the remixes under the name Chef.

In 2001, Pervan accompanied Darko Rundek with whom he co-produced his studio album Ruke (2002). He also joined the Darko Rundek & Cargo Orkestar at the same time.

In 2005, Pervan returned to Sarajevo to work with his original band Letu Štuke.

== Discography ==
Major

- Son Late Zigi Daj (1989)

Overdream

- Overdream (1996)

Zabranjeno pušenje

- Fildžan viška (1997)

Darko Rundek & Cargo Orkestar

- Ruke (2002)
- Zagrebačka Magla: Plava turneja 2003 Live (2004)
- Mhm A-ha Oh Yeah Da-Da! (2006)
- Live u Domu omladine (2008)

Letu štuke

- Letu štuke (2005)
- Proteini i ugljikohidrati (2008)
- Brojevi računa (2011)
