= Darko Ostojić =

Bosnian musician

- Born: 23 March 1965 (age 60); Sarajevo, SR Bosnia and Herzegovina, SFR Yugoslavia
- Other names: Ogi; Minka; Oggie The Kid
- Occupations: Musician; actor
- Years active: 1980–present
- Musical career
- Genres: Classical; Rock; Garage rock
- Instruments: Bass guitar; vocals; double bass
- Label: Diskoton

Darko Ostojić (Serbian Cyrillic: Дарко Остојић; born 23 March 1965), known by his nickname Ogi, is a Bosnian musician and actor.

He first found mainstream success for his portrayal of Minka and Cane Prebranac in the TV Sarajevo sketch comedy series Top lista nadrealista. Furthermore, during the late 1980s, he was a member of the garage rock band Zabranjeno Pušenje. His other TV roles include Složna braća and Nadreality Show.

== Early life ==
Born in Sarajevo, SR Bosnia and Herzegovina, SFR Yugoslavia to a classical violinist father, Kamenko Ostojić, and architect mother, Laura, who worked as project manager in the wood industry, Ostojić was raised in the neighbourhood of Mejtaš with a younger brother, Dejan.

Growing up exposed to different genres of music in a family of a professional musician, young Ostojić took up acoustic bass and bass guitar simultaneously to his elementary and later secondary (gymnasium) education. Furthermore, with his father taking side jobs performing at various Yugoslav pop/schlager music festivals, such as Opatija and Beogradsko proleće, the youngster would often be brought along and got to soak in the scene and atmosphere among professional musicians.

== Career ==
=== Rock music ===
In 1980, Ostojić and his friend Dado Džihan formed a rock band with a spiritual touch called Nirvana, later changed to Cyclone. A few years later, both of them joined garage rock band Zabranjeno Pušenje.

Ostojić joined Zabranjeno Pušenje in 1987. He performed on their two studio albums in the 1980s; Pozdrav iz zemlje Safari (1987) and Male priče o velikoj ljubavi (1989). In 1990, he parted ways with the band together with other members.

=== Television ===
In 1988, Ostojić made his acting debut in the TV Sarajevo family television series Tragom ptice dodo directed by Timothy John Byford. The following year, he joined Top lista nadrealista ahead of the show's second series.

=== Classical music ===
Most recently, Ostojić has been playing double bass for the Sarajevo Philharmonic Orchestra. He also performed in the orchestra from 1996 to 2002.

== Discography ==
Zabranjeno pušenje

- Pozdrav iz zemlje Safari (1987)
- Male priče o velikoj ljubavi (1989)

== Filmography ==
Year	Title	Role	Notes
1988	Tragom ptice dodo (TV Series)	Strašimir's gang member	
1989–1991	Top lista nadrealista (TV Series)	Minka / Cane Vukić Prebranac / Other roles	Seasons 2, 3
1996	Složna braća (TV Series)	Mehmed "Memara" Halimić / Nana	
2005	Sex i selo (TV Series)	Baba Gaga	
2007	Nadreality Show (TV Series)		
2010	Lud, zbunjen, normalan (TV Series)	Kritičar 2	Season 3, Episode: 23
2020	Minka Show (TV Series)	Minka	
2022	Složna braća — Next Đeneration (TV Series)	Nana Halimić	Season 1, 12 episodes

== Personal ==
Ostojić's brother Dejan also became a musician, playing guitar in Sarajevo-based rock bands Letu štuke and Skroz.
