= Srce, ruke i lopata =

Greatest hits album by Zabranjeno Pušenje
- Released: 1998
- Recorded: 1984–1989
- Genre: Garage rock; new primitivism
- Length: 48:38
- Language: Serbo-Croatian
- Label: TLN-Europa
- Producer: Sejo Sexon; Mustafa Čengić; Mahmut Paša Ferović; Sven Rustempašić

Zabranjeno Pušenje chronology
Fildžan viška (1997)	Srce, ruke i lopata (1998)	Hapsi sve! (1998)

Srce, ruke i lopata – Best of 2: Najveći Hitovi (transl. A Heart, Hands and a Shovel – Best Of 2: The Greatest Hits) is the second greatest hits album and by Bosnian and former Yugoslav rock band Zabranjeno Pušenje, released in 1998. It's released through TLN-Europa.

== Track listing ==
Source: Discogs

No.	Title	Album	Length
1.	"Neću da budem Švabo u dotiranom filmu"	Das ist Walter, 1984	2:30
2.	"Abid"	Das ist Walter	3:40
3.	"Dok čekaš sabah sa šejtanom"	Dok čekaš sabah sa šejtanom, 1985	4:43
4.	"Nedelja kada je otišao Hase"	Dok čekaš sabah sa šejtanom	4:07
5.	"Srce, ruke i lopata"	Pozdrav iz zemlje Safari, 1987	4:36
6.	"Dan republike"	Pozdrav iz zemlje Safari	3:42
7.	"Manijak"	Pozdrav iz zemlje Safari	3:10
8.	"Murga Drot"	Pozdrav iz zemlje Safari	4:12
9.	"Piccola Storia Di Grande Amore"	Male priče o velikoj ljubavi, 1989	5:01
10.	"12 sati"	Male priče o velikoj ljubavi	3:54
11.	"Pišonja i Žuga u paklu droge"	Male priče o velikoj ljubavi	5:17
12.	"Javi mi"	Male priče o velikoj ljubavi	3:46
Total length:			48:38

== Personnel ==
Credits adapted from the album's liner notes.

Production

- Sejo Sexon – production
- Mustafa Čengić Mujo Snažni – production
- Mahmut Paša Ferović – production
- Sven Rustempašić – production

Design

- Zenit Đozić – design, photos
- Srđan Velimirović – design, photos
