= Nikad robom, vazda taxijem =

Greatest hits album by Zabranjeno Pušenje
- Released: 1996
- Recorded: 1984–1989
- Genre: Garage rock, new primitivism
- Length: 55:20
- Language: Serbo-Croatian
- Label: TLN-Europa
- Producer: Sejo Sexon; Mustafa Čengić; Mahmut Paša Ferović; Sven Rustempašić

Zabranjeno Pušenje chronology
| Male priče o velikoj ljubavi (1989) | Nikad robom, vazda taxijem (1996) | Fildžan viška (1997) |

Nikad robom, vazda taxijem – Best of 1: Najveći hitovi '84.–'89. (transl. Never a Slave, Always by Taxi – Best of 1: The Greatest Hits '84–'89) is the first greatest hits album and by Bosnian and former Yugoslav rock band Zabranjeno Pušenje, released in 1996. It's released through TLN-Europa.

== Track listing ==
Source: Discogs

| No. | Title | Album | Length |
|---|---|---|---|
| 1. | "Hadžija ili bos" | Pozdrav iz zemlje Safari, 1987 | 4:11 |
| 2. | "Balada o Pišonji i Žugi" | Pozdrav iz zemlje Safari | 5:30 |
| 3. | "Selena, vrati se, Selena" | Das ist Walter, 1984 | 4:03 |
| 4. | "Djevojčice kojima miriše koža" | Dok čekaš sabah sa šejtanom, 1985 | 3:52 |
| 5. | "Anarhija All Over Baščaršija" | Das ist Walter | 1:42 |
| 6. | "Lutka sa naslovne strane" | Dok čekaš sabah sa šejtanom | 3:32 |
| 7. | "Šeki is on the Road Again" | Das ist Walter | 3:35 |
| 8. | "Vuk" | Dok čekaš sabah sa šejtanom | 3:40 |
| 9. | "Šokiraš me majke mi (Stanje šoka)" | Dok čekaš sabah sa šejtanom | 3:10 |
| 10. | "Zenica Blues" | Das ist Walter | 2:27 |
| 11. | "Fikreta (Posljednja oaza)" | Pozdrav iz zemlje Safari | 3:32 |
| 12. | "Ibro dirka" | Dok čekaš sabah sa šejtanom | 3:20 |
| 13. | "Guzonjin sin" | Male priče o velikoj ljubavi, 1989 | 4:03 |
| 14. | "Kanjon Drine" | Male priče o velikoj ljubavi | 1:58 |
| 15. | "Na straži pored Prizrena" | Male priče o velikoj ljubavi | 4:02 |
| 16. | "Baš Čelik" | Dok čekaš sabah sa šejtanom | 2:43 |
| Total length: | | | 55:20 |

== Personnel ==
Credits adapted from the album's liner notes.

Production

- Sejo Sexon – production
- Mustafa Čengić Mujo Snažni – production
- Mahmut Paša Ferović – production
- Sven Rustempašić – production

Design

- Zenit Đozić – design, photos
- Srđan Velimirović – design, photos
