= Predrag Kovačević =

Bosnian guitarist

- Born: Sarajevo, SR Bosnia and Herzegovina, SFR Yugoslavia
- Other names: Kova; Kowalski
- Occupations: Musician; music supervisor; Engineer
- Years active: 1986–1989
- Musical career
- Genres: New Primitivism; Rock; Garage rock
- Instruments: Lead guitar; rhythm guitar; acoustic guitar
- Label: Diskoton

Predrag Kovačević, known by his nickname Kova, is a Bosnian guitarist. He first found mainstream success as a 1980s lineup member of a Bosnian garage rock band Zabranjeno Pušenje.

== Career ==
Kovačević joined a Sarajevo-based rock band Zabranjeno Pušenje in 1986, after their lead guitarist Mustafa Čengić left. As a lead guitarist, he performed on their two studio albums: Pozdrav iz zemlje Safari (1987) and Male priče o velikoj ljubavi (1989). In early 1990, he left the band with some other members.

In 2018 and 2019, Kovačević had some guest appearances at live concerts of Nele Karajlić, former lead vocalist of Zabranjeno Pušenje.

Kovačević has been living in Edmonton, AB since the 1990s working as an engineer, finishing the Faculty of Civil Engineering.

== Discography ==
Zabranjeno pušenje

- Pozdrav iz zemlje Safari (1987)
- Male priče o velikoj ljubavi (1989)
