= Dušan Vranić =

Bosnian musician

- Also known as: Duco; Dutso; V. Eliane
- Born: Sarajevo, SR Bosnia and Herzegovina, SFR Yugoslavia
- Genres: Rock; pop rock; garage rock; alternative rock; gypsy style; electronic
- Occupation: Musician
- Instruments: Vocals; keyboards; drums; percussion; sitar
- Formerly of: Zabranjeno Pušenje; Sikter

Dušan Vranić, known by his nickname Duco, is a Bosnian musician who is a member of the Darko Rundek's band. Formerly, he was a member of a Bosnian garage rock band Zabranjeno Pušenje.

== Life and career ==
Vranić was born and raised in Sarajevo, SR Bosnia and Herzegovina. He is a self-taught musician.

In 1994, Vranić came to France with a pop-rock band Overdream. Next to him, the band members are Samir Ćeramida, Đani Pervan, Sejo Kovo, and Boris Bačvić. The band released their only studio album in 1996.

In 1996, Vranić accompanied Sejo Sexon and Elvis J. Kurtović, with whom he restarted band Zabranjeno Pušenje, disbanded in the early 1990s. He performed on their fifth studio album, Fildžan viška, which was released in 1997.

American singer-songwriter Michael Stipe hired Vranić and Đani Pervan to make remixes of two songs, "I've Been High" and "Beachball", from R.E.M.'s album Reveal (2001). The two of them did mentioned remixes under pseudonym Chef.

In 2001, Vranić accompanied Darko Rundek with whom he performed on his studio album Ruke (2002). Later, Vranić and Rundek founded Rundek Cargo Orkestar, as well as Rundek Cargo Trio. Three musicians, Vranić, Rundek, and a Swiss violinist Isabel Catala released two studio albums as Rundek Cargo Trio; Plavi avion (2010) and Mostovi (2015).

== Discography ==
Overdream

- Overdream (1996)

Zabranjeno pušenje

- Fildžan viška (1997)

Darko Rundek & Cargo Orkestar

- Ruke (2002)
- Zagrebačka Magla: Plava turneja 2003 Live (2004)
- Mhm A-ha Oh Yeah Da-Da! (2006)
- Live u Domu omladine (2008)

Rundek Cargo Trio

- Plavi Avion (2010)
- Mostovi (2015)
- Generacija '68 Soundtrack (2016)

- Dusan Vranic (2025)
