= Sejo Kovo =

Bosnian guitarist

Sead Kovo
- Also known as: Sejo; Seyo
- Born: Sead Kovo; 1970 (age 55–56); Sarajevo, SR Bosnia and Herzegovina, SFR Yugoslavia
- Genres: Rock; pop rock; folk-pop; garage rock
- Occupation: Musician
- Instruments: Lead guitar; rhythm guitar; vocals
- Years active: 1984–present

Sead "Sejo" Kovo (born 1970) is a Bosnian guitarist and songwriter. Formerly, he was a member of a Bosnian garage rock band Zabranjeno Pušenje.

== Life and career ==
Kovo was born and raised in Sarajevo, SR Bosnia and Herzegovina in 1970.

In 1994, Kovo moved to Paris, France, with a pop-rock band Overdream. Next to him, the band members are Samir Ćeramida, Dušan Vranić, Đani Pervan, and Boris Bačvić. The band released their only studio album in 1996.

In 1996, Kovo accompanied Sejo Sexon and Elvis J. Kurtović, with whom he restarted band Zabranjeno Pušenje, disbanded in the early 1990s. He performed on two studio albums; Fildžan viška (1997) and Agent tajne sile (1999).

In 2007, Kovo released his solo album Je Tombe. Most of the recorded songs are in French, while in English and Bosnian there are three songs in total.

== Discography ==
Studio albums

- REBEL ROCK (2018)
- BALKAN PANORAMA (2016)
- De passage (2012)
- Je Tombe (2008)
- GRUNGE PARTY (2007)
- JUNGLE & X GROOVES (2000)

Overdream

- Overdream (1996)

Zabranjeno Pušenje

- Fildžan viška (1997)
- Agent tajne sile (1999)
