= Skroz =

Bosnian rock band

Background information
- Origin: Sarajevo, Bosnia and Herzegovina
- Genres: Rock, pop rock
- Years active: 1996–present
- Labels: Croatia Records, Menart, Bock, Kappa

Skroz is a Bosnian rock band formed in Sarajevo in 1996. Known for their energetic pop-rock sound and socially conscious lyrics, they are considered one of the notable rock acts to emerge from Bosnia and Herzegovina’s post-war music scene.

== History ==
=== Formation and early years (1996–1999) ===
Skroz was founded in Sarajevo in 1996 by vocalist and songwriter Adnan Šaran, drummer Nedžad Mulaomerović, bassist Mirza Suljagić, and guitarist Sloven Anzulović. The musicians were active in Sarajevo’s alternative and rock circles and had prior connections with established cultural projects and bands.

The group rehearsed and performed locally before adopting the name Skroz in late 1997. Their first radio appearance followed that same year. In 1998 they performed at the Rock Otočec festival in Slovenia, presenting songs that later appeared on their debut release.

=== Debut album and breakthrough (2000–2003) ===
The band’s self-titled debut album, Skroz, was recorded in Amsterdam and released in 2000. The single "Sve sam jači" received significant radio airplay and helped establish the group across Bosnia and Herzegovina. Concert activity throughout the region followed, expanding their audience.

=== Subsequent releases (2004–2009) ===
Their second album, "Savršeni Organizam" (2004), featured songs such as "Super žena" and "Srušio sam stan", strengthening their regional popularity.

Their third studio album, "Regija", released in 2008/2009, continued their blend of melodic rock with socially reflective themes.

=== Later activity ===
In addition to album releases, Skroz has issued a number of singles performed regularly at concerts, including "Afganistan", "Igraj Bosno", "Amerikanac", and "Raj". The band has remained active on the live circuit, appearing at festivals and major venues.

== Documentary ==
In 2022, a music documentary film titled Skroz Sarajevo was released, chronicling the history and experiences of the band and its frontman, Adnan Šaran. Directed by Nenad Đurić and produced by Omar Kuštrić, the film premiered at the 28th Sarajevo Film Festival and is available to watch on YouTube. It explores the band’s beginnings in Sarajevo, their war and postwar experiences, tours, successes and struggles, as well as personal and familial challenges faced by the members. The documentary also touches on elements of Sarajevo’s subculture and includes appearances by friends and fans of the band such as Elvis J. Kurtović, Feđa Štukan, Letu štuke, Sikter, Bure, Marko Louis, and Branislav Trifunović.

== Members ==
=== Current members ===
- Adnan Šaran – vocals, songwriting
- Dejan Ostojić – bass guitar
- Nedžad Mulaomerović – drums
- Elvir Salčinović – guitar
- Nino Škiljić – keyboards

=== Former members ===
- Mirza Suljagić – bass guitar
- Sloven Anzulović – guitar

== Musical style ==
Skroz’s music combines melodic rock structures with elements of pop rock. Their lyrics often explore personal themes alongside social commentary, while their live performances are noted for their energetic delivery.

== Discography ==
=== Studio albums ===
- Skroz (2000)
- Savršeni Organizam (2004)
- Regija (2008/2009)

=== Selected singles ===
- "Sve sam jači"
- "Super žena"
- "Srušio sam stan"
- "Afganistan"
- "Igraj Bosno"
- "Amerikanac"
- "Raj"
