= Marin Gradac =

Bosnian musician

- Also known as: Maka / Mako
- Genres: Classical; garage rock
- Occupation: Musician
- Instruments: Trombone; vocals

Marin Gradac is a Bosnian musician who is a trombonist for the Sarajevo Philharmonic Orchestra. Formerly, he was a member of a Bosnian garage rock band Zabranjeno Pušenje.

== Career ==
In 1996, Gradac accompanied Sejo Sexon and Elvis J. Kurtović, with whom he restarted the band Zabranjeno Pušenje, disbanded in the early 1990s. He sang and performed on two studio albums; Fildžan viška (1997) and Agent tajne sile (1999). Also, Gradac performed on their first live album; Hapsi sve! (1998). According to Sejo Sexon, Gradac was a really good singer, but the fans didn't accept him, especially the core ones. Gradac left Zabranjeno Pušenje in 2000 due to other commitments; he went to complete the Sarajevo Music Academy.

Gradac has been playing a trombone for the Sarajevo Philharmonic Orchestra.

Gradas is an executive producer of the Sarajevo Big Band and a board member of the Saraj Pro-Brass Musicians Association.

== Discography ==
Zabranjeno pušenje

- Fildžan viška (1996)
- Hapsi sve! (1998)
- Agent tajne sile (1999)
