= Hapsi sve! =

Live album by Zabranjeno Pušenje
- Released: 1998
- Recorded: July 10 and September 25, 1997
- Venue: Dom Sportova, Zagreb, Croatia; Metalac, Sarajevo, Bosnia and Herzegovina
- Genre: Garage rock; new primitivism
- Length: 73:45
- Language: Bosnian
- Label: Croatia Records; A Records
- Producer: Sejo Sexon; Zlaja Hadžić

Zabranjeno Pušenje chronology
Srce, ruke i lopata (1998)	Hapsi sve! (1998)	Agent tajne sile (1999)

Singles from Hapsi sve!
- 1. "Guzonjin sin"

Hapsi sve! (transl. Arrest 'em All) is the first live album by Bosnian rock band Zabranjeno Pušenje, released in 1998. It was released through Croatia Records in Croatia and A Records in Yugoslavia.

== Recording ==
The songs are recorded over two nights at Dom Sportova, in Zagreb on July 10, 1997, and at the Metalac school yard in Sarajevo on September 25, 1997.

== Track listing ==
Source: Discogs

No.	Title	Album	Length
1.	"Balada o Pišonji i Žugi"	Pozdrav iz zemlje Safari, 1987	6:13
2.	"Lutka sa naslovne strane"	Dok čekaš sabah sa šejtanom, 1985	4:05
3.	"Guzonjin sin"	Male priče o velikoj ljubavi, 1989	4:22
4.	"Ko te kara nek' ti piše pjesme"		2:34
5.	"Nedelja kada je otišao Hase"	Dok čekaš sabah sa šejtanom	5:43
6.	"Dan republike"	Pozdrav iz zemlje Safari	4:52
7.	"Na straži pored Prizrena"	Male priče o velikoj ljubavi	4:21
8.	"Šeki is on the Road Again"	Das ist Walter, 1984	4:15
9.	"Piccola Storia Di Grande Amore"	Male priče o velikoj ljubavi	10:02
10.	"Fikreta (Posljednja oaza)"	Pozdrav iz zemlje Safari	4:04
11.	"Ibro dirka"	Dok čekaš sabah sa šejtanom	8:04
12.	"Zenica Blues"	Das ist Walter	2:15
13.	"Halid umjesto Halida"	Fildžan viška, 1997	5:10
14.	"Tako ti je, mala moja, kad ljubi Bosanac"	Šta bi dao da si na mom mjestu, Bijelo dugme, 1975	7:45
Total length:			73:45

== Personnel ==
Credits adapted from the album's liner notes.

Zabranjeno Pušenje

- Marin Gradac Mako – trombone, vocals, backing vocals
- Sejo Sexon – lead vocals, guitar, backing vocals
- Elvis J. Kurtovich – vocals, reciting
- Predrag Bobić Bleka – bass, backing vocals
- Zoran Stojanović – electric guitar
- Nedžad Podžić Počko – keyboards, backing vocals
- Branko Trajkov Trak – drums
- Bruno Urlić Prco – violin, backing vocals (Vlahov String Quartet)

Additional musicians

- Žana Marendić – vocals (track 9)
- Drago Lokas – harmonica
- Marijan Jakić – saxophone
- Ljubica Kelćec – vocals (Grlice Vocal Duo)
- Kristina Biluš – vocals (Grlice Vocal Duo)
- Robert Boldižar – violin (Vlahov String Quartet)
- Nina Sučić – viola (Vlahov String Quartet)
- Josip Petrač – cello (Vlahov String Quartet)
- Mihovil Karuza – cello (Vlahov String Quartet)

Production

- Sejo Sexon – production
- Zlaja Hadžić Jeff – production, mastering (Rent-A-Cow Studio in Amsterdam, the Netherlands)
- Alan Ward – mastering (Electric City in Brussels, Belgium)
- Amir Bahtijarević – executive production
- Denis Mujadžić Denyken – recording
- Đani Pervan – recording

Backstage crew

- Dario Vitez – stage manager
- Nosači Zvuka – road crew
- Nebojša Stamenković – lighting, sound system
- Željko Radočaj – lighting, sound system

Design

- Dario Vitez – design
- Sejo Sexon – design
- Ivica Propadalo – design
- Haris Memija – photos
