= Dragomir Herendić =

Croatian guitarist and record producer

- Also known as: Dragianni
- Genres: Heavy metal; rock; pop rock
- Occupations: Musician; producer; sound engineer
- Instruments: Lead guitar; electric guitar; acoustic guitar

Dragomir Herendić, known by his stage name Dragianni, is a Croatian guitarist, sound engineer, and record producer.

== Career ==
In 1999, Herendić joined the Bosnian garage rock band Zabranjeno Pušenje. He performed, recorded and produced their seventh studio albums Bog vozi Mercedes (2001), as well as on a live album; Live in St. Louis (2004). He left the band in 2004.

== Discography ==
Zabranjeno pušenje

- Bog vozi Mercedes (2001)
- Live in St. Louis (2004)
