= Bruno Urlić =

- Born: 11 November 1975 (age 50); Sarajevo, SR Bosnia and Herzegovina, SFR Yugoslavia
- Genres: Classical rock; rock; folk rock; jazz rock
- Occupations: Musician; producer
- Instruments: violin; viola; keyboards
- Years active: 1991–present

Bruno Urlić (born 11 November 1975), is a Bosnian violinist and record producer. He is a current member of the Massimo's band and a former member of rock band Zabranjeno Pušenje.

== Life and career ==
Urlić was born and raised in Sarajevo, SFR Yugoslavia (nowadays Bosnia and Herzegovina) to parents who were musicians. In 1991, he joined pop-rock band Kosa, where he played keyboards. Two years later, he enrolled in the Sarajevo Music Academy but withdrew shortly due to War in Bosnia. In Summer 1994, he accompanied Sarajevo's musicians and Indian conductor Zubin Mehta who performed Mozart's Requiem at the Sarajevo City Hall concert. By the end of the year, he had left Sarajevo and joined the Bruno Orchestra on their three-month Italy tour. Later, he decided to move permanently to Zagreb, Croatia. Urlić earned his degree in violin from the Academy of Music, University of Zagreb in 1998.

In 1997, Urlić joined Bosnian rock band Zabranjeno Pušenje. He performed on their two studio albums, Agent tajne sile (1999) and Bog vozi Mercedes (2001), as well as on two live albums; Hapsi sve! (1998) and Live in St. Louis (2004). He left the band in 2004 and joined a Macedonian folk band Ezerki & 7/8 from Zagreb. In Summer 2013, he joined the band of Massimo Savić.

Urlić is a member of the Damir Kukuruzović gypsy-jazz quartet. Together with Kukuruzović, he has collaborated with relevant performers of the genre such as Angelo Debarre, Raphaël Faÿs and Wawau Adler. He is also a member and producer of Mavi Kan, an ethno-jazz trio. As a session musician he collaborated with many musicians from former Yugoslavia, such as Rade Šerbedžija, Zoran Predin, Severina, Hladno Pivo, Gibonni, Darko Rundek, Kemal Monteno, Hari Mata Hari, Crvena jabuka, Toše Proeski.

== Discography ==
Zabranjeno pušenje

- Hapsi sve! (1998)
- Agent tajne sile (1999)
- Bog vozi Mercedes (2001)
- Live in St. Louis (2004)
- Hodi da ti čiko nešto da (2006) (Guest appearance)
