= Albin Jarić =

Bosnian musician

- Born: 1953; Zenica, PR Bosnia and Herzegovina, FPR Yugoslavia
- Died: 2023 (aged 69–70); Ljubljana, Republic of Slovenia
- Other name: Jimi Rasta (von Zenica)
- Education: University of Ljubljana
- Occupations: Musician; disc jockey; painter; mineralogist
- Musical career
- Genres: Rock; reggae; garage rock; dub; worldbeat; punk rock; afrobeat; jazz
- Instrument: Percussion

Albin Jarić (1953–2023), better known by his stage name Jimi Rasta, is a Bosnian–Slovenian musician, painter, and mineralogist.

== Career ==
Jarić is born in 1953 in Zenica, PR Bosnia and Herzegovina, FPR Yugoslavia. He started playing drums in his first year of high school when he won an audition for a school band. In 1976, he met Jamaican Brian and African Ken in a student settlement, both guitarists and singers with whom he founded reggae band Night Duty.

In Zenica, he finished high school and enrolled studies in metallurgy at the University of Zenica. After a year he continued his studies in Ljubljana at the Ljubljana Faculty of Natural Sciences and Engineering, Department of Mineralogy. Upon arrival in Ljubljana, Jarić devotes himself to the renovation of one basement in the Rožna Dolina student settlement, under the auspices of the student organization Forum. In a few years, this basement becomes the famous nightclub, Student Disco (later Disco FV, nowadays Club K-4). Jarić worked there as a disc jockey playing rock, reggae, dub, and worldbeat music.

The Institute of Metallurgy and Mining employed Jarić as a junior researcher until the breakup of Yugoslavia in 1991. In 1992, Jarić set up the band Planet People in Jamaica.

In 2001, Jarić joined the Bosnian garage rock band Zabranjeno Pušenje. He performed on their seventh studio album Bog vozi Mercedes (2001), as well as on a live album; Live in St. Louis (2004). As a percussionist, he performed on 350 concerts of Zabranjeno Pušenje. Jarić left the band in 2004 when he made a break from music career and became devoted to painting. As a percussionist, he has worked with a variety of bands, playing rock, punk, afrobeat, reggae, jazz, and all the way to Canadian country and the Balkan groove.

== Discography ==
Zabranjeno pušenje

- Bog vozi Mercedes (2001)
- Live in St. Louis (2004)
