= Predrag Bobić =

- Also known as: Dragan, Bleka
- Born: May 18, 1960 (age 65); Slavonski Brod, PR Croatia, FPR Yugoslavia
- Genres: rock; garage rock
- Occupations: Musician; music pedagogue
- Instrument: Bass guitar
- Years active: 1978–1991; 1995–2009

Predrag Bobić (born May 18, 1960), sometimes credited as Dragan Bobić and known by his nickname Bleka, is a Croatian musician, guitarist and music pedagogue. He is most notable as a former bassist of rock band Zabranjeno Pušenje.

== Music career ==
Bobić started his guitarist career in the late 1970s. His first band was Epitaf. During 1980s he performed with many local-known bands, such as Jesen, Band, No.1 and Brod and Animatori. In late 1980s he made a collaboration with Sarajevo-based rock band Zabranjeno Pušenje and appeared as guest bassist on their 1987 album Pozdrav iz zemlje Safari. After his stint with Animatori, he left his music career for a while.

In 1996, Bobić joined with Sejo Sexon and Elvis J. Kurtović in a refreshed lineup of Zabranjeno Pušenje after the band's dissolution in early 1990s. Bobić played on four studio albums; Fildžan viška (1997), Agent tajne sile (1999), Bog vozi Mercedes (2001) and Hodi da ti čiko nešto da (2006); and two live albums, Hapsi sve! (1998) and Live in St. Louis (2004). In September 2008, Bobić chose to leave Zabranjeno Pušenje after a farewell concert at the Zagreb's lake Bundek.

== Personal life ==
Bobić was born and raised in Slavonski Brod, FPR Yugoslavia (nowadays Croatia). In 1987, he moved to Zagreb. Bobić had two sons, Bojan (b. 1988) and Matko.

Bobić earned his bachelor's degree in a music pedagogy in 1987. He works as a music teacher in an elementary school in Zagreb.

== Discography ==
Zabranjeno pušenje

- Pozdrav iz zemlje Safari (1987) (Guest appearance)
- Fildžan viška (1997)
- Hapsi sve! (1998)
- Agent tajne sile (1999)
- Bog vozi Mercedes (2001)
- Live in St. Louis (2004)
- Hodi da ti čiko nešto da (2006)
