= Nadreality Show =

- Nadreality show's logo.
- Created by: Zenit Đozić
- Starring: Zenit Đozić; Elvis J. Kurtović; Milan Pavlović and others
- Country of origin: Bosnia and Herzegovina
- No. of episodes: 18

Production
- Production location: Bosnia and Herzegovina
- Running time: ~ 30-40 minutes

Original release
- Network: Federalna televizija
- Release: April 8, 2007 – 2017

Nadreality Show is a Bosnian TV show and reunion of some of the old crew from Top lista nadrealista, the late 80s and early 90s crew.

It's the 21st century continuation of Top lista nadrealista. RTL Televizija alongside Federalna televizija and B92 broadcast Nadreality Show from 2007 to 2008. The main person in the sketches was Zenit Đozić. It was one of the biggest hits of Federalna televizija and was greatly appreciated by the Bosnian & most of the ex-Yugoslav audience.

During 2017, Nadreality Show 2 aired as a continuation on the first season of the series.
