= TLN-Europa =

- Company type: Ltd.
- Industry: Music production Film production Video production
- Founded: November 24, 1995; 29 years ago in Zagreb, Croatia
- Founder: Davor Sučić
- Area served: Croatia
- Key people: Saša Midžor Sučić (CEO)

TLN-Europa, Ltd., is a Croatian independent record label and a film and video production company based in Zagreb. It's founded by Davor Sučić, better known as Sejo Sexon, a Bosnian rock and roll musician and a bandleader of Zabranjeno pušenje.

== Released albums ==
=== Zabranjeno pušenje ===
- Nikad robom, vazda taxijem (1996)
- Srce, ruke i lopata (1998)
- Agent tajne sile (1999)
- Male priče o velikoj ljubavi (1999, original release in 1989)
- Bog vozi Mercedes (2001)

=== Elvis J. Kurtović ===
- Sve najbolje od... - Hitovi '83-'88 (1996)
