= Indexi (award) =

Indexi is the Bosnian music award. It given by the Indexi Award Direction and Indexi Award Programme Committee.

The award was established in 2002 in Zenica by Josip Dujmović. The initial name of the award was Davorin, honouring one of the most famous Bosnian pop/rock singers Davorin Popović from Indexi. In 2008, the award was renamed Indexi, after Davorin's band.

In 2010, the Programme Committee consisted of several music critics, including Branimir Lokner and Zlatko Gall.

In 2011, there were 12 award categories:

- Awarded by a jury:
  - Rock & all album of the year
  - Rap & hip hop album
  - Pop album
  - Thematic & compilation albums
  - Grand Prix
- Awarded by the audience:
  - Rock & all album of the year
  - Rap & hip hop album
  - Pop album
  - Thematic & compilation albums
  - Grand Prix
