= Sarajevo Philharmonic Orchestra =

Orchestra in Sarajevo, Bosnia

- Official logo
- Founded: 1923; 102 years ago
- Location: Sarajevo, Bosnia and Herzegovina
- Concert hall: Sarajevo National Theatre
- Principal conductor: Samra Gulamović
- Website: saph.ba/en/

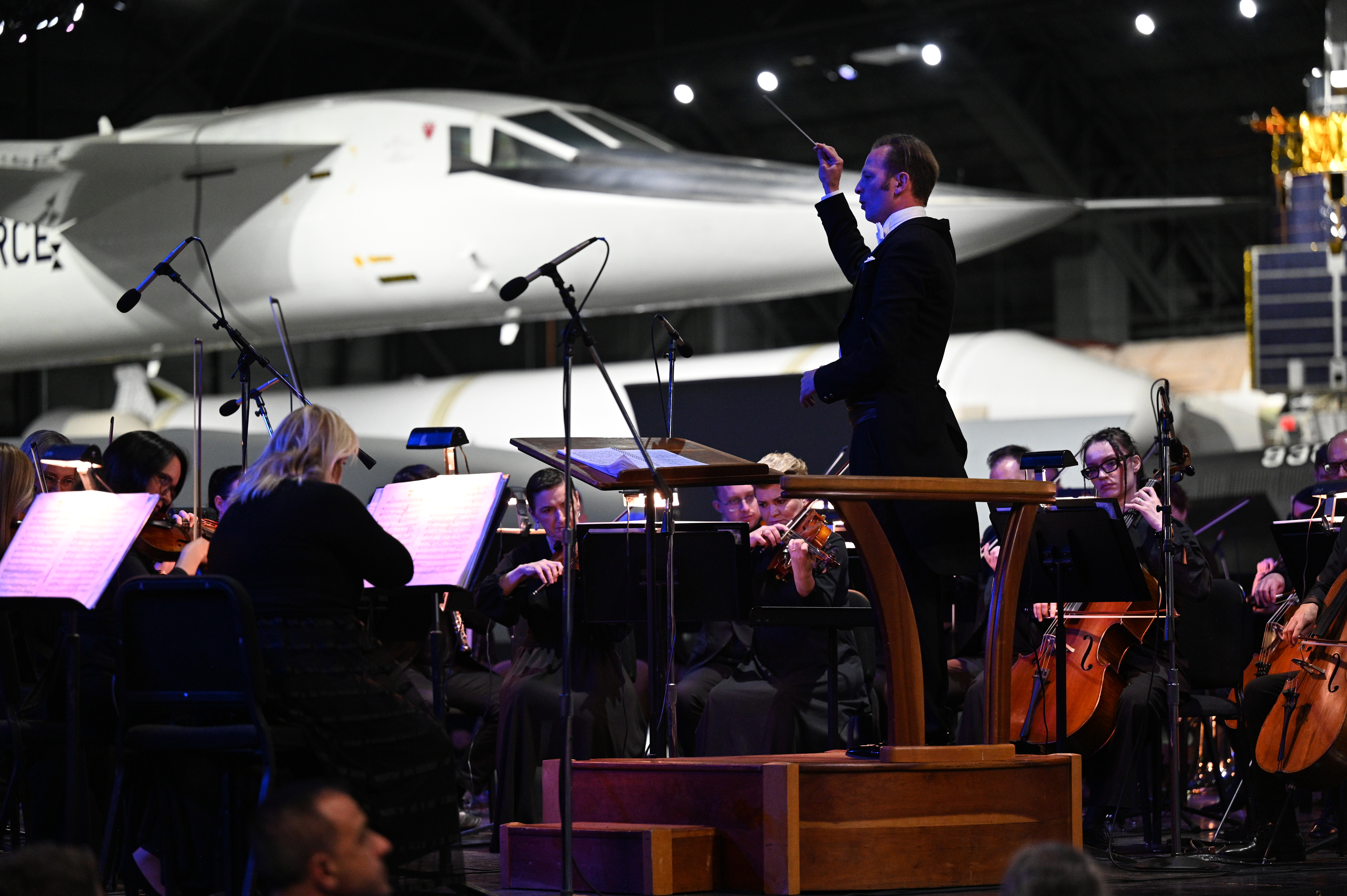
Sarajevo Philharmonic Orchestra performing at Wright-Patterson Air Force Base in 2025

The Sarajevo Philharmonic Orchestra (Bosnian, Croatian and Serbian: Sarajevska filharmonija / Сарајевска филхармонија) is an orchestra in Sarajevo.

Its first concert was performed on 24 October 1923, with the program being Lisinski's overture from the opera Porin; Mendelssohn's Piano Concerto No. 1; Beethoven's Second Symphony. The conductors were A. Lukinić and J. Rozdalovski.

The outbreak of World War II disrupted the activities of the orchestra, which was re-established in October 1948. During the Bosnian War, the orchestra again suffered disruption. During the Siege of Sarajevo, seven members of the Sarajevo Philharmonic Orchestra were killed and twelve were wounded. The archive of musical scores was damaged and many instruments were destroyed, damaged or lost. During the war, however, the Sarajevo Philharmonic Orchestra continued its work and performed 60 concerts, 20 of them abroad. The rehearsals were performed in hard winter conditions, in basements, and without heating and only by candlelight.

The Sarajevo Philharmonic Orchestra performed on 19 June 1994, amongst the ruins of Sarajevo City Hall. Mozart's Requiem was performed, and Zubin Mehta conducted the concert with soloists José Carreras, Ruggero Raimondi, Cecilia Gasdia and Ildikó Komlósi.

In September 1994, the Sarajevo Philharmonic Orchestra toured in Italy, and subsequently in Austria (1995, 1996), Turkey (1995), the Czech Republic (1995), France (1997), Switzerland (1997, 2000), and again in Italy (1995–1997).

The Sarajevo Philharmonic Orchestra visited and organized concerts in several cities in Bosnia and Herzegovina.

In October 1996, Yehudi Menuhin came to Sarajevo and conducted the Sarajevo Philharmonic Orchestra. In 1997, by the invitation of UNESCO's Director-General, Federico Mayor Zaragoza, the Sarajevo Philharmonic Orchestra went to Paris and performed a concert there.

In 1998 the Sarajevo Philharmonic Orchestra performed in Ravenna, and in 1999, in the United States and Netherlands; in the summers of 1998 and 1999, the orchestra collaborated with the music academy AIDIMOS and its director, German conductor Ernst Schelle, touring around all the main cities of Bosnia with conductors and additional musicians from amongst others, Albania, Austria, Croatia, France, Germany and the United Kingdom. In March 1997, the Sarajevo Philharmonic Orchestra recorded its first CD, 'Sarajevo Renaissance'.
