= Dado Džihan =

- Born: Jadranko Džihan; 1964 (age 61–62); Sarajevo, SR Bosnia-Herzegovina, SFR Yugoslavia
- Occupations: Composer, music producer
- Formerly of: Zabranjeno Pušenje

Jadranko "Dado" Džihan (1964), also credited as Dado Jehan, is a composer, music producer and sound master from Bosnia and Herzegovina. He is a member of New Primitives, Top lista nadrealista an art movement of Sarajevo of the early 1980s. From 1991, he has been based in London. He works as a composer. He is also the brother of Vlado Džihan, best known as one half of the Viennese downtempo electronica duo DZihan & Kamien.

1980-1984 in Sarajevo Dado and his friend Darko Ostojić "Ogi" aka Oggie the Kid, formed a rock band with a spiritual touch called Nirvana, later changed to Cyclone. Džihan played keyboards in one of the most successful bands in ex-Yugoslavia, Zabranjeno Pušenje – “No Smoking Orchestra” releasing a number of critically acclaimed albums. He was the lead vocalist in the band Kongres, and played keyboards in Valentino (band), Gino Banana, Hari Mata Hari and many others including the forward-thinking band "BITLISI" co-founded with another dear friend and a colleague from Top lista nadrealista Zlaja Ivanisevic.

In 1991, in the eve of the Bosnian War, Džihan moved to London, and continued to work in Music industry, Film and TV as a composer, music producer, pianist, sound artist and actor.

His compositional style blends European modern and classical works with ethnic elements from the Balkans, Middle East and Africa. He is a classically trained pianist, and also a sound designer and performer with more than 30 years of experience.

Some of his film credits include Angelina Jolie’s directorial debut In the Land of Blood and Honey (2011), Anthony Minghella’s Breaking and Entering, Well Tempered Corpses / Dobro Ustimani Mrtvaci by Benjamin Filipovic, and "Sitting Ducks" by Gerald Fox.
