= Mustafa Čengić =

Bosnian record producer

- Born: Sarajevo, SR Bosnia and Herzegovina, SFR Yugoslavia
- Other names: MuČe; Mujo Snažni; Speed Mustafson; Major Mustaphson
- Occupations: Musician; producer; sound engineer; music pedagogue
- Years active: 1976–present
- Musical career
- Genres: New Primitivism; Rock; Garage rock
- Instruments: Lead guitar; rhythm guitar; acoustic guitar; vocals
- Labels: Jugoton; Diskoton

Mustafa Čengić, known by his nickname MuČe, is a Bosnian record producer, sound engineer, music pedagogue, and guitarist. He first found mainstream success as an original lineup member of a Bosnian garage rock band Zabranjeno Pušenje and by his stage name at the time Mujo Snažni (transl. Mujo the Strong).

== Career ==
In 1976, Čengić was a founding member and guitarist of a Sarajevo-based hard rock band Prvi čin (transl. The First Act). In the next year, the band was disbanded with no album released.

Čengić joined a Sarajevo-based garage rock band Zabranjeno Pušenje in fall 1980. As a lead guitarist, he performed on the band's first two studio albums: Das ist Walter (1984) and Dok čekaš sabah sa šejtanom (1985). In 1986, he left the band with some other members.

At twenty-seven, Čengić left his career as a guitarist to devote himself to the study of sound engineering and became a record producer. During the late 1980s, he produced records of several Sarajevo-based bands and musicians, such as LaBanda, Bombarder, Major, Elvis J. Kurtović & His Meteors, and Milić Vukašinović. In 1990, he co-founded the Rasa Music Production, an independent record label that survived the siege of the city thanks to its anti-war efforts. At the same time, Čengić became a music producer on the Bosnia and Herzegovina Television and organized several light music festivals.

Čengić moved to Italy in the mid-1990s. As the creator of the Rock sotto l'assedio (transl. Rock Under the Siege) project he had a concert at San Siro in Milan in August 1995 led by Vasco Rossi. At the time in Italy he worked as a freelancer for various musical and theatrical groups, including the Teatro Comunale di Bologna. Also, he created a recording studio at the Container Club in Bologna where he recorded, mixed and produced for several groups including Opa Cupa, The Childbirth of Heavy Clouds, Amarcord, Bernstein School Of Musical Theater, World Youth Chamber Orchestra, Oblivion.

In recent years, Čengić carries out a pedagogical activity, devoting himself to training both in the music industry and in sound engineering.

Čengić has been living in Bologna, Italy, since the mid-1990s.

== Discography ==
Zabranjeno pušenje

- Das ist Walter (1984)
- Dok čekaš sabah sa šejtanom (1985)

Major

- Son Late Zigi Daj (1989)
