= Letu štuke =

Bosnian rock group

Letu štuke (transl. Pike Flight) is a rock band from Bosnia and Herzegovina formed in 1986 in Sarajevo. They published a number of studio albums and gained mainstream popularity in the country with the songs "Minimalizam", "Mjesto za dvoje", "Tesla", and others.

== Name ==
The band's name is a reference to a phrase from the movie Kozara.

== Awards ==
- 2006 - Nominated for 7 Davorin awards and won 3, for their first album, in the urban rock/club album, urban song "Minimalizam" and rock urban club artist of the year.
- 2018 - Won the yearly Kemal Monteno Award for pop music awarded by the Association of Authors and Musical Composers (AMUS).
- 2020 - Nominated in the Pop rock song category at MAC 2020.

== Albums ==
- Letu štuke (2005)
- Proteini i ugljikohidrati (2008)
- Brojevi računa (2011)
- Best of (2017)
- Topla voda (2018)
