= Bog vozi Mercedes =

2001 album by Zabranjeno Pušenje

Studio album by Zabranjeno Pušenje
- Released: December 2001
- Recorded: March–June 2001
- Studio: Mobile Unit Studio, Bjelolasica, Croatia; Fast Food Audio Studio, Ivanić Grad, Croatia
- Genre: Garage rock; pop rock
- Length: 57:31
- Language: Bosnian
- Label: Menart; TLN-Europa; Active Time
- Producer: Sejo Sexon; Dragomir Herendić

Zabranjeno Pušenje chronology
Agent tajne sile (1999)	Bog vozi Mercedes (2001)	Live in St. Louis (2004)

Singles from Bog vozi Mercedes
- 1. "Splitska princeza" 2. "Arizona Dream"; 3. "Počasna salva" 4. "Lijepa Alma"; 5. "Karabaja" Released: 2003; 6. "Bog vozi Mercedes" Released: 2004

Bog vozi Mercedes (transl. God drives a Mercedes) is the seventh studio album by Bosnian rock band Zabranjeno Pušenje, released in December 2001. It was released through Menart Records and TLN-Europa in Croatia and Active Time in Yugoslavia.

== Track listing ==
Source: Discogs

No.	Title	Writer(s)	Arranger(s)	Length
1.	"Tigar iz Kladnja" (A Tiger from Kladanj)	Davor Sučić; Ryuichi Sakamoto	Sučić	4:59
2.	"Karabaja" (The Ghost of the Past)	Sučić	Sučić; Dragomir Herendić; Bruno Urlić	4:32
3.	"Dino"	Sučić	Sučić	4:07
4.	"Lijepa Alma" (Beautiful Alma)	Sučić	Herendić; Urlić	3:59
5.	"Bog vozi Mercedes" (God drives a Mercedes)	Sučić	Sučić; Herendić	4:41
6.	"Genter" (A ladykiller in Police)	Sučić; Bruce Springsteen		5:58
7.	"Arizona Dream"	Sučić	Sučić; Herendić; Urlić	4:47
8.	"Raja iz škole" (School Friends)	Sučić	Sučić; Herendić	3:48
9.	"Idol" (A Role Model)	Sučić; Mirko Srdić	Sučić; Urlić	3:35
10.	"Počasna salva" (Honorary salute)	Sučić; Status Quo; Izet Sarajlić	Sučić; Herendić; Urlić	5:14
11.	"Šareno kamenje" (Colorful Stones)	Sučić	Sučić; Urlić	4:00
Total length:				49:40

Bonus tracks
No.	Title	Writer(s)	Arranger(s)	Length
12.	"Splitska princeza - Intro" (A Princess of Split - Intro)	Sučić	Sučić	0:40
13.	"Splitska princeza" (A Princess of Split)	Sučić; Srđan Velimirović	Sučić; Herendić	4:04
Total length:				54:24

Bonus track – MP3 download only
No.	Title	Writer(s)	Arranger(s)	Length
14.	"Haag"	Sučić	Sučić	3:07
Total length:				57:31

Samples

- The album contains samples of the choir of "Gazi Husref-begova medresa" and Hafiz Abdurahman Sulejman.

== Personnel ==
Credits adapted from the album's liner notes.

Zabranjeno Pušenje

- Sejo Sexon – lead vocals, acoustic guitar
- Dragomir Herendić – acoustic guitar, electric guitar, accordion, keyboards, tambura
- Bruno Urlić Prco – violin, viola, keyboards, backing vocals
- Branko Trajkov Trak – drums, percussion, backing vocals
- Predrag Bobić Bleka – bass
- Albin Jarić (credited as Jimi Rasta von Zenica) – percussion

Additional musicians

- Zdenka Kovačiček – vocals (track 5)
- Ivanka Mazurkijević – vocals (waitress role) (track 7)
- Ibrica Jusić – vocals (track 11)
- Comdr. Žarko Radić Jastreb – reciting (track 10)
- Vanja Alić – backing vocals (track 9)
- Zoran Moro – vocals (reporter role) (track 3)
- Mirjana Holček – backing vocals (track 9)
- Trajko Simonovski Taci – fretless guitar (tracks 1, 6, 8)
- Mihail Parušev Miško – drums (tracks 8, 14)
- Marijan Jukić – soprano saxophone, saxophone
- Tomica Rukljić – trumpet
- Šogi – accordion (track 5)

Production

- Sejo Sexon – production
- Dragomir Herendić Dragianni – production, sound engineering, programming, audio mixing, looping
- Dario Vitez – executive production
- Josip Kepe – sound engineering
- Zoran Švigir Švigi – mastering (Studio Šišmiš in Velika Gorica, Croatia)
- Dražen Marković – recording assistant

Design

- Dario Vitez – design
- Srđan Velimirović – design
- Saša Midžor – photos
