= Agent tajne sile =

Studio album by Zabranjeno Pušenje
- Released: June 1999
- Recorded: March 1999
- Studio: Rent-A-Cow Studio in Amsterdam, the Netherlands
- Genre: Garage rock
- Length: 42:38
- Language: Bosnian
- Label: Dancing Bear; TLN-Europa; RENOME; Nimfa Sound; Active Time
- Producer: Sejo Sexon; Zlaja Hadžić

Zabranjeno Pušenje chronology
Hapsi sve! (1998)	Agent tajne sile (1999)	Bog vozi Mercedes (2001)

Singles from Agent tajne sile
- 1. "Pos'o, kuća, birtija" 2. "Agent tajne sile" 3. "Jugo 45"; 4. "Pupoljak"

Agent tajne sile (transl. A Secret Force Agent) is the sixth studio album by Bosnian rock band Zabranjeno Pušenje, released in June 1999. It was released through Dancing Bear and TLN-Europa in Croatia, RENOME and Nimfa Sound in Bosnia and Herzegovina, and Active Time in Yugoslavia.

== Track listing ==
Source: Discogs

No.	Title	Writer(s)	Arranger(s)	Length
1.	"Pismo" (A Letter)	Davor Sučić	Sučić	3:15
2.	"Sa Čičkom na Stonese" (With Čičak to the Stones Show)	Sučić; Mirko Srdić	Sučić	3:23
3.	"Agent tajne sile" (A Secret Force Agent)	Sučić	Sučić	3:26
4.	"Tragovi suza" (Traces of Tears)	Sučić; Srdić; Dino Šaran	Sučić	3:57
5.	"Vještica" (A Witch)	Sučić; Srdić	Sučić	3:07
6.	"Izvini jaro, guzim" (Sorry Bud, I'm Fucking in Doggy)	Sučić	Sučić	2:15
7.	"Penzioneri" (Pensioners)	Sučić; Srdić	Sučić	2:15
8.	"Mali Cviko" (Lil' Cviko)	Sučić	Sučić	3:00
9.	"Jugo 45" (Yugo 45)	Sučić	Sučić	4:59
10.	"Dr. Džemidžić"	Sučić	Sučić	3:07
11.	"Pos'o, kuća, birtija" (Work, Home, a Bar)	Sučić; Srdić	Sučić	4:28
12.	"Pupoljak" (A Bud)	Srdić	Srdić	5:26
Total length:				42:38

== Personnel ==
Credits adapted from the album's liner notes.

Zabranjeno Pušenje

- Sejo Sexon – lead vocals, guitar, backing vocals
- Elvis J. Kurtovich – vocals, backing vocals
- Marin Gradac Mako – trombone, vocals, backing vocals
- Predrag Bobić Bleka – bass
- Kristina Biluš – vocals, backing vocals
- Bruno Urlić Prco – violin, viola, keyboards, backing vocals
- Branko Trajkov Trak – drums, percussion, backing vocals
- Sejo Kovo – lead guitar, rhythm guitar

Additional musicians

- Cena von Vinkovci – accordion (track 2)
- Vlado Morrison – vocals (track 2)

Production

- Sejo Sexon – production
- Zlaja Hadžić Jeff – production, sound engineering
- Dario Vitez – executive production
- Branko Trajkov Trak – assistant

Design

- Dario Vitez – design
- Sejo Sexon – design
- Haris Memija – photos
