= Male priče o velikoj ljubavi =

Studio album by Zabranjeno Pušenje
- Released: Summer 1989
- Studio: RTV Sarajevo Studio 1, Sarajevo, Yugoslavia
- Genre: Garage rock
- Length: 41:45
- Language: Serbo-Croatian
- Label: Diskoton
- Producer: Sejo Sexon

Zabranjeno Pušenje chronology
Pozdrav iz zemlje Safari (1987)	Male priče o velikoj ljubavi (1989)	Nikad robom, vazda taxijem (1996)

Male priče o velikoj ljubavi (transl. The Little Stories About a Great Love) is the fourth studio album by Yugoslav rock band Zabranjeno Pušenje released in 1989. It was released through Diskoton in SFR Yugoslavia. This was the last album before splitting up of the band in early 1990.

The album was re-released in 1999 through TLN-Europa.

== Track listing ==
Side A
No.	Title	Writer(s)	Arranger(s)	Length
1.	"Guzonjin sin"	Davor Sučić	Sučić	4:06
2.	"Javi mi"	Sučić; Lou Reed	Sučić	3:46
3.	"Piccola Storia de Grande Amore"	Nenad Janković; Sučić	Dado Džihan; Sučić	5:01
4.	"Pišonja i Žuga u paklu droge"	Sučić	Sučić	5:14
5.	"Pklatovi (I dio)"	Sučić; Janković	Sučić	5:23

Side B
No.	Title	Writer(s)	Arranger(s)	Length
1.	"Pklatovi (II dio)"	Sučić	Sučić	3:16
2.	"Kanjon Drine"	Sučić; Janković	Sučić	1:58
3.	"12 sati"	Sučić	Sučić	3:54
4.	"Straža pored Prizrena"	Sučić	Sučić	4:02
5.	"Zvijezda nad Balkanom"	Sučić	Sučić	4:13

== Personnel ==
Credits adapted from the album's liner notes.

Zabranjeno pušenje

- Nele Karajlić – lead vocals
- Sejo Sexon – rhythm guitar, backing vocals
- Predrag Kovačević Kova – lead guitar
- Dado Džihan – keyboards, backing vocals
- Darko Ostojić Minka – bass, backing vocals
- Faris Arapović – drums

Additional musicians

- Tamara Štrelof – vocals (track A3)
- Željko Babić – accordion
- Benjamin Isović – backing vocals
- Goran Petranović (credited as Rizo Kurtović) – backing vocals
- Srđan Velimirović – backing vocals
- Darko Poljak – saxophone
- Dejan Sparavalo – violin
- Muhamed Adaš – violin

Production

- Sejo Sexon – production
- Predrag Kovačević Kova – supervisor
- Mufid Kosović – recording (RTV Sarajevo Studio 1 in Sarajevo, YUG)
- Kiki Zurovac – manager

Design

- Srđan Velimirović – design
- Dragoslav Popović – photos
- Srđan Badrov – photos
