= Fildžan viška =

Studio album by Zabranjeno Pušenje
- Released: 1997
- Recorded: December 1996
- Studio: Rent-A-Cow Studio, Amsterdam, the Netherlands
- Genre: Garage rock; new primitivism
- Length: 56:08
- Language: Bosnian
- Label: Dallas Records; Nimfa Sound
- Producer: Sejo Sexon; Zlaja Hadžić; Denis Mujadžić

Zabranjeno Pušenje chronology
| Nikad robom, vazda taxijem (1996) | Fildžan viška (1997) | Srce, ruke i lopata (1998) |

Singles from Fildžan viška
- 1. "Možeš imat' moje tijelo" 2. "Mile Hašišar"; 3. "Pubertet"; 4. "Fildžan viška"

Fildžan viška (transl. A Cup to Spare) is the fifth studio album by Bosnian rock band Zabranjeno Pušenje, released in 1997. It was released through Dallas Records in Croatia and Slovenia, and Nimfa Sound in Bosnia and Herzegovina.

It's the first album where Sejo Sexon took over the role of the lead singer in the band.

== Promotion ==
Immediately following the release of Fildžan viška, the band embarked on a tour to support the record. The band realized 149 concerts for promotion of the album.

== Track listing ==
Source: Discogs

| No. | Title | Writer(s) | Arranger(s) | Length |
|---|---|---|---|---|
| 1. | "Halid umjesto Halida" (Halid In Place of Halid) | Davor Sučić | Sučić | 5:23 |
| 2. | "Pubertet" (Puberty) | Sučić; Mirko Srdić | Jurica Paunović | 4:25 |
| 3. | "Mile Hašišar" (Mile the Pothead) | Sučić | Sučić | 3:55 |
| 4. | "Možeš imat' moje tijelo" (You Can Have My Body) | Sučić; Srdić | Sučić | 4:51 |
| 5. | "Fildžan viška" (A Cup to Spare) | Sučić; Bruce Springsteen | | 4:25 |
| 6. | "Pismo Elvisu" (A Letter to Elvis) | Sučić | Sučić | 2:15 |
| 7. | "Oprosti mi, pape" (Forgive me, Papa) | Sučić; Zdenko Runjić | Sučić | 6:21 |
| 8. | "Test za dženet" (A Test for Heaven) | Sučić | Sučić | 4:03 |
| 9. | "Hajle Selasije" (Haile Selassie) | Sučić; Srdić | Sučić | 3:56 |
| 10. | "Balada o Gigi Bosniću" (The Ballad of Giga Bosnić) | Sučić | Sučić | 4:58 |
| 11. | "Kad dernek utihne" (When the Party's Over) | Sučić | Sučić | 4:10 |
| 12. | "Otpor, Stoko!" (Resist, Scum! ) | Sučić | Sučić | 3:29 |
| Total length: | | | | 56:08 |

== Personnel ==
Credits adapted from the album's liner notes.

Zabranjeno Pušenje

- Sejo Sexon – lead vocals, guitar, backing vocals
- Samir Ćeremida – bass
- Đani Pervan – drums, backing vocals
- Elvis J. Kurtović – vocals, backing vocals
- Marin Gradac Mako – trombone, vocals, backing vocals
- Sejo Kovo – lead guitar, rhythm guitar
- Dušan Vranić Duco – keyboards, backing vocals

Production

- Sejo Sexon – co–production, audio mixing
- Zlaja Hadžić Jeff – co–production, recording, mastering, audio mixing (Rent-A-Cow Studio in Amsterdam, the Netherlands)
- Denis Mujadžić Denyken – production, audio mixing
- Maarten de Boer – sound engineering, mastering (The Masters in Bontebok, The Netherlands)
- Aco Razbornik – audio mixing (Studio Tivoli in Ljubljana, Slovenia)
- Predrag Bobić Bleka – executive production
- Elvis J. Kurtović – executive production

Design

- Albino Uršić Bino – design
- Boris Kuk Boro – design
- Mio Vesović – photos
- Darije Petković – photos
- Boris Berc – photos
