= Pozdrav iz zemlje Safari =

Studio album by Zabranjeno Pušenje
- Released: 1987
- Recorded: January – February 1987
- Studios: RTV Sarajevo Studio 1, Sarajevo, Yugoslavia
- Genre: Garage rock
- Length: 39:56
- Language: Serbo-Croatian
- Label: Diskoton
- Producer: Sven Rustempašić

Zabranjeno Pušenje chronology
Dok čekaš sabah sa šejtanom (1985)	Pozdrav iz zemlje Safari (1987)	Male priče o velikoj ljubavi (1989)

Pozdrav iz zemlje Safari (transl. Greetings from the Land of Safari) is the third studio album by Yugoslav band Zabranjeno Pušenje released in 1987. It was released through Diskoton in SFR Yugoslavia.

== Legacy ==
=== Screenplay ===
In 2006, Vladimir Đurđević, a first-year dramaturgy student at the University of Arts' Faculty of Dramatic Arts (FDU), wrote a script based on the "Balada o Pišonji i Žugi" track as part of a school assignment. Though mostly relying on "Balada o Pišonji i Žugi", the script also references other Zabranjeno pušenje songs such as "Pamtim to kao da je bilo danas", "Lutka sa naslovne strane", "Hadžija il bos", "Murga drot", "Guzonjin sin", and "Pišonja i Žuga u paklu droge". Đurđević placed the plot in summer 1990 on the eve of the Yugoslavia vs. West Germany match at the 1990 FIFA World Cup with two lifelong friends from Sarajevo of differing ethno-religious backgrounds and football club loyalties (Pišonja, a Bosniak who's a fan of FK Sarajevo, and Žuga, a Serb pulling for FK Željezničar) trying to get to Dubrovnik.

=== Theater staging ===
Đurđević's script got staged under Slađana Kilibarda's direction, premiering on 20 November 2010 as Zbogom žohari at Toša Jovanović Theater in Zrenjanin. Kilibarda decided to make a few modifications to Đurđević's script, such as placing the plot a year later in summer 1991, the start of Yugoslav Wars.

On 11 March 2012, another theatrical staging premiered at Belgrade's Atelje 212, directed by Vladan Đurković as Balada o Pišonji i Žugi with Milan Marić playing the role of Pišonja, Nikola Jovanović as Žuga, Tamara Dragičević as Amila, Ivan Zekić as Guzonjin sin, and Zoran Cvijanović as Murga Drot. In addition to Atelje 212, the play is also performed at Dadov Youth Theater.

== Track listing ==
Source: Discogs

Side A (Forhand)
No.	Title	Writer(s)	Arranger(s)	Length
1.	"Hadžija ili bos"	Davor Sučić; Nenad Janković	Sučić	4:13
2.	"(Kako je Velika Britanija postala) probušeni dolar"	Sučić; Janković; Emir Kusturica	Sučić; Janković; Kusturica	4:08
3.	"Murga Drot"	Sučić; Janković	Sučić; Janković	4:05
4.	"Dobri jarani"	Sučić; John Lennon	Sučić	3:22
5.	"Dan republike"	Sučić; Janković	Sučić	3:43

Side B (Backhand)
No.	Title	Writer(s)	Arranger(s)	Length
1.	"Balada o Pišonji i Žugi"	Sučić; Janković	Sučić; Janković	5:29
2.	"Manijak"	Sučić	Sučić; Janković	3:07
3.	"Posljednja oaza (u lošoj formi sam)"	Sučić	Sučić	3:32
4.	"Srce, ruke i lopata"	Sučić; Janković	Sučić	4:34
5.	"Meteor"	Goran Grbić; Sučić; Janković	Grbić; Sučić; Janković	3:56

== Personnel ==
Credits adapted from the album's liner notes.

Zabranjeno pušenje

- Seid Karajlić – keyboards, backing vocals
- Ognjen Gajić – saxophone, flute
- Sejo Sexon – rhythm guitar
- Kowalski – lead guitar
- Dado Džihan – keyboards, backing vocals
- Oggie – bass, backing vocals
- Emir Kusturica – bass
- Faris Arapović – drums
- Nele Karajlić – lead vocals

Additional musicians

- Dragan Bobić – bass, backing vocals
- Vlado Džihan – piano, trombone
- Goran Petranović (credited as Rizo Kurtović) – backing vocals
- Ljilja Košpić – backing vocals
- Goran Grbić – brass section
- Milivoje Marković – brass section
- Tihomir Jakšić – brass section
- Vladimir Krnetić – brass section
- Željko Nestorov – brass section

Production

- Sven Rustempašić – production
- Toby Alington – sound engineering (Olympic Studio in London, UK)
- Rajko Bartula – recording
- Goran Micić – recording assistant
- Miro Purivatra – executive production

Design

- Zenit Đozić – design
- Kemal Hadžić – photos
