= Zabranjeno Pušenje =

Bosnian rock band

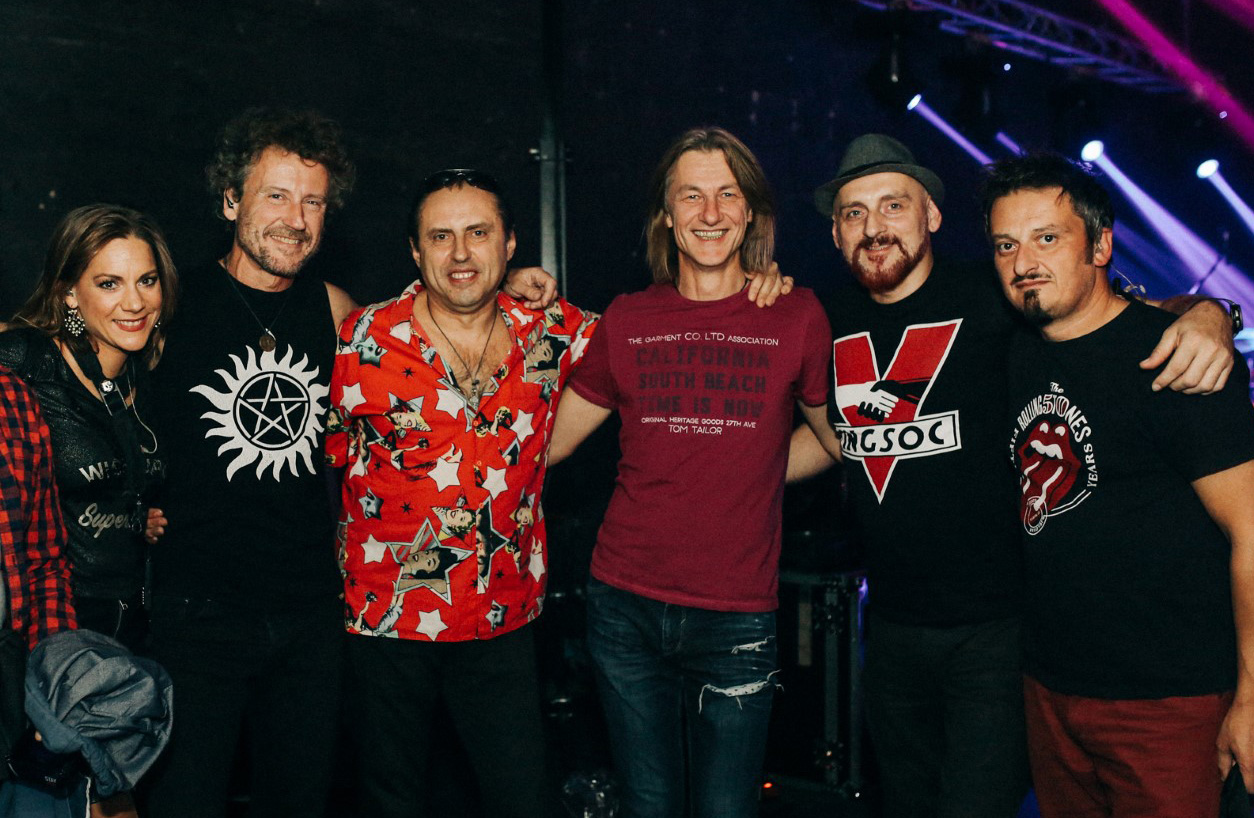
- Band in 2017

Background information
- Origin: Sarajevo, SR Bosnia and Herzegovina, SFR Yugoslavia
- Genres: rock; punk rock; garage rock; rock and roll
- Years active: 1980–1990; 1996–present
- Labels: Jugoton; Diskoton; Dallas Records; Nimfa Sound; Dancing Bear; Renome; Active Time; TLN-Europa; Menart; Civitas; Mascom; Hayat Production; Long Play; Tropik; Croatia Records
- Spinoffs: Elvis J. Kurtović & His Meteors; The No Smoking Orchestra; Shaderwan Code
- Members: Davor Sučić; Branko Trajkov; Robert Boldižar; Toni Lović; Dejan Orešković; Anđela Zebec; Tomislav Goluban
- Past members: See members
- Website: Official website

Zabranjeno Pušenje (transl. No Smoking) is a Bosnian rock band formed in Sarajevo in 1980. The group's musical style primarily consists of a distinctive garage rock sound with folk influences, often featuring innovative production and complex storytelling. The band currently consists of seven members: co-founder, vocalist, and guitarist Davor Sučić; longtime drummer Branko Trajkov, guitarist Toni Lović, bass guitarist Dejan Orešković, violinist and keyboardist Robert Boldižar, backing vocalist Anđela Zebec, and harmonica player Tomislav Goluban.

The band was formed contrary to the then prevalent Yugoslav punk rock and new wave, closely associated with the New Primitivism cultural movement and the radio and television satire and sketch comedy show Top lista nadrealista. They were one of the most popular musical acts of the 1980s in Yugoslavia, selling hundreds of thousands of records. Many times they got in trouble with the authorities for their, usually mild and sympathetic, criticism of the socialist system, and the habit of making light of issues considered sensitive at the time. The band's first lineup, originally named Pseudobluz bend Zabranjeno Pušenje, featured guitarist Sejo Sexon and vocalist Nele Karajlić, alongside drummers Fu-Do then Šeki Gayton, bassist Munja Mitić, keyboardist Seid Mali Karajlić, saxophonist and flutist Ognjen Gajić, guitarist Mustafa Čengić, and synthesizerist Zoran Degan. Their debut studio album Das ist Walter (1984) was initially released in limited circulation; the final count was 100,000 copies sold, setting a record for exceeding the initial release by 30 times. Their subsequent album Dok čekaš sabah sa šejtanom (1985), also released through Jugoton, was boycotted by the mainstream media due to troubles with Communist authorities. In 1986, Šeki Gayton, Mitić and Čengić chose to leave the group, while drummer Faris Arapović, bassist Darko Ostojić, guitarist Kowalski and keyboardist Dado Džihan joined in. During the second half of 1980s with the new lineup of the band released two albums Pozdrav iz zemlje Safari (1987) and Male priče o velikoj ljubavi (1989) through Diskoton.

In 1992, the band split in the wake of the Bosnian War. Nele Karajlić continued working in Belgrade under the names Nele Karajlić & Zabranjeno Pušenje and Emir Kusturica & The No Smoking Orchestra, while Sejo Sexon and other members rejoined in Sarajevo, using the original name and continuing the band's career. They released the fifth studio album Fildžan viška (1997) with the changed lineup. The band's 1990s lineup alongside Sejo Sexon featured the leader of the New Primitivism movement Elvis J. Kurtović, vocalist Marin Gradac, a guest on the 1987 album bassist Dragan Bobić, guitarist Sejo Kovo and violinist Bruno Urlić. After one temporary drummer, Branko Trajkov joined the group in 1996. The same lineup recorded the album Agent tajne sile (1999). In 2000, Kurtović, Kovo, and Gradac left the group, while guitarist and producer Dragianni joined the group and played on their subsequent album, Bog vozi Mercedes (2001). That album was followed five years later by Hodi da ti čiko nešto da (2006). In the mid-2000s, Dragianni, Bobić, and Urlić chose to leave the group, while guitarist Toni Lović, bassist Dejan Orešković, and violinist Robert Boldižar came to their seats. The band's ninth studio album, Muzej revolucije (2009), was released on the Anniversary of the October Revolution in almost all former Yugoslav countries, on the same day. The band released their tenth studio album, Radovi na cesti, in 2013. Their eleventh studio album was released in 2018, titled Šok i nevjerica. The twelfth and another double studio album Karamba! was released in 2022.

== History ==
=== Background ===
What would eventually become Zabranjeno Pušenje was started in 1979 by sixteen-year-old Nenad Janković (later to become known as dr. Nele Karajlić) and eighteen-year-old Davor Sučić (later Mr. Sejo Sexon), two teenage friends and neighbors who had been attending Sarajevo Second Gymnasium secondary school while residing in the same apartment building on Fuad Midžić Street in the Sarajevo neighborhood of Koševo. Already infatuated with and deeply immersed in rock and roll, the two fanatically absorbed various musical influences from Yugoslavia and abroad, all the while desperately trying to achieve a basic level of technical proficiency on their instruments—at this stage, Nele Karajlić played the piano, an instrument he had previously studied in music school for a short time before dropping out, while Sejo Sexon played the guitar. Both possessing very limited musical knowledge, despite displaying boundless enthusiasm, the duo struggled with everything from simply tuning their instruments to producing the simplest of melodies.

Sexon and Karajlić soon expanded their setup by adding Ognjen Gajić, another neighborhood teenage friend who possessed some basic musical knowledge having attended a music school. Though by Karajlić's own admission, Gajić played the piano better than him, Gajić decided to switch over to flute as an homage to his favorite band Jethro Tull. He managed to become comfortable on a new instrument fairly quickly, soon becoming a bit of a musical authority among this now three-piece.

Since each of the three teenage members of the group (by now informally known as Pseudobluz bend) lived with their parents, the band rehearsals also took place in their parents' apartments, mostly Karajlić's and Gajić's.

Before long, Sexon brought in Zenit Đozić (a.k.a. Zena, later to become known as Fu-Do), his new classmate at Second Gymnasium who had recently moved to Sarajevo from Bugojno, to be the band's drummer. Adding percussions, that actually consisted of pots and pans, to their setup created new problems as the noise during rehearsals became unbearable for Karajlić's parents and Gajić's mother so the members set about looking for a suitable rehearsal space.

=== 1980–1983: Early years ===
In fall 1980, in accordance with the newly passed Yugoslav law requiring high school graduates to immediately report for their compulsory military service in the Yugoslav People's Army, nineteen-year-old Sexon left Sarajevo and was away from the band for a whole year. With Sexon temporarily gone, the band got a new member – Mustafa Čengić (a.k.a. MuČe or Mujo Snažni) who, in turn, brought in Mladen Mitić (a.k.a. Munja or Mitke) on bass guitar. They were occasionally accompanied by Mirko Srdić (later to become known as Elvis J. Kurtović), Zoran Degan, Boris Šiber, Samir Ćeremida, etc. In December 1980, MuČe and Munja managed to get the band on the bill of a Želimir Altarac Čičak-organized new music showcase at Sarajevo's Dom mladih, held under the "Nove nade, nove snage" ('New Blood, New Hopefuls') mantra. The event would be the band's first-ever live public performance though they did play a small show at Sarajevo's Fifth Gymnasium for their social circle a few days earlier on 30 November 1980 as preparation for the Dom mladih gig. Shortly before Čičak's show at Dom mladih, the band changed its name to Pseudobluz bend Zabranjeno Pušenje. Over time, they dropped the first part and continued as just Zabranjeno Pušenje for brevity.

Their first recording, song "Penzioneri na more idu zimi" (transl. Retirees Take Their Seaside Vacation in Wintertime), was made for Radio Sarajevo in early 1981. Additionally, from May 1981, Karajlić and occasionally a few other band members became involved with the Top lista nadrealista radio segment, which aired weekly as part of the Primus program on Radio Sarajevo's channel two. "Penzioneri na more idu zimi" began getting some modest airplay on Radio Sarajevo throughout the year, leading to an increasing number of youths in the city making the connection between the band and the weekly comedy radio segment. In early fall 1981, along with a number of upstart Sarajevo bands such as Zov, Formula 4, Ema, COD, Rezonansa, Super 98, Negra, Žaoka, Ozbiljno Pitanje, Linija Života, Lucifer, Tečni Kristal, Tina, and Bedž, Zabranjeno Pušenje were booked for a multi-act gig as opening acts for headliners Indexi, Bulevar, Paraf, Zana, Aerodrom, Laboratorija Zvuka, and Bijelo Dugme – all part of the 'Mladost Sutjeske' event commemorating and celebrating the Battle of Sutjeska from World War II. Held at Skenderija sports arena on 3 October 1981, it was the band's biggest show to date and the youngsters left a memorable impression as singer Karajlić and drummer Đozić were about to leave for their mandatory army services just as guitarist Sexon was completing his.

=== 1984–1989: Breakthrough and rising fame in Yugoslavia ===
The band performed around Sarajevo for two years before beginning to record material for a debut album during Fall 1983 in producer a modest studio owned by "Paša" Ferović. The shambolic recording process took seven months before the album named Das ist Walter got released by Jugoton in April 1984 in the small print of 3,000 copies, clearly indicative of the label's extremely low commercial expectations. The line-up was altered and now Nenad Janković's younger brother keyboardist Dražen Janković (a.k.a. Seid Mali Karajlić) and drummer Predrag Rakić (a.k.a. Šeki Gayton). Though the album was initially released in the small print, the final count was 100,000 copies sold, setting a record for exceeding the initial release by 30 times. In Autumn 1984, they embarked on a 60-concert nationwide concert tour, making them one of the biggest Yugoslav rock attractions after just one album.

During that tour, at their concert in Rijeka on November 27, 1984, Nele Karajlić declared, referring to an amplifier that had just broken down, "Crk'o Maršal. Mislim na pojačalo." (transl. The Marshall croaked. I mean, the amplifier.), which was recognized as a pun on Marshal Tito's death, landing the band in trouble. They were criticized by the media and a campaign against them resulted in the canceling of their concerts and the removal of Top lista nadrealista from the air. The affair got attention of the Yugoslav Security Administration (UDBA), as well. They were rescued by some leading liberal intellectuals, and magazines such as Polet, Mladina and Slobodna Dalmacija, who raise their voices in the defense of the group members and that affair snaps without prison sentences. Later, Sexon said that their amplifiers weren't even Marshall, and that it was a joke.

In this atmosphere, the band recorded their second, double album Dok čekaš sabah sa šejtanom (transl. While waiting for the dawn with Satan) in the infamous SIM studio and released it in July 1985. The album has received widespread acclaim from critics, but was boycotted by the media. Following promotional tour had extreme difficulties due to concern of the concert hosts and the enormous presence of the state police, as a reflection of the Marshall Affair. Despite several top concerts such as at Pionir Hall in Belgrade, Poljud in Split or Dom Sportova in Zagreb, tens of thousands sold tickets, the tour had a rather disappointing conclusion as the following year Šeki Gayton and Mustafa Čengić left the band in search of a more secure means of making a living. Mladen Mitić left in late 1986 after contributing to the development of the third album.

The rest of the band was working on a subsequent album and slowly assembled a new band lineup, featured drummer Faris Arapović and guitarist Predrag Kovačević (a.k.a. Kova or Kowalski) and bassist Emir Kusturica. At the time, Kusturica was notable filmmaker who won the Palme d'Or at the 1985 Cannes Film Festival and was nominated for the Academy Award for Best Foreign Language Film with the When Father Was Away on Business. This refreshed lineup, in collaboration with some studio musicians such as bassist Dragan Bobić, keyboardist Dado Džihan, and bass guitarist Darko Ostojić, released Pozdrav iz zemlje Safari (transl. Greetings from the Safari land) through Diskoton in 1987. Diskoton censors had some objections and the song "Our Proposal for the Eurovision Song Contest" had to be renamed, since the song included comments on the depressed state of the economy and the lack of freedom of expression. The album again included a number of hit songs, such as "Pišonja i Žuga", "Hadžija ili bos", "Fikreta", "Dan Republike", and returned the band to stardom. The album was recorded in Sarajevo and mixed in London, UK, while the record producer was Sven Rustempašić, a Seattle-based producer born in Sarajevo. The following tour, which included 87 concerts, was the largest Zabranjeno Pušenje tour thus far and the band was by that time regarded as one of the Yugoslav rock powerhouse alongside Azra, Bijelo Dugme and Parni Valjak. In January 1988, the band received a gold record for 100,000 copies sold.

In October 1988, the band released their fourth album Male priče o velikoj ljubavi (transl. The Little Stories About a Big Love). The songs were mostly written and produced by Sejo Sexon. The album featured opera singer Sonja Milenković, violinist Dejan Sparavalo and Goran Bregović as backing vocal and guitar player. The album was an average success. The band embarked on the tour with Bombaj štampa and the rest of Top lista nadrealista crew (those who didn't play in the band already). The tour (a combination of theatre and rock and roll, an idea by Sejo Sexon, was a great success and regarded as the best tour of 1989 with around 60 concerts and more than 200,000 visitors.

=== 1990–1995: Band split and transitional period ===
Nele Karajlić and Sejo Sexon, the band's leading duo, were getting on increasingly colder terms and the Yugoslavia-wide tour with Bombaj Štampa and Top lista nadrealista during early 1990, though hugely commercially successful, only exacerbated their fractured business and personal relationship. The band broke up in late summer 1990 when Sejo Sexon informed Karajlić about no longer being interested in playing with him. Sejo Sexon, Darko Ostojić and Faris Arapović left the band due to different views on the band vision more than the political differences in Yugoslav leadership in the late 1980s. In that time, Sejo Sexon and Ostojić worked on their solo record for Diskoton, but that studio album went unreleased due to the start of the Bosnian War. Arapović joined the Sarajevo-based alternative rock band Sikter.

In April 1992, the Bosnian War began. Nele Karajlić had fled to Belgrade and continued working under the name Nele Karajlić & Zabranjeno Pušenje, later better known as Emir Kusturica & The No Smoking Orchestra. (Note: For a few years during mid-to-late 1990s, two parallel bands named Zabranjeno Pušenje existed. In early 1999, Nele Karajlić hooked up with filmmaker Emir Kusturica, himself former member of Zabranjeno Pušenje in mid-1980s, and they modified the name of Nele Karajlić's band to The No Smoking Orchestra. Playing off of Kusturica's popularity and high profile, the band was occasionally billed as Emir Kusturica & The No Smoking Orchestra.) Sejo Sexon, along with Elvis J. Kurtović, Zenit Đozić, Boris Šiber and the band's album cover designer Srđan Velimirović, remained in besieged Sarajevo, taking part in the wartime spinoff of Top lista nadrealista. In late June 1992, Top lista nadrealista crew started to work on a 15-minute weekly radio shows. In August 1993, after 50 odd shows on radio, the group shot and aired four television episodes. Sejo Sexon produced a soundtrack for TV series and a theater play Top lista nadrealista. After the Bosnian War Sejo Sexon moved to Zagreb, Croatia where he lived for some time. Later he came back to Sarajevo and together with Elvis J. Kurtović, who occasionally worked on the band's recordings, restored Zabranjeno Pušenje. After reunion of the band in 1996, Sejo Sexon and Elvis J. Kurović had more than 300 occasions where then performed live Top lista nadrealista across Bosnia and Herzegovina, Croatia, Slovenia, Germany, Austria, Denmark, and Switzerland. That tour was supported by the USAID office in Sarajevo.

=== 1996–2001: New beginnings in the post-Yugoslav area ===
In 1996, Sejo Sexon and Elvis J. Kurović accompanied with members of the Top lista nadrealista pit orchestra such as Sejo Kovo, Đani Pervan, Dušan Vranić, and Samir Ćeremida had become the core of the renewed band's lineup. During that time, the band works on their new studio album. The fifth album of Zabranjeno Pušenje Fildžan viška (transl. A Cup to Spare) is released through Dallas Records and Nimfa Sound in 1997. Sejo Sexon produced the album and wrote all songs with some help of Elvis J. Kurtović. Fildžan viška was produced four singles; "Možeš imat' moje tijelo", "Mile Hašišar", "Pubertet" and "Fildžan viška". Music videos for those single are produced by the band members. Production know-how from Top lista nadrealista has proven to be valuable in recording music videos, which were rated very well in Croatia, Bosnia and Herzegovina and Slovenia where the band performed regularly. Touring musicians were Sejo Sexon, Elvis J. Kurtović, Predrag Bobić, Zoran Stojanović, Nedžad Podžić, Marin Gradac, Bruno Urlić and Branko Trajkov, while Samir Ćeramida and Đani Pervan performed occasionally. The same lineup released the first live album Hapsi sve! through Croatia Records and A Records in 1998. The songs are recorded over two nights at Dom Sportova, in Zagreb on July 10, 1997, and at the Metalac schoolyard in Sarajevo on September 25, 1997. In the same time, the band had two guest appearances of Rambo Amadeus at their concerts for the Fildžan viška album promotion in Sarajevo. Those appearances were the first post-war performance by a Serbian-Montenegrin artist to the Bosnian Federation. In early 1997, Dario Vitez became executive producer, public relations manager and tour manager of the band.

The writing and formation of the band's next album, Agent tajne sile (transl. A Secret Force Agent) began immediately following the culmination of the promotional tour for Fildžan viška, in the start of 1999, at the Bjelolasica Olympic Centre in Gorski kotar, Croatia. The album was recorded in Rent-A-Cow Studio in Amsterdam, the Netherlands in March 1999 and produced by Sejo Sexon and Zlaja Jeff Hadžić. Agent tajne sile is released in June 1999 through TLN-Europa, an independent record label founded and own by Sejo Sexon. The record produced four singles; "Pos'o, kuća, birtija", "Agent tajne sile", "Jugo 45" and "Pupoljak". The record's third single, "Jugo 45", was the band's fastest-selling single, debuting on top of the Bosnian and Croatian charts. The band began another tour in support of Agent tajne sile in 1999, beginning with promotional concerts in Bosnia and Croatia with the touring lineup: Sejo Sexon, Marin Gradac, Elvis J. Kurtović, Predrag Bobić, Bruno Urlić, Dragomir Herendić, and Branko Trajkov. In a short while, Marin Gradac and Elvis J. Kurtović chose to leave the group due to other commitments. Gradac went to finish Sarajevo Music Academy and joined Radio Sarajevo Orchestra, while Elvis J. Kurtović began writing his solo album.

In early 2000, the band came back to the Bjelolasica Olympic Centre to work on the band's seventh album. In the meantime, the band got a new member; world-class percussionist Albin Jarić, better known as Jimi Rasta, who worked previously with musicians such as Dave Stewart and Eric Clapton. Bog vozi Mercedes (transl. God drives a Mercedes) was record by home made production in improvised studios in Bjelolasica and Ivanić Grad from March to June 2001. This record was planned to be a noncommercial break from the major music projects. No one expected that it would become one of the most selling Zabranjeno Pušenje albums. The album is released in December 2001 through TLN-Europa and Menart Records, and went on to sell more than 35,000 copies. Sejo Sexon wrote and produced four music videos, out of six released. For the song "Arizona Dream" the band won the 2002 Davorin Award for the best rock song. The concert tour by the band in support of their seventh studio album had 250 concerts.

In 2001, the band members took a part in a social responsibility project in which they organized music workshops for children and youth who were victims of land mines. Project was supported by embassies of Canada, Norway and the U.S. in Zagreb.

=== 2002–2011: Continued success ===
In 2002, the band went on the North American tour. On May 26, they had recorded the band's second live album at the Casa Loma Ballroom in St. Louis, Missouri. In 2004, the band released Live in St. Louis. This live album featured two new music videos, "Zenica Blues" and "Posljednja oaza (Fikreta)". They made the video for their 1980s hit Zenica Blues following the 20th Anniversary of the song's release. The video was shot in the Zenica prison. In 2003, Zabranjeno Pušenje was awarded for their outstanding live performance on the Baščaršija Nights festival in Sarajevo. During 2004, Albin Jarić, Bruno Urlić and Dragomir Herendić left the group due to other commitments. Jarić devotes himself to family life in Kranj, Slovenia. Herendić completed his own studio in Ivanić Grad and get focused on his production career. Urlić took over band-leadership of the Macedonian folk band Ezerki & 7/8 from Zagreb. and started his studio music and production career.

In a short period without guitarists and violinists, Sejo Sexon, Trajkov, and Bobić began the writing and formation on sketches of something that will evolve in three years to the double-full-length studio album. In a short period of time, violinist Robert Boldižar and guitarist Toni Lović joined in. Boldižar was touring musician in 1997, while the band's violinist Urlić was on leave to Paris, France. The new lineup immediately began to wrap up music for the next album and went on a short tour. Meanwhile, keyboardist Paul Kempf step in the empty seat. In 2005, right after record producer Denis Mujadžić (a.k.a. Denyken) joined the record project, Sejo Sexon got the opportunity to write a film score for the 2006 Bosnian action comedy film Nafaka directed by Jasmin Duraković. On that project he got an opportunity to collaborate with prominent musicians of different genres, such as: Halid Bešlić, Arsen Dedić, Lucija Šerbedžija, and the Mosque Choir Arabeske. On June 26, 2006, the song "Nema više", the first single from their upcoming album and Nafaka Soundtrack as well, was released and became a hit single. Sejo Sexon wrote this song with a Bosnian prose writer and playwright Nenad Veličković. On November 16, 2006, the band released their eighth studio album Hodi da ti čiko nešto da! (transl. Come, Uncle Wants to Give You Something), their first double album since Dok čekaš sabah sa šejtanom (1985).

Although the concert tour was truly enviable as in the time before, the period after the 2006 album release, next to the Australian Tour and the concerts in Paris and London, brought two great disappointments to the band, cancellations of the significant concerts in Belgrade and Sarajevo. At the first, there was a cancellation of the Sarajevo Concert as a result of the voracity of the Sarajevo Film Festival Board, who managed to redirect the concert's sponsorships to the Festival's budget. Next hit was wresting the 29 November Concert in Belgrade by former band members settled in Belgrade and gathered around The No Smoking Orchestra. The band had the Day of the Republic project in which 29 November should become the traditional concert date for Belgrade fans.

In September 2008, a longtime bassist Predrag Bobić left the bend after a farewell concert at Zagreb's lake Bundek. Afterwards, guitarist Dejan Orešković, former bassist of Divlje jagode, joined the group and played on their subsequent album.

The ninth studio album Muzej revolucije (transl. The Museum of the Revolution) is released on November 7, 2009, on the 92nd anniversary of the October Revolution. The album is released on the same day through various record labels in Bosnia and Herzegovina, Croatia, Montenegro, Serbia and Slovenia. The record produced five singles; "Modni Guru", "Kladimo se", "Kada Sena pleše", "Tvoja bosa stopala" and "Samir-time". In 2011, Sejo Sexon directed a music video for the third single of Muzej revolucije, entitled "Kada Sena pleše". It was his directorial debut. Also, he wrote the script for the same music video. On June 25, 2012, the band released the video for "Samir-time", the fifth and last single of Muzej revolucije.

=== 2012–2019: The milestone tenth studio album ===
In 2012, Sejo Sexon and Toni Lović entered the studio to begin writing for their tenth studio album. On October 10, 2013, Radovi na cesti (transl. Road Work) was released through Croatia Records and Dallas Records. The album was met with mostly positive reviews from the critics. The record produced six singles; "Boško i Admira", "Ti voliš sapunice", "Tri kile, tri godine", "U Tvoje ime", "Klasa optimist" and "Kafana kod Keke".

On 28 December 2013, Sučić and Zabranjeno pušenje marked the 30th anniversary of the band’s activity with a concert held at the Skenderija, Sarajevo, performed for their fans. Guest appearances included Halid Bešlić, Mile Kekin, the group Arabeske, as well as former members Mustafa Čengić (Mujo Snažni), Darko Ostojić (Minka), Samir Ćeramida, Jadranko Džihan, and Zenit Đozić (Fu-do). In January 2016, the band was joined by saxophonist and flautist Lana Škrgatić, while keyboardist Paul Kempf decided to leave the group in early 2017. During 2017, the band performed at the EXIT Summer of Love 2017 in Novi Sad and at the Belgrade Beer Fest.

At the end of October 2018, the group released its eleventh studio album, Šok i nevjerica (transl. Shock and Disbelief). The majority of the songs were written and produced by Sejo Sexon and Toni Lović. Guest performers on the album included Tuzla-based rapper Sassja and Sarajevo singer-songwriter Damir Imamović. In October 2018, a music video was also released for the single "Irska" ("Ireland"). The promotional tour for the new studio album, culminating with a concert at the Skenderija in Sarajevo on 29 December 2018, commenced with performances in Belgrade and Zagreb. The tour officially began with a concert in Belgrade on 29 October 2018. The Sarajevo concert, featuring guest appearances by Zele Lipovača and Alen Islamović, also marked the band's 35th career anniversary.

In early October 2019, the group embarked on a world tour commemorating 35 years since the release of their debut studio album. As part of this tour, four concerts were held in Canada, three in Australia, and three in Northern Europe. Additional concerts were staged in Zagreb and Split in mid-October 2019. The opening act at the Zagreb and Split performances was the Zagreb punk rock band Mašinko, with guest appearances by Predrag Bobić (Bleka), Mustafa Čengić (Mujo Snažni), and Dražen Žerić of Crvena Jabuka. In November 2019, Škrgatić left the group to join an all-female music ensemble, while by the end of 2019 the band welcomed singer Anđela Zebec into its lineup.

=== 2020–present: Recent years ===
During 2020 and 2021, amid the COVID-19 pandemic, the band members recorded 16 new songs for a forthcoming studio album. The tracks were written and produced by Sejo Sexon and Toni Lović in collaboration with other authors, while the arrangements were jointly credited to the entire group. For the first time in 15 years, the band collaborated on an album with former member Elvis J. Kurtović. In June 2020, they released the single and music video "Korona hit pozitivan" (transl. Coronavirus hit positive), created in cooperation with Kurtović. In April 2022, the band issued their third live album, Live in Skenderija Sarajevo 2018. Their twelfth studio album, and the first double album, Karamba!, was released on 3 June 2022. The record was preceded by the single "Ekrem", accompanied by a video directed once again by Tomislav Fiket, featuring actor Asim Ugljen in the role of Ekrem. In mid-2022, the band was joined by Tomislav Goluban, a blues musician, composer, and harmonica player.

In 2025, two live albums were released. In May, the fourth live album, Pušenje ubija (transl. Smoking Kills), was issued, featuring recordings from the concert held on 7 June 2024 at the Šalata venue in Zagreb, part of the anniversary tour marking the 40th anniversary of the cult album Das ist Walter. The concert also featured the debut performance of young keyboardist Vito Sučić, son of Zabranjeno pušenje's founder Davor Sučić. Subsequently, the band released its fifth live album, Uživo u Lisinskom (transl. Live at Lisinski). All tracks on this release were recorded on 8 February 2025 during the concert Zabranjeno pušenje kao Neuštekani (transl. Zabranjeno pušenje as Unplugged) at the Vatroslav Lisinski Concert Hall in Zagreb. Zabranjeno pušenje and their frontman Sejo Sexon initiated the Neuštekani Project (a Croatian translation of "Unplugged"), in which the band performs their songs on acoustic instruments.

== Musical style ==
In the early 1980s, when the rest of the Yugoslav popular music scene followed the trends in Europe of the early 1980s, chiefly punk rock and new wave, Zabranjeno Pušenje were part of a unique rock movement centered in Sarajevo that forged its own path. This movement, for the most part, centered on simple, youthful, garage rock, with folk influences and a distinctive Sarajevo urban feel called New Primitivism.

The songs range from punk rock to rock, frequently arranged to feature trumpets and saxophones, adding to the band's unique sound, along with many samples and soundbites from the period. Zabranjeno Pušenje captured the feel of Sarajevo, its idols and local heroes along with tales of love and loss, in a distinctive and often humorous way. Very visual and cynical, the band's lyrics were progressive enough to show the last stages of Yugoslav socialism (songs "Dan republike", "Srce ruke i lopata", "Abid", "Guzonjin sin"), alternate clubs ("Pišonja i Žuga u paklu droge", "Javi mi"), as well as providing morbid hints for the Yugoslav Wars ("Kanjon Drine", "Zvijezda nad Balkanom").

== Members ==
=== Current ===
- Davor Sučić (a.k.a. Sejo Sexon) – guitar, lead vocals, backing vocals (1980–1990; 1995–present)
- Branko Trajkov (a.k.a. Trak) – drums, percussion, acoustic guitar, backing vocals (1996–present)
- Toni Lović – electric guitar, acoustic guitar (2004–present)
- Robert Boldižar – violin, keyboards, backing vocals (2004–present)
- Dejan Orešković (a.k.a. Klo) – bass (2008–present)
- Tomislav Goluban – harmonica player (2022–present)
- Anđela Zebec (a.k.a. Angie) – backing vocals, percussion (2019–present)

Source: Zabranjeno Pušenje

=== Former ===
- Faris Arapović – drums (1987–1990)
- Kristina Biluš – backing vocals (1999)
- Predrag Bobić (a.k.a. Bleka) (credited as Dragan Bobić) – bass (1996–2008)
- Mustafa Čengić (a.k.a. Mujo Snažni) – guitar, backing vocals (1980–1986)
- Samir Ćeremida – bass (1996–1998)
- Zoran Degan (a.k.a. Poka) – keyboards (1980–1983)
- Zenit Đozić (a.k.a. Fu-do) – drums, percussion, backing vocals (1980–1983; 1985)
- Dado Džihan – keyboards (1987–1990)
- Ognjen Gajić – saxophone, concert flute, keyboards (1980–1987)
- Marin Gradac (a.k.a. Mako) – trombone, vocals (1996–1999)
- Dragomir Herendić (a.k.a. Dragianni) – lead guitar (1999–2004)
- Dražen Janković (a.k.a. Seid Mali Karajlić) – keyboards, backing vocals (1980–1981; 1984–1987)
- Nenad Janković (a.k.a. Dr. Nele Karajlić) – lead vocals, keyboards (1980–1990)
- Albin Jarić (a.k.a. Jimi Rasta) – percussion (2001–2004)
- Paul Kempf (a.k.a. Pavo) – keyboards (2005–2017)
- Predrag Kovačević (a.k.a. Kova / Kowalski) – guitar (1986–1990)
- Sead Kovo (a.k.a. Sejo) – guitar (1996–1999)
- Emir Kusturica – bass (1987)
- Mladen Mitić (a.k.a. Munja) – bass, backing vocals (1980–1986)
- Darko Ostojić (a.k.a. Ogi) – bass (1987–1990)
- Đani Pervan – drums (1996)
- Nedžad Podžić (a.k.a. Počko) – keyboards, backing vocals (1996–1998)
- Predrag Rakić (a.k.a. Šeki Gayton) – drums (1983–1986)
- Mirko Srdić (a.k.a. Elvis J. Kurtovich) – backing vocals (1996–1999)
- Zoran Stojanović – electric guitar (1996–1998)
- Lana Škrgatić – saxophone, concert flute, backing vocals (2016–2019)
- Bruno Urlić (a.k.a. Prco) – violin, viola, keyboards, backing vocals (1997–2004)
- Dušan Vranić (a.k.a. Duco) – keyboards, backing vocals (1996–1997)

== Awards and nominations ==
Year	Nominated work	Category	Award	Result	Notes	Ref.
2002	"Arizona Dream"	Best Rock Song	Davorin Awards	Won	Bog vozi Mercedes	
2002	Bog vozi Mercedes	Best Album Cover Design	Davorin Awards	Won	Dario Vitez & Srđan Velimirović	
2003	www.zabranjeno-pusenje.com	Best Artist Website Design	Davorin Awards	Won	Dario Vitez	
2003	Zabranjeno Pušenje	Outstanding Live Performance	Baščaršija Nights	Won		
2004	20th Debut Album's Anniversary	Honorary Award "50 Years of Popular Music"	Davorin Awards	Won		
2005	Live In St. Louis	Best Live Album	Davorin Awards	Won		
2007	Hodi da ti čiko nešto da	Rock Album of the Year	Davorin Awards	Nominated		
2007	"Dobro dvorište"	Rock Song of the Year	Davorin Awards	Nominated	Hodi da ti čiko nešto da	
2007	"Dobro dvorište"	Rock Music Video of the Year	Davorin Awards	Nominated	Hodi da ti čiko nešto da	
2007	"Nema više"	Rock Song of the Year	Davorin Awards	Nominated	Hodi da ti čiko nešto da	
2007	"Nema više"	Rock Music Video of the Year	Davorin Awards	Nominated	Hodi da ti čiko nešto da	
2007	Zabranjeno Pušenje	Rock Performer of the Year	Davorin Awards	Won		
2007	Sejo Sexon	Best Male Singer	Davorin Awards	Nominated		
2007	Zabranjeno Pušenje & Arsen Dedić	Collaboration of the Year	Davorin Awards	Nominated		
2007	Toni Lović	Best Pop/Rock/Urban Guitarist	Status Awards	Nominated		
2010	Dejan Orešković	Best Pop/Rock/Urban Bassist	Status Awards	Nominated		
2010	Robert Boldižar	Best Pop/Rock/Urban Violinist (Note: Category include all performers on other musical instruments besides guitars, drums, keyboards and winds.)	Status Awards	Nominated		
2015	Dejan Orešković	Best Pop/Rock/Urban Bassist	Status Awards	Nominated		
2017	Toni Lović	Best Guitarist	Mega Muzika Fender Awards	Won		
2017	Zabranjeno Pušenje	Best Band	Mega Muzika Fender Awards	Won		

== Discography ==
=== Studio albums ===
- Das ist Walter (1984)
- Dok čekaš sabah sa šejtanom (1985)
- Pozdrav iz zemlje Safari (1987)
- Male priče o velikoj ljubavi (1989)
- Fildžan viška (1997)
- Agent tajne sile (1999)
- Bog vozi Mercedes (2001)
- Hodi da ti čiko nešto da (2006)
- Muzej revolucije (2009)
- Radovi na cesti (2013)
- Šok i nevjerica (2018)
- Karamba! (2022)

== See also ==
- Top lista nadrealista
- Shaderwan Code
- The No Smoking Orchestra
- New Primitivism
