= Samir Ćeremida =

Bosnian guitarist

- Also known as: Ćera I
- Born: 6 November 1964 (age 60); Sarajevo, SR Bosnia and Herzegovina, Yugoslavia
- Genres: Rock; pop rock; power pop; folk rock
- Occupation: Musician
- Instrument: Bass guitar
- Years active: 1981–present

Samir Ćeremida "Ćera I" (Note: In some sources, Ćeremida is mistakenly referred as Ćeramida.) (born 6 November 1964) is a Bosnian musician, best known as the bass guitarist for the pop rock band Plavi Orkestar. His twin brother Admir Ćeremida "Ćera II" is the drummer in the same band.

== Biography ==
=== Early life ===
Ćeremida was born in Sarajevo, then capital of the SR Bosnia and Herzegovina to Mahmut Ćeremida (1925-2004) and Jasminka Ćeremida. His father was a local lawyer, a World War II veteran, and a pious Sunni Muslim who attended the Hajj earning the title of hadžija (Hajji) upon returning home.

At the age of six, Ćeremida started playing the guitar.

=== Early career ===
In the early 1980s, Ćeremida performed with several Sarajevo bands, such as Linija Života (Life Line), Posljednji Autobus (The Last Bus), and Elvis J. Kurtović & His Meteors, before being offered to play with Zabranjeno Pušenje, remaining with the band for a year. Three months before his compulsory military service, he left Zabranjeno Pušenje and joined Plavi Orkestar, at the time already featuring his twin brother Admir on drums.

=== Plavi Orkestar ===
Ćeremida joined Plavi Orkestar in 1983, the group at the time featuring his twin brother Admir on drums, vocalist Saša Lošić and guitarist Mladen Pavičić "Pava". After only three months with the band, left to serve his mandatory stint in the Yugoslav People's Army. He served his military service in Niš, SR Serbia. Upon completing his stint in the military, he rejoined Plavi Orkestar. In the early stage of their career, Plavi Orkestar were associated with the New Primitivism subcultural movement, but after starting to cooperate with manager Goran Marić, alias Malkolm Muharem, they turned towards commercial folk-influenced pop rock and power pop sound. Their debut album Soldatski bal (Soldier's Ball), released in 1985, saw mixed reactions by the Yugoslav music critics, but achieved large success with the country's teen audience, becoming the best-selling debut album in the history of Yugoslav popular music, and placing Plavi Orkestar alongside other mega-selling acts of the Yugoslav rock scene like Bijelo Dugme, Riblja Čorba and Bajaga i Instruktori. In 1986, the band released the album Smrt fašizmu! (Death to Fascism!), presenting themselves with the concept named New Partisans, featuring lyrics and imagery inspired by Yugoslav Partisans and Yugoslavism. The album was generally disliked by the critics and was met wit lukewarm reactions from the band's former fans, the members ending their cooperation with Malkolm Muharem and deciding to make a discographic hiatus. With the album Sunce na prozoru, released in 1989, the band turned to sentimental pop rock sound. Despite not repeating the nationwide success of the group's first album, Sunce na prozoru and their following release, the 1991 album Simpatija, brought a number of hit songs. The outbreak of the Bosnian War in 1992 forced the band members to end their activity, Ćeremida emigrating to Paris.

In 1998, Plavi Orkestar reunited in Slovenia, featuring Lošić, Ćeremida brothers and new guitarist Saša Zalepugin. The band's 1998 comeback album Longplay was well-received in former Yugoslav republics. The band continued to perform and record new material, releasing two more studio albums since.

=== Overdream and Zabranjeno Pušenje ===
After emigrating to Paris, Ćeremida formed the band Overdream with former members of less-known Sarajevo bands. They released their self-titled album in 1996. Ćeremida also took part in the recording of the album Fildžan viška (A Cup to Spare) of the Zagreb faction of Zabranjeno Pušenje.

=== Other activities ===
During his staying in Paris, Ćeremida also worked as the arranger and co-producer on the album by French singer Alexandra Ross, and took part in the recording of the 1996 album Ruže u asfaltu (Roses in Asphalt) by Teška Industrija.

=== Personal life ===
Upon returning from the army and rejoining Plavi Orkestar, Ćeremida also enrolled at the Faculty of Veterinary Medicine in Sarajevo, ceasing his studies after two years.

Ćeremida and his twin brother Admir operate a bar named Havana in the Sarajevo's historical downtown Baščaršija.

== Discography ==
=== With Plavi Orkestar ===
==== Studio albums ====
- Soldatski bal (1985)
- Smrt fašizmu (1986)
- Sunce na prozoru (1989)
- Simpatija (1991)
- Long Play (1998)
- Infinity (1999)
- Sedam (2012)

=== With Overdream ===
==== Studio albums ====
- Overdream (1996)

=== With Zabranjeno Pušenje ===
==== Studio albums ====
- Fildžan viška (1997)
