= Elvis J. Kurtović =

Bosnian actor and musician

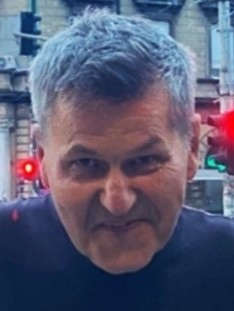
- Srdić in 2022
- Born: Mirko Srdić; 26 February 1962 (age 64); Sarajevo, PR Bosnia and Herzegovina, FPR Yugoslavia
- Education: 2nd Sarajevo Gymnasium
- Alma mater: University of Sarajevo
- Occupations: singer; songwriter; composer; actor; music editor
- Years active: 1981–present
- Musical career
- Genres: New Primitivism; Rock; Garage Rock; Punk rock
- Instruments: Vocals, guitar
- Labels: Diskoton; RTV Ljubljana

Mirko Srdić (born 26 February 1962), better known by his stage name Elvis J. Kurtović, is a Bosnian rock and roll musician, actor, comedian, and music editor. He is most notable as the bandleader and co-founder of the Yugoslav punk rock band Elvis J. Kurtović & His Meteors. He was one of the founders of the New Primitivism movement in his hometown Sarajevo. As an actor, he has been featured in the Top lista nadrealista and the Nadreality Show.

== Career ==
Kurtović was born in Sarajevo, SR Bosnia and Herzegovina, SFR Yugoslavia (present-day Bosnia and Herzegovina) where he finished elementary school and the 2nd Sarajevo Gymnasium. He earned his degree in civil engineering from the University of Sarajevo.

In 1981, Kurtović with Dražen Janković and Sejo Sexon established a punk rock band Elvis J. Kurtović & His Meteors. He has contributed on all Elvis J. Kurtović & His Meteors releases; Mitovi i legende o kralju Elvisu (1984), Da bog da crk'o rok'n'rol (1985), and The Wonderful World of Private Business (1988).

In 1996, Kurtović accompanied Sejo Sexon, Predrag Bobić, and Samir Ćeramida, with whom he restarted the band Zabranjeno Pušenje, disbanded in the early 1990s. He performed on their two studio albums; Fildžan viška (1997) and Agent tajne sile (1999).

== Discography ==
Elvis J. Kurtović & His Meteors

- Mitovi i legende o kralju Elvisu (1984)
- Da bog da crk'o rok'n'rol (1985)
- The Wonderful World of Private Business (1988)

Zabranjeno pušenje

- Fildžan viška (1996)
- Hapsi sve! (1998)
- Agent tajne sile (1999)

== Filmography ==
Year	Title	Role	Notes
1989–1991	Top lista nadrealista (TV Series)	Guest roles	Seasons 2
1999	Temni angeli usode		
2002	On Our Own Vesna	Interpol policeman	
2007	Nadreality Show (TV Series)		Also screenwriter
2019	Crno-bijeli svijet (TV Series)	SDB Agent	
