= Diskoton =

Yugoslavian music label

- Founded: 1974
- Status: Defunct since 1992
- Genre: Various
- Country of origin: SFR Yugoslavia
- Location: Sarajevo

Diskoton was a major record label in SFR Yugoslavia, based in Sarajevo, Socialist Republic of Bosnia and Herzegovina. The company ceased to exist in 1992, with the outbreak of the War in Bosnia and Herzegovina. The studio was destroyed along with all master recordings.

== History ==
Diskoton was formally established in 1972 in Sarajevo at the instigation of Asim Haverić, then an employee of the record label Beograd Disk (later to become Jugodisk). He persuaded Jovo Beatović, manager of the city public utility company Park in Sarajevo, to organize a record production company within his enterprise.

Record production began in 1973 and Diskoton operated as a subsidiary of Park until 1977, when it became an independent company. Diskoton's premises were located in Pionirska dolina, a popular city park and zoo maintained by the Park company. The label acquired its name through a public call advertised via the popular weekly gossip-lifestyle magazine/newspaper, Ven, opting to pick a name suggested by young musician Brano Likić, later the founder and leader of the band Rezonansa.

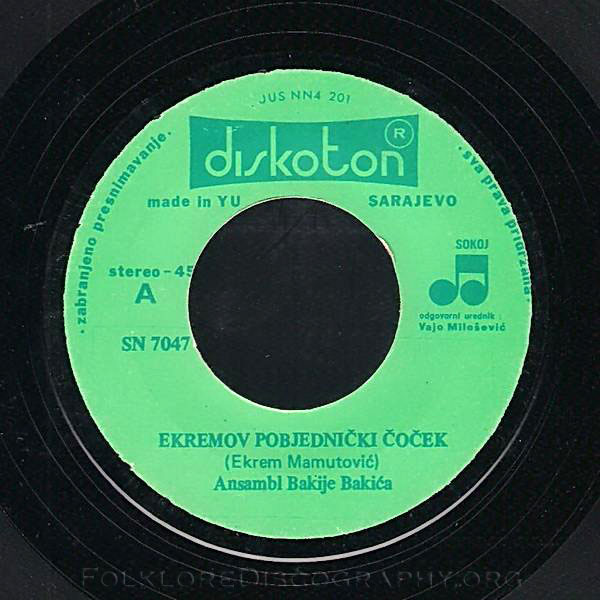
Diskoton label on Ansambl Branka Milenovića vinyl record.

Diskoton's first equipment were French-made automatic press machines Materiel Applications Plastiques (MAP) for 7" record manufacturing. In the earliest months of operation, due to unskilled staff, a large quantity of PVC was wasted because the machines produced defective records, which were then trashed. Diskoton could manufacture only singles and EP records until late 1975, when they acquired the equipment for manufacturing LP records as well as cassettes. Starting from 1980, Diskoton began occasionally using the service pressing of Jugoton pressing plant, while it became almost entirely dependent on the service pressing of PGP-RTB pressing plant by the late 1980s.

The most prominent A&R executives of Diskoton were Vajo Milošević and Slobodan Vujović, the latter being the former leader of the band Ambasadori. In 1987, Nevad Hadžić, a graduate of the Academy of Music in Sarajevo, joined Diskoton as Editor in Chief for Folk Music and inspired many already established performers to publish their music with Diskoton.

With the outbreak of the Bosnian War, the company ceased to exist in 1992. The studio was completely destroyed along with all master tapes and recordings, meaning that most albums are unavailable in master quality (apart from the few that were released in the short time that Diskoton was producing CDs before its literal collapse).

== Artists ==
Diskoton is notable for signing numerous eminent former Yugoslav pop and rock, as well as folk acts. Some of the artists that have been signed to Diskoton, include:

- Amajlija
- Ambasadori
- Bajaga i Instruktori
- Đorđe Balašević
- Bele Višnje
- Halid Bešlić
- Bijelo Dugme
- Goran Bregović
- Zdravko Čolić
- Arsen Dedić
- Divlje Jagode
- Raša Đelmaš
- Formula 4
- Duško Gojković
- Osman Hadžić
- Hari Mata Hari
- Indexi
- Safet Isović
- Jugosloveni
- Kameleoni
- Kongres
- Lepa Brena
- Lutajuća Srca
- Mugdim Avdić "Henda"
- Srđan Marjanović
- Seid Memić Vajta
- Merlin
- Metak
- Kemal Monteno
- Hanka Paldum
- Josip Pejaković
- Plavi Orkestar
- Zoran Predin
- Regina
- Boba Stefanović
- Jadranka Stojaković
- Miladin Šobić
- Tifa Band
- Neda Ukraden
- Valentino
- Vatreni Poljubac
- Milić Vukašinović
- Zabranjeno Pušenje
- Zana

Like other former Yugoslav labels, Diskoton also had a licence to release foreign titles for the Yugoslav market including notable international popular music stars such as: Commodores, Marvin Gaye, Gonzalez, Roy Harper, John Holt, Diana Ross, Tavares, The Temptations, Stevie Wonder, and others.

== Competition ==
Other major labels in the former Socialist Federal Republic of Yugoslavia were PGP-RTB and Jugodisk from Belgrade, Jugoton and Suzy from Zagreb, ZKP RTLJ from Ljubljana, Diskos from Aleksandrovac, and others.
