= Cinema of Yugoslavia =

The Cinema of Yugoslavia refers to the film industry and cinematic output of the former Socialist Federal Republic of Yugoslavia, which existed from 1945 until it disintegrated into several independent states in the early 1990s. Yugoslavia was a multi-ethnic, socialist state, and its cinema reflected the diversity of its population, as well as the political and cultural shifts that occurred during its existence.

== Overview ==
The Socialist Federal Republic of Yugoslavia had an internationally acclaimed film industry. Yugoslavia submitted many films to the Academy Award for Best Foreign Language Film, six of which were nominated. Film companies included Jadran Film from Zagreb, SR Croatia; Avala Film from Belgrade, SR Serbia; Sutjeska film and Studio film from Sarajevo, SR Bosnia and Herzegovina; Zeta film from Budva, SR Montenegro; Vardar film and Makedonija film from Skopje, SR Macedonia, Triglav Film from Ljubljana, SR Slovenia and others.

The dominant movement in Yugoslav cinema of the post war era was Socialist Realism. Which typically dealt with themes such as modernity, and the importance of building the new socialist republic. This was a movement popular in most eastern bloc countries. As the early Yugoslavian state moved away from the Soviet bloc, and received a more open door into western capitalist societies. The cinema started to change to reflect this more liberal approach to socialism. The Yugoslav Black Wave which was started by young filmmakers in 1960s reflected this change by taking elements of socialist realism, American and Italian cinema. To create films that more openly criticized the problems of liberalization. These films usually turned a lens onto the bigger issues of ethnicity, gender and class in Yugoslav society and were often seen as pessimistic by critics.

Prominent male actors included Danilo Stojković, Ljuba Tadić, Bekim Fehmiu, Fabijan Šovagović, Mustafa Nadarević, Bata Živojinović, Boris Dvornik, Ljubiša Samardžić, Dragan Nikolić and Rade Šerbedžija, while Milena Dravić, Neda Arnerić, Mira Furlan and Ena Begović were notable actresses. Acclaimed film directors included: Emir Kusturica, Dušan Makavejev, Goran Marković, Lordan Zafranović, Goran Paskaljević, Živojin Pavlović and Hajrudin Krvavac. Many Yugoslav films featured eminent foreign actors such as Orson Welles and Yul Brynner in the Academy Award nominated The Battle of Neretva, and Richard Burton in Sutjeska. Also, many foreign films were shot on locations in Yugoslavia including domestic crews, such as Force 10 from Navarone starring Harrison Ford, Robert Shaw and Franco Nero, Armour of God starring Jackie Chan, as well as Escape from Sobibor starring Alan Arkin, Joanna Pacuła and Rutger Hauer. Pula Film Festival was a notable film festival.

Partisan film is a subgenre of war films, made in Yugoslavia during the 1960s, 1970s and 1980s. In the broadest sense, main characteristics of partisan films are that they are set in Yugoslavia during World War II and have partisans as main protagonists, while antagonists are Axis forces and their collaborators. Outside Yugoslavia, Partisan films were especially popular in China.

The Yugoslav Film Archive was a founding member of the International Federation of Film Archives and was the national film library of the former Yugoslavia, founded in 1949 in Belgrade.

== Films ==
- Battle of Neretva
- Battle of Sutjeska
- Walter Defends Sarajevo
- Do You Remember Dolly Bell?
- Ko to tamo peva
- The Bridge (1969 film)
- Lude godine
- The Marathon Family
- Time of the Gypsies
- Tko pjeva zlo ne misli
- When Father Was Away on Business
- I Even Met Happy Gypsies

Co-production:

- Kelly's Heroes
- Captain America (1990 film)
- Armour of God
- A Corpse Hangs in the Web
- Le Prix du Danger
- High Road to China
- Transylvania 6-5000 (1985 film)
- Genghis Khan (1965 film)
- The Trial (1962 film)
- W.R.: Mysteries of the Organism
- The Long Ships (film)
- Taras Bulba (1962 film)
- Escape from Sobibor
- Score (1974 film)
- Old Shatterhand (film)
- Winnetou film series
- Kapò
- Man and Beast
- Destination Death

== Television ==
- Top lista nadrealista

== See also ==
- Lists of Yugoslav films
- Cinema of Bosnia and Herzegovina
- Cinema of Croatia
- Cinema of Montenegro
- Cinema of North Macedonia
- Cinema of Serbia
- Cinema of Slovenia
