= Hajrudin Krvavac =

Film director (1926–1992)

- Born: 22 December 1926; Sarajevo, Kingdom of Yugoslavia
- Died: 11 July 1992 (aged 65); Sarajevo, Republic of Bosnia and Herzegovina
- Other name: Šiba
- Occupations: Film director, writer
- Notable work: Valter brani Sarajevo

Hajrudin "Šiba" Krvavac (22 December 1926 – 11 July 1992) was a Bosnian and Yugoslav film director most notable for directing movies from the Partisan film genre during 1960s and 70s.

His gift for precise storytelling was visible in his early documentaries and would become a staple of his feature films later on. Starting with his directorial debut, the segment Otac (Father) of the anthology film Vrtlog (Vortex, 1964), all his feature films are action films set in World War II. Their storytelling owes a lot to comic books and American action films, especially westerns, with an imaginative combination of action and emotions, personal drama and epic tragedy, idealised heroism and psychological trials, sometimes with a dose of humor. Because of the style of his films, Krvavac was sometimes compared to Howard Hawks.

== Early life and career ==
Hajrudin Krvavac was born in the Mejtaš neighborhood of Sarajevo, Bosnia and Herzegovina on 22 December 1926. His parents, both originally from Gacko, were Muslims and ethnic Bosniaks. Krvavac had a brother Sabahudin.

As a teenager in Sarajevo, Krvavac assisted the Partisan resistance on the outskirts of the city that like the rest of Bosnia had since April 1941 been occupied by the newly created Nazi German puppet entity Independent State of Croatia — the youngster reportedly made treks out of the city on four separate occasions in order to take part in actions organized by local resistance leader Valter Perić.

As the World War II ended and Federal People's Republic of Yugoslavia got established, Krvavac moved to Belgrade for college (viša škola) studies, enrolling in a diplomacy and journalism program. Upon returning to Sarajevo, on suggestion from his friend Eli Finci, Krvavac decided to pursue film direction despite possessing no formal training.

During early 1950s he got jailed by Yugoslav authorities on Goli otok, a political prison for Soviet-leaning Yugoslav communists following the Tito–Stalin Split and the subsequent Informbiro period.

=== Partisan film ===
Hajrudin Krvavac was one of the leading film directors of the Partisan Film genre during the 1960s and 1970s. Krvavac is most well known for his trilogy of Partisan Films, which exemplified the communist government’s idea of “brotherhood and unity” (bratstvo i jedinstvo). The trilogy depicted the Yugoslav Partisan struggle against the Nazi fascist forces during Second World War. The three films of Krvavac’s trilogy consist of: Diverzanti ("The Demolition Squad"), 1967; Most ("The Bridge"), 1969; and his masterpiece, Valter brani Sarajevo ("Walter Defends Sarajevo"), 1972.

However, Krvavac was most well known for incorporating American Western film elements into his Partisan films. For example, Krvavac’s Most, has been compared to Western classics like The Dirty Dozen and The Bridge on the River Kwai. Krvavac’s trilogy was designed to both “relax and influence the mind,” of the audience as many American movies during the same time period aspired to do. Moreover, many film analysts have compared the main character of Walter Defends Sarajevo to that of James Bond, where in scenes Walter is jumping from train to train and eluding Nazi capture. Most importantly, Krvavac’s films were created to be appropriate for audiences of all ages, in order to display the Partisan unity to all of Yugoslavia. This universality that Krvavac used was especially evident when he won the “Audience’s Award” at the 1967 Pula film festival for his film, Diverzanti.

Hajrudin Krvavac was influential in creating the unique subgenre of Partisan film, "Red Western" (crveni vestern). The “Red Western” genre contained many great masterpieces, such as Bitka na Neretvi, by Veljko Bulajić, which was nominated for a Best Foreign Language Film Oscar in 1969. Hajrudin Krvavac’s work influenced many other Yugoslav directors at the time, and together they helped create some of the greatest works of cinema to emerge from the former Yugoslav states.

== Selected filmography ==
- Vrtlog (1964)
- The Demolition Squad (1967)
- The Bridge (1969)
- Walter Defends Sarajevo (1972)
- Partizanska eskadrila (1979)

== Death ==
Krvavac died in July 1992 during the early months of the Siege of Sarajevo. When the Bosnian War started, he was offered to be taken out of Sarajevo to Serbia by Serbian actors Bata Živojinović and Ljubiša Samardžić, but he refused, and ultimately succumbed to a heart condition during the Siege of Sarajevo.

== Sources ==
- Yugoslavian Film Encyclopedia, Yugoslavian Lexicographic Institute "Miroslav Krleža", 1986–1990
