= Das ist Walter =

Studio album by Zabranjeno Pušenje
- Released: 10 April 1984
- Recorded: November 1983 – March 1984
- Studios: Studio 17, Sarajevo, Yugoslavia
- Genres: Garage rock; punk rock; new wave
- Length: 32:11
- Language: Serbo-Croatian
- Label: Jugoton
- Producer: Mahmut Paša Ferović

Zabranjeno Pušenje chronology
Das ist Walter (1984)	Dok čekaš sabah sa šejtanom (1985)

Das ist Walter (transl. That's Walter) is the debut studio album by Yugoslav band Zabranjeno Pušenje released on April 10, 1984. It was released through Jugoton in Yugoslavia.

The album title is the closing line from the 1972 partisan film Walter Defends Sarajevo and it refers to the city of Sarajevo. The first track is the theme from the film. The album recording began in November 1983 in Studio 17 that was located in record producer Mahmut Paša Ferović's house.

Released by Jugoton, the record was out in limited circulation of 3,000 copies, indicative of the label's modest expectations, however, it started selling surprisingly well, eventually crossing the mark of 100,000 copies sold. It also received plenty of accolades, including making the list of top 100 albums in the history of pop and rock music in Yugoslavia published in the 1998 book YU 100: The Greatest Yugoslav Rock and Pop Music Albums. Das ist Walter is listed in the 87th place.

The album was re-released in 2000 by Nimfa Sound.

== Recording ==
After gigging locally throughout 1982 and 1983 in their hometown Sarajevo, at clubs such as Kuk, Trasa, and CEDUS, Zabranjeno Pušenje was ready to take the next step—releasing a studio album. Consisting of seven energetic youngsters in their early 20s, itching to increase their profile on the scene, they recorded some dozen demos tracks during spring 1983 in a studio in Kiseljak. The lineup that recorded the demos was: frontman and vocalist Dr. Nele Karajlić, rhythm guitar player and main songwriter Sejo Sexon, lead guitarist Mujo Snažni, bassist Samir "Ćera I" Ćeremida, drummer Zenit "FuDo" Đozić, keyboards player Seid Mali Karajlić, and saxophonist Ogi Gajić.

At one of their gigs in Sarajevo's Trasa club sometime during summer 1983, the Zabranjeno Pušenje youngsters were seen by 33-year-old Milić Vukašinović, established Sarajevo-based musician fronting his own band Vatreni Poljubac having already experienced a measure of fame as former drummer of Bijelo Dugme during the 1970s, whom they gave their demo tape to on the occasion. Liking what he saw and heard, Vukašinović put them in touch with his friend and former late 1960s Čičak bandmate Mahmut "Paša" Ferović, who had lately been working as a producer by running a modest recording studio out of his own house.

Going into the studio to record the album, Zabranjeno Pušenje made some personnel changes compared to the lineup that had recorded the demos six months earlier. A new rhythm section came in with Munja Mitić and Šeki Gayton becoming the new bassist and drummer, respectively. Produced by Ferović, the recording sessions began in November 1983 and took almost 7 months to complete due to various extenuating circumstances. In a later interview, Karajlić stated the following about the recording sessions:

The process of recording Das ist Walter with Paša Ferović at his house was very symbolic of our entire rocky road as a band. It can be summed up as: "per aspera ad astra". It took about 7 months to complete the recording, not because we struggled with the material—quite contrary, we could do those songs in our sleep—but because the combination of us and Paša Ferović was like a one long continuous anecdote. I could literally write a book about those 7 months. For example, just one of the many things we had to overcome was that our typical working day consisted of seven band members getting up in the morning and then around 10 a.m. splitting up in groups that went from one kafana to another around the city of Sarajevo, looking for Paša Ferović who had spent the entire previous night drinking at one of these places. Unfortunately, there were no cellphones back then, which would've shortened this search considerably. After tracking him down, we would then literally peel him off the bar table and take him home to produce our record. It was the worst produced record in the history of Yugoslav rock n' roll, but the energy we injected in it is evident when you listen to it. And it's precisely that raw honesty that later struck a cord with a lot of people... Once we finally finished recording Das ist Walter, we were literally spent, both physically and emotionally, as evidenced by the fact that each and every person involved in making it was so stressed that we all fell ill from ailments ranging from liver cirrhosis to pneumonia. I for one ended up with enlarged lymph nodes all over my body.

The band's rhythm guitarist and main lyrics writer Sejo Sexon remembers the recording sessions as follows:

Recording Das ist Walter for months with Paša Ferović in his studio was like getting a master's degree and doctorate in rock and roll. We'd show up to his house to record at the time we had previously agreed, but he would never be there because he had been off drinking in some kafana. And all you'd see on the walls of his house were spray written anger outbursts and threats by his other studio clients that he had screwed over. Stuff like 'Paša, you're a dead man', 'Paša, you're fired', 'Never again, Paša'.... Then we realized that half of the equipment in his studio is not actually his. For example, one day Goran Bregović showed up at the studio to take back his 8-channel sound board, but we somehow persuaded him to leave it with Paša just a little while longer. So, basically if Brega hadn't been nice about it, we never would've made the album.... Then, the recording itself was another story. Seven of us recorded on 8 channels—those who know sound recording can appreciate how difficult that is—for example, we recorded the flute and timpani on the same channel..... But still, if it hadn't been for Paša Ferović and Milić Vukašinović, the band would've folded in 1983 or 1984 without ever making anything. It was a critical time for us, we were going into our fourth year together with very little to show for it and our families were already nagging us with stuff like 'what's the point of all this' and 'how much longer are you gonna be doing this pointless crap of yours'. And deep down we were on the verge of asking ourselves those questions too, fully conscious that if you now go and get a job as a waiter or gas station attendant, the band is finished.

Midway through the recording session, the young band got a hold of Radomir "Raka" Marić, Bijelo Dugme's manager, who helped them find a record label that would release the material. He first offered it to PGP RTB, but after they refused it, Marić contacted Jugoton's creative director Siniša Škarica who accepted it.

== Track listing ==
For songwriters, the lyrics author(s) is/are listed first, followed by the music author(s).

Johnny Cash, an American country musician, is credited on "Zenica Blues" due to the song's borrowing of musical elements from Cash's "San Quentin."

- Source: Discogs

Side A
No.	Title	Writer(s)	Arranger(s)	Length
1.	"Uvod" (Tema iz filma Valter brani Sarajevo)	Bojan Adamič		1:30
2.	"Anarhija All Over Baščaršija"	Davor Sučić; Nenad Janković	Mustafa Čengić	1:42
3.	"Abid"	N. Janković; N. Janković	Čengić	3:40
4.	"Put u središte rudnika Kreka Banovići"	Sučić; N. Janković	Sučić	2:07
5.	"Selena, vrati se, Selena"	N. Janković; Sučić	Čengić	4:03
6.	"Neću da budem švabo u dotiranom filmu"	Mirko Srdić; Zoran Degan	Čengić	2:30

Side B
No.	Title	Writer(s)	Arranger(s)	Length
1.	"Šeki is on the Road Again"	N. Janković; Sučić	Čengić	3:35
2.	"Kino Prvi Maj"	Sučić; Sučić	Čengić	4:09
3.	"Pamtim to kao da je bilo danas"	Sučić; Čengić		2:07
4.	"Zenica Blues"	Sučić; Johnny Cash	Čengić	2:27
5.	"Čejeni odlaze..."	N. Janković; N. Janković	Čengić	4:13

== Personnel ==
Credits adapted from the album's liner notes.

Zabranjeno pušenje

- Sejo Sexon – rhythm guitar
- Mladen Mitić Munja – bass
- Mustafa Čengić Mujo – solo guitar
- Predrag Rakić Šeki – drums, backing vocals
- Ognjen Gajić – saxophone, flute
- Seid Karajlić – organ, keyboards, backing vocals
- Nele Karajlić – lead vocals

Additional musicians

- Aida, Snježa and Haris – backing vocals (tracks A4, A5, A6, B1, B2, B4)
- Benja, Yooroe, Dado and Mujo – backing vocals (tracks A2, A3, B5)

Production

- Mahmut Paša Ferović – production, recording (Studio 17 in Sarajevo, YU)
- Silvano Bulešić – mastering (Jugoton in Zagreb, YU)
- Radomir Marić Raka – executive production
- Vukašin Babović – organizing
- Milić Vukašinović – supporting
- Dubravko Majnarić – editor-in-chief (Jugoton in Zagreb, YU)
- Siniša Škarica – music editor (Jugoton in Zagreb, YU)

Design

- Nenad Vasilijević – design, photos
- Rade Kosanović – design
- Nebojša Žigić – photos (Studio Ada in Belgrade, YU)
- Miloje Stevanić Đakon – photographic printing

== Legacy ==
In 2015, Balkanrock web magazine ranked the album cover of Das ist Walter 41st on its list of 100 Greatest Album Covers of Yugoslav Rock.

== See also ==
- New wave music in Yugoslavia
