= Čekaluša street =

Street in Sarajevo, Bosnia and Herzegovina

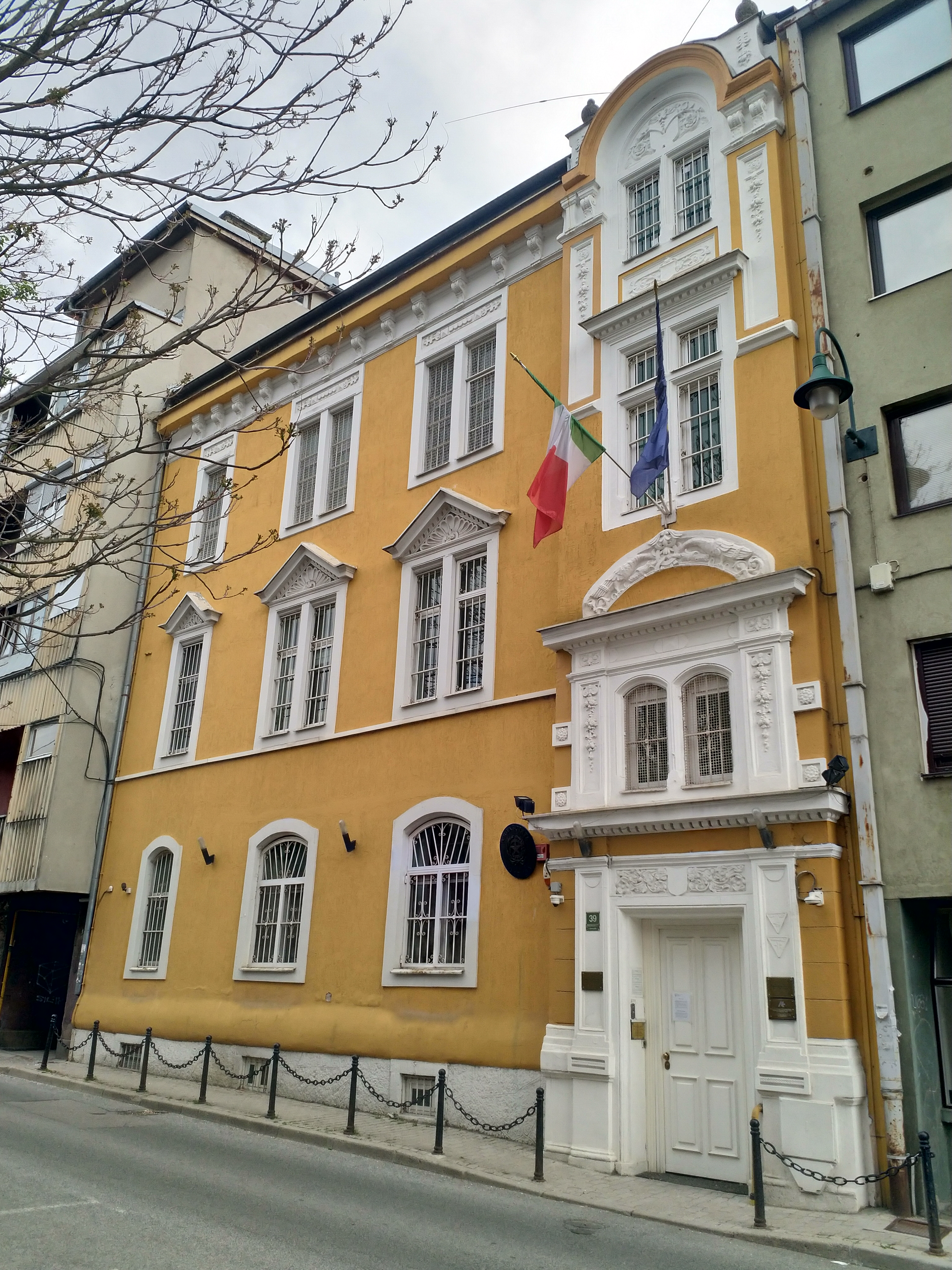
- Italian embassy in Čekaluša

- Location within Sarajevo
- Interactive map of Čekaluša street
- Native name: Ulica Čekaluša (Bosnian)
- Former name: Nemanjina street
- Namesake: Rustem-paša “Čegala”
- Location: Sarajevo
- Quarter: Mejtaš, Bjelave, Koševo I, Park
- Nearest metro station: Centar Municipality
- Coordinates: 43.862163119566894°N 18.416897566003726°E
- East: Mejtaš square

Designations

KONS of Bosnia and Herzegovina
- Official name: Čekaluša ulica (dio Čekaluša ulice od ulice Mejtaš do ulice Džidžikovac)
- Type: Category II monument
- Criteria: II. Value; A, C ii.iii., D v., F ii., G i.iii.v., I i.ii.
- Designated: 20 June 2016 (3rd session (new convocation))
- Part of: -
- Reference no.: 3767
- Decision no.: 07.3-2.3-58/16-10
- Listed: List of National Monuments of Bosnia and Herzegovina
- Operator: -

Čekaluša street is one of the main streets in Sarajevo, the capital of Bosnia and Herzegovina. The street is located in the municipality of Centar.

Part of the Čekaluša street, between Mejtaš and Džidžikovac streets, was inscribed by the Commission to Preserve National Monuments onto the list of National Monuments of Bosnia and Herzegovina, on 20 June 2016.

== Significant buildings ==
A significant buildings and institutions located in this street are as follows:

- Faculty of Dental Medicine
- Faculty of Pharmacy
- Faculty of Medicine
- Čekaluša Mosque
- Italian Embassy
