= Mladen Mitić =

Bosnian guitarist

- Born: Sarajevo, SR Bosnia and Herzegovina, SFR Yugoslavia
- Other names: Munja; Mitke
- Occupation: Musician
- Years active: 1980–present
- Musical career
- Genres: New Primitivism; Rock; Garage rock
- Instruments: Bass guitar; vocals

Mladen Mitić, known by his nickname Munja, is a Bosnian guitarist. He first found mainstream success as an original lineup member of a Bosnian garage rock band Zabranjeno Pušenje.

== Career ==
Mitić joined a Sarajevo-based garage rock band Zabranjeno Pušenje in fall 1980. He performed on the band's first two studio albums: Das ist Walter (1984) and Dok čekaš sabah sa šejtanom (1985). In 1986, he left the band with some other members.

Mitić has been living in Los Angeles, CA since the 1990s.

== Discography ==
Zabranjeno pušenje

- Das ist Walter (1984)
- Dok čekaš sabah sa šejtanom (1985)
