= No Smoking in Sarajevo =

- Directed by: Gianluca Loffredo; Andrea Postiglione
- Written by: Gianluca Loffredo; Andrea Postiglione
- Produced by: Gildas Nivet; Tristant Guerlotté; Thomas Bouniort; Rafael Bernabeu Garcia; Gianluca Loffredo
- Starring: Davor Sučić; Nenad Janković; Zenit Đozić
- Narrated by: Gianluca Loffredo
- Cinematography: Tristant Guerlotté
- Edited by: Gianluca Loffredo; Tristant Guerlotté
- Music by: Rafael Bernabeu Garcia
- Production companies: Grenouilles Productions; Colibri Film; Chacapa Studio
- Release date: 26 October 2016 (Paris)
- Running time: 75 minutes
- Country: France
- Language: Italian
- Budget: €168,000

No Smoking in Sarajevo is a 2016 French documentary film by Gianluca Loffredo and Andrea Postiglione. The documentary explores the history of rock band Zabranjeno Pušenje (transl. No Smoking) through stories of three founding members; Sejo Sexon, Nele Karajlić and Fudo. The film was released on October 26, 2016, in Paris, France.

On December 21, 2016, the film had its Sarajevo premiere at the 2016 Sarajevo Film Festival. The film won the Jury Award for Best Documentary Film at the 2017 Bosnian-Herzegovinian Film Festival in New York City, NY.

== Synopsis ==
The documentary tells the history of a Yugoslavian rock band through stories of its three first members, Sejo Sexon, Nele Karajlić and Fudo. Their story is emblematic of what happened in socialist Yugoslavia in the last 30 years. The film revisits the time of New Primitivism, famous TV show Top Lista Nadrealista and old concerts of Zabranjeno Pušenje.

== Cast ==
- Davor Sučić, a.k.a. Sejo Sexon, guitarist and co-founder of Zabranjeno Pušenje
- Nenad Janković a.k.a. Nele Karajlić, vocalist and co-founder of Zabranjeno Pušenje
- Zenit Đozić a.k.a. Fudo, drummer and co-founder of Zabranjeno Pušenje
