= Ognjen Gajić =

- Born: 1963 (age 62–63); Sarajevo, Yugoslavia
- Education: University of Sarajevo (MD); Brown University Medical School; Mayo Clinic College of Medicine and Science (MSc)
- Occupations: physician; university professor; musician
- Years active: 1980–1987 (musician); 1987–present (physician)
- Employer: Mayo Clinic
- Medical career
- Profession: Doctor; Professor of Medicine
- Field: Pulmonologist; intensive care physician
- Institutions: Rhode Island Hospital; New York Methodist Hospital; Mayo Clinic
- Notable works: Tidal volume; Transfusion-related acute lung injury
- Musical career
- Genres: New Primitivism; Rock; Garage Rock
- Instruments: Saxophone; flute; keyboards
- Labels: Diskoton; Jugoton

Ognjen Gajić (born 1963), is a Bosnian–American intensive care physician, pulmonologist, university professor and a former musician. He serves as a Clinical Informaticist and a Critical Care Specialist of the Pulmonary Medicine Department at the Mayo Clinic in Rochester, Minnesota. and as a professor of medicine at the Mayo Clinic School of Medicine. He first found mainstream success as a member of the original lineup of a Bosnian rock band Zabranjeno Pušenje.

== Medical career ==
Gajić received his medical degree from University of Sarajevo Faculty of Medicine in 1987. He earned his master's degree in clinical research from the Mayo Clinic College of Medicine and Science in 2004. Also, a specialization and postgraduate training has been done at the Pediatric Surgery of the Sarajevo University Clinical Center (1994), at the Department of Surgery, Division of Pediatric Surgery of Rhode Island Hospital, Brown University Medical School, and at New York Methodist Hospital.

=== Awards, honors and recognition ===
Selected awards and honors.

- 2012 Fellow (FCCM) in Critical Care Medicine by American College of Critical Care Medicine
- 2012 Epidemiology and Outcomes Specialty Award by Society of Critical Care Medicine
- 2012 Exemplary mentor in the positive development of junior colleagues in the profession by The Quality of Life Research Center, Claremont Graduate University
- 2008 Epidemiology and Outcomes Specialty Award by Society of Critical Care Medicine
- 2007 CHEST Meeting – Best Poster Award by American College of Chest Physicians
- 2006 Presidential Citation, Critical Care Assembly by American Thoracic Society
- 2002 Dr. Ralph and Marian C. Falk Trust Grant to advance promising clinical research careers by Mayo Foundation
- 2000 Outstanding Fellow Teacher Award and 2001 Academic Clinician Award; by Mayo Clinic College of Medicine and Science
- 1998 & 1999 Best Resident and 1999 Outstanding Research Award; by New York Methodist Hospital
- 1987 Hasan Brkic Award for Outstanding Achievement in Medical School by University of Sarajevo

== Musical career ==
What would eventually become Zabranjeno Pušenje was started in 1979 by Nenad Janković and Davor Sučić, two teenage friends and neighbors who lived in the same apartment building on the Fuad Midžić Street in the Sarajevo neighborhood of Koševo. Two of them expanded their setup by adding Gajić, who was also a neighborhood teenage friend who possessed some basic musical knowledge having attended a music school. Though, by Janković's own admission, Gajić played the piano better than him, Gajić decided to switch over to flute as an homage to his favorite band Jethro Tull. He managed to become comfortable on a new instrument fairly quickly, soon becoming a bit of a musical authority among this now three-piece. Gajić performed with Zabranjeno Pušenje around Sarajevo for two years before beginning to record material for a debut album during fall 1983. The shambolic recording process took seven months before the album named Das ist Walter got released by Jugoton in April 1984 in the small print of 3,000 copies, clearly indicative of the label's extremely low commercial expectations. Though the album was initially released in the small print, the final count was 100,000 copies sold, setting a record for exceeding the initial release by 30 times. In Autumn 1984, they embarked on a 60-concert nationwide concert tour, making them one of the biggest Yugoslav rock attractions after just one album. In the mid-1980s Gajić worked on two more album. The second studio album Dok čekaš sabah sa šejtanom (English: While you're awaiting dawn with the devil) is released through Jugoton on June 11, 1985, and the third Pozdrav iz zemlje Safari (transl. Greetings from the land of Safari) is released through his hometown based record label Diskoton in 1987. He left the band in 1987.

=== Zabranjeno Pušenje Discography ===
- Das ist Walter (1984)
- Dok čekaš sabah sa šejtanom (1985)
- Pozdrav iz zemlje Safari (1987)

== Personal life ==
Gajić was born and raised in Sarajevo, Yugoslavia (present-day Bosnia and Herzegovina). He left Sarajevo in 1994, during the Bosnian War.

Gajić is an active member of the Bosnian-Herzegovinian American Academy of Arts and Sciences (BHAAAS).
