= Predrag Rakić =

Bosnian drummer

- Born: Sarajevo, SR Bosnia and Herzegovina, SFR Yugoslavia
- Other names: Šeki; Šeki Gayton
- Occupations: Musician; music manager
- Years active: 1983–present
- Musical career
- Genres: New Primitivism; Rock; Garage rock
- Instruments: Drums; congas; vocals
- Labels: Diskoton; Jugoton
- Formerly of: Zabranjeno Pušenje

Predrag Rakić, known by his nickname Šeki, is a Bosnian drummer and music manager. He first found mainstream success as an original lineup member of a Bosnian garage rock band Zabranjeno Pušenje.

== Career ==
Rakić joined a Sarajevo-based garage rock band Zabranjeno Pušenje in 1983. He performed on the band's first two studio albums: Das ist Walter (1984) and Dok čekaš sabah sa šejtanom (1985). In 1986, he left the band with some other members.

Rakić performed on the Uhuhu's only studio album which bears the band's name. It was released in 1988.

In 1989, joined a Slovenian rock band Sokoli. He contributed on all their releases; Bitka za ranjence (1989), Marija pomagaj (1990), and Satan je blazn zmatran (1992). Shortly after the release of the 1990 album, Rakić parted ways with the band. In 1992, he appeared on their third studio album as a guest musician.

Rakić lives and works in Slovenia.

== Discography ==
Zabranjeno pušenje

- Das ist Walter (1984)
- Dok čekaš sabah sa šejtanom (1985)
