= The Bridge (1969 film) =

Yugoslav war film directed by Hajrudin Krvavac

- Serbo-Croatian: Most
- Directed by: Hajrudin Krvavac
- Written by: Đorđe Lebović; Predrag Golubović
- Produced by: Iso Tauber
- Starring: Bata Živojinović; Slobodan Perović; Boris Dvornik; Igor Galo; Relja Bašić
- Cinematography: Ognjen Milićević
- Edited by: Blanka Jević
- Music by: Bojan Adamič
- Production company: Bosna Film
- Release date: 14 July 1969
- Running time: 105 min.
- Country: Yugoslavia
- Language: Serbo-Croatian

The Bridge (Serbo-Croatian: Most / Мост) is a 1969 Yugoslav Partisan film directed by Hajrudin Krvavac about the Đurđevića Tara Bridge. It stars Velimir "Bata" Živojinović, Slobodan Perović, Boris Dvornik and Igor Galo.

Similarly to Walter Defends Sarajevo, this film was also popular in the People's Republic of China.

== Plot ==
In 1944, Standartenführer Hoffmann is assigned as extra security for a vital bridge near the Yugoslav border with Greece as German forces are pulling out of the latter country. He wants to take a proactive approach towards Yugoslav Partisan threats but Oberst von Felsen, whom Hoffman is reinforcing, disagrees.

Meanwhile, the Partisans want to destroy the bridge to prevent German troops from entering and foiling a planned operation with 5,000 men. A Partisan officer nicknamed Tiger is tasked with destroying the bridge in seven days. From the Partisans, he recruits an assassin nicknamed Tihi, a young fighter nicknamed Bambino, and Zavatoni, a Sardinian demolitions expert and Bambino's mentor.

The group recruit Mane, a shady contractor who leads them to the home of the Engineer who designed the bridge, which is too sturdy to be demolished without intricate knowledge of its structure. They rescue him from Gestapo agents, but the Engineer has to be forced to go with them when he learns their plan. At the meeting point to pick up their last member, they instead find his sister Jelena, who tells them her brother was captured. They are forced to leave together when a German patrol finds them. While escaping in wetlands, the Engineer attempts to flee, but realizes the Germans will kill him. Bambino is wounded flanking their pursuers. Unable to save Bambino, Zavatoni kills him and the rest of the Germans with dynamite.

However, they are soon captured by another patrol under Obersturmführer Kautz. Just before their execution by firing squad, Kautz guns down the other soldiers and says that he is with the Partisans. Using German uniforms and a truck, they are able to get closer to the bridge. They stop at the home of one of Mane's contacts to find out where the explosives for the mission are stored and to update their superiors. Unbeknownst to the group, the message is intercepted by the Germans and the contact is killed that night. The following day, Hoffman's troops attack the home and find a message left by a mole in the group revealing the location of the explosives. Hoffman is able to secure the explosives cache at a nearby convent before Tiger's group, but is unable to stop a nun from warning them about the ambush.

Desperate, the group tries to weed out the mole, mostly blaming Jelena. Kautz offers to try and find other explosives, but is revealed to have been following Hoffman's orders. He leads German soldiers back to the group, but his troops are ambushed and he is captured. Tiger tells him that he only told Kautz the exact time of their radio transmission, which uncovered him as the traitor. Using the stolen German uniforms and truck, they infiltrate the German camp by the bridge, retrieve the explosives, and force Hoffman at gunpoint to call the troops to an assembly. The Engineer has a change of heart and tells Zavatoni where to plant the explosives. Von Felsen is suspicious, but has to leave and meet the General in charge of the retreating forces to guide them over the bridge.

An unanswered phone call blows the Partisans' cover and Mane is killed. Tiger kills Kautz on the bridge, but Zavatoni is killed before he can trigger the explosion. The Engineer runs onto the bridge, pursued by a freed Hoffman, and uses the detonator to blow up the bridge before the retreating Germans can cross. Survivors on both sides lament that such a beautiful bridge had been destroyed.

== Cast ==
- Velimir "Bata" Živojinović as Major Tiger
- Slobodan Perović as the Engineer
- Boris Dvornik as Giuseppe Zavatoni
- Relja Bašić as Sova / Obersturmführer Kautz
- Sibina Mijatović as Jelena
- Boro Begović as Tihi ("Silent")
- Jovan Janićijević Burduš as Mane Švercer ("Smuggler")
- Igor Galo as Bambino ("Kid")
- Wilhelm Koch-Hooge as Oberst Mark von Felsen
- Hannjo Hasse as Standartenführer Hoffmann
- Fred Delmare as Private Schmidt
- Jovan Milićević as Yugoslav Colonel
- Dušan Janićijević as Yugoslav Major
- Demeter Bitenc as Untersturmführer Nimayer
- Maks Furijan as German General
- Veljko Mandić as German NCO
- Slobodan Velimirović as Reinecker (uncredited)
