= Savo Pređa =

Yugoslav partisan general (1921–2005)

Savo Pređa (8 January 1921 — 12 October 2005) was a Serbian Partisan general in World War II and, later, governor of Bileća prison. Pređa was also a director of OZNA for eastern Bosnia for a short period, and, after that, the deputy minister of the interior. He was known for being close to Aleksandar Ranković. Pređa was also the founder of the Yugoslav automobile-motor association. He was one of the leaders of the team that caught Serbian Chetnik leader Draža Mihajlović. Pređa consulted on the script for the movie Walter Defends Sarajevo, that was very popular in former Yugoslavia and China.
