= Dok čekaš sabah sa šejtanom =

Album by Zabranjeno Pušenje

Studio album by Zabranjeno Pušenje
- Released: 11 June 1985
- Recorded: April–May 1985
- Studio: SIM studio, Zagreb, Yugoslavia
- Genre: Garage rock; rock
- Length: 58:55
- Language: Serbo-Croatian
- Label: Jugoton
- Producer: Mahmud Paša Ferović

Zabranjeno Pušenje chronology
Das ist Walter (1984)	Dok čekaš sabah sa šejtanom (1985)	Pozdrav iz zemlje Safari (1987)

Dok čekaš sabah sa šejtanom (transl. While Waiting on Sunrise with Shaitan) is the second studio album by Yugoslav band Zabranjeno Pušenje released on June 11, 1985. It was released through Jugoton in SFR Yugoslavia. It is the band's first double album.

Following the unexpected success of their debut album Das ist Walter (which sold more than 100,000 copies), the band's sophomore studio effort was somewhat of a commercial disappointment, selling just over 30,000 copies in Yugoslavia.

The album was re-released in 2000 by Croatia Records.

== Background ==
During the Das ist Walter promotional tour, at their concert in Rijeka on November 27, 1984, Nele Karajlić declared, referring to an amplifier that had just broken down, "Crk'o Maršal. Mislim na pojačalo." (English: The Marshall croaked. I mean, the amplifier.), which was recognized as a pun on Marshal Tito's death, landing the band in trouble. They were criticized by the media and a campaign against them resulted in the canceling of their concerts and the removal of Top lista nadrealista from the air. The affair got attention of the Yugoslav Security Administration (UDBA), as well. They were defended by some leading liberal intellectuals, and magazines such as Polet, Mladina and Slobodna Dalmacija, who raised their voices in favour of the group members, so the affair ended up without prison sentences.

In this atmosphere, the band recorded their this double album Dok čekaš sabah sa šejtanom in the infamous SIM studio and released it in July 1985. The album has received widespread acclaim from critics, but was boycotted by the media.

== Promotional tour ==
The promotional tour had extreme difficulties due to concern of the concert hosts and the enormous presence of the state police, as a reflection of the Marshall affair. Despite several top concerts such as at Pionir Hall in Belgrade, Poljud in Split or Dom Sportova in Zagreb, tens of thousands sold tickets, the tour had a rather disappointing conclusion as the following year Šeki Gayton and Mustafa Čengić left the band in search of a more secure means of making a living. Mladen Mitić left in late 1986 after contributing to the development of the third album.

== Track listing ==
Side A
No.	Title	Writer(s)	Arranger(s)	Length
1.	"Stanje šoka"	Davor Sučić	Sučić; Dražen Janković	3:10
2.	"Djevojčice kojima miriše koža"	Sučić; D. Janković	Sučić; D. Janković	3:51
3.	"Lutka sa naslovne strane"	Sučić	Sučić	3:32
4.	"Dok čekaš sabah sa šejtanom"	Sučić	Sučić; D. Janković	4:43

Side B
No.	Title	Writer(s)	Arranger(s)	Length
1.	"Dok jezdiš ka Alemanji"	Sučić; D. Janković	Sučić; D. Janković	3:07
2.	"Ibro dirka"	Sučić; N. Janković	Sučić; D. Janković	3:20
3.	"Kuhinja"	Sučić	Sučić	3:20
4.	"Ne Me Quitte Pas"	Jacques Brel; Zenit Đozić		0:10
5.	"Učini da budem vuk"	Sučić; Nenad Janković; Mladen Mitić	Sučić; D. Janković	3:40
6.	"Baš Čelik (Prvi Dio)"	Sučić; Jure Kaštelan	Sučić; N. Janković	2:25

Side C
No.	Title	Writer(s)	Arranger(s)	Length
1.	"Brut"	Sučić; Mirko Srdić	Sučić; D. Janković	2:29
2.	"Radost prvog žita"	Sučić; Ognjen Gajić	Sučić	3:34
3.	"Ujka Sam"	Sučić; N. Janković	Sučić; N. Janković	3:40
4.	"Nedelja kada je otišao Hase"	N. Janković	Sučić	4:07

Side D
No.	Title	Writer(s)	Arranger(s)	Length
1.	"Sanjao sam noćas da te imam"	Sučić; Srdić	Sučić	3:31
2.	"Kažu mi da novog frajera imaš"	Sučić; Srdić	Sučić; D. Janković	3:42
3.	"Gospođa Brams"	Sučić	Sučić; D. Janković	3:41
4.	"Baš Čelik (Drugi Dio)"	Sučić; Kaštelan	Sučić; D. Janković	2:43

== Personnel ==
Credits adapted from the album's liner notes.

Zabranjeno pušenje

- Mladen Mitić Munja – bass, backing vocals
- Predrag Rakić Šeki – drums
- Mustafa Čengić Mujo – solo guitar, backing vocals
- Ognjen Gajić – saxophone, flute, keyboards
- Zenit Đozić – congas, backing vocals
- Sejo Sexon – rhythm guitar
- Nele Karajlić – lead vocals
- Seid Karajlić – keyboards

Additional musicians

- Stanko Juzbašić – synthesizer (tracks B6, D4)
- Senad Galijašević (credited as Senad od Bosne) – backing vocals (tracks B6, D4)

Production

- Mahmut Paša Ferović – production
- Vladimir Smolec – sound engineering
- Dragan Čačinović Čač – recording

Design

- Srđan Velimirović – design
- Elvedin Kantardžić – photos
