= Vladimir Perić =

Yugoslav partisan

- Владимир Перић
- Born: 28 December 1919; Prijepolje, Kingdom of Serbs, Croats and Slovenes
- Died: 5/6 April 1945 (aged 25); Sarajevo, Democratic Federal Yugoslavia
- Military career
- Allegiance: (Democratic Federal Yugoslavia) Yugoslav Partisans (1941–1945)
- Service years: 1941–1945
- Nickname: Valter
- Commands: Yugoslav Partisans in Sarajevo
- Conflicts: World War II in Yugoslavia Spanish Civil War
- Awards: Order of the People's Hero

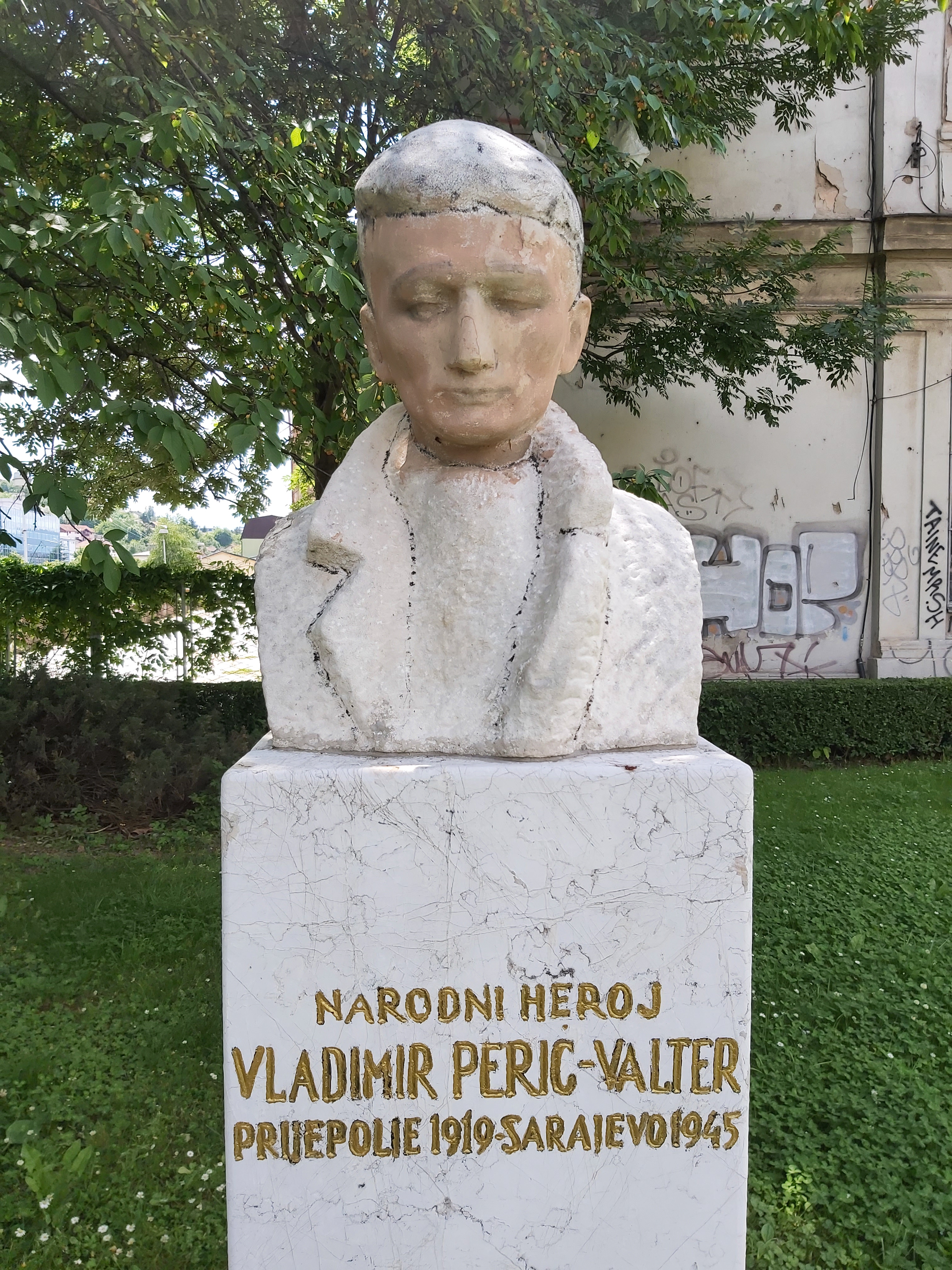
Vladimir Perić bust in Sarajevo.

Vladimir Perić (Serbian Cyrillic: Владимир Перић; 28 December 1919 – 5/6 April 1945), best known by the nom de guerre Valter, was a Yugoslav Partisan commander in German-occupied Sarajevo during World War II.

Born in the Serbian town of Prijepolje, he became a member of the Communist Party of Yugoslavia (KPJ) in 1940. The following year, he joined the Partisans and was appointed deputy political commissar of a Partisan unit in eastern Bosnia in 1942. In 1943, Perić became secretary of the Sarajevo committee of the KPJ and took charge of anti-sabotage actions in the city in early 1945. While visiting a tobacco factory at midnight on 5–6 April, Perić was killed after a German soldier hurled a hand grenade at him. His death made him one of the last Sarajevans killed in World War II.

== Early life ==
Vladimir Perić was born in the town of Prijepolje on 28 December 1919. He graduated from a trade school in his hometown and moved to Belgrade to attend business school. His school years were characterized by constant poverty and he struggled to find work to pay for his education. From 1938 to 1940, Perić worked at the State Mortgage Bank of Yugoslavia in Belgrade. In 1940, he became a member of the Communist Party of Yugoslavia (Serbo-Croatian: Komunistička partija Jugoslavije; KPJ). Shortly afterwards, he was transferred to the bank's Sarajevo branch.

== World War II ==
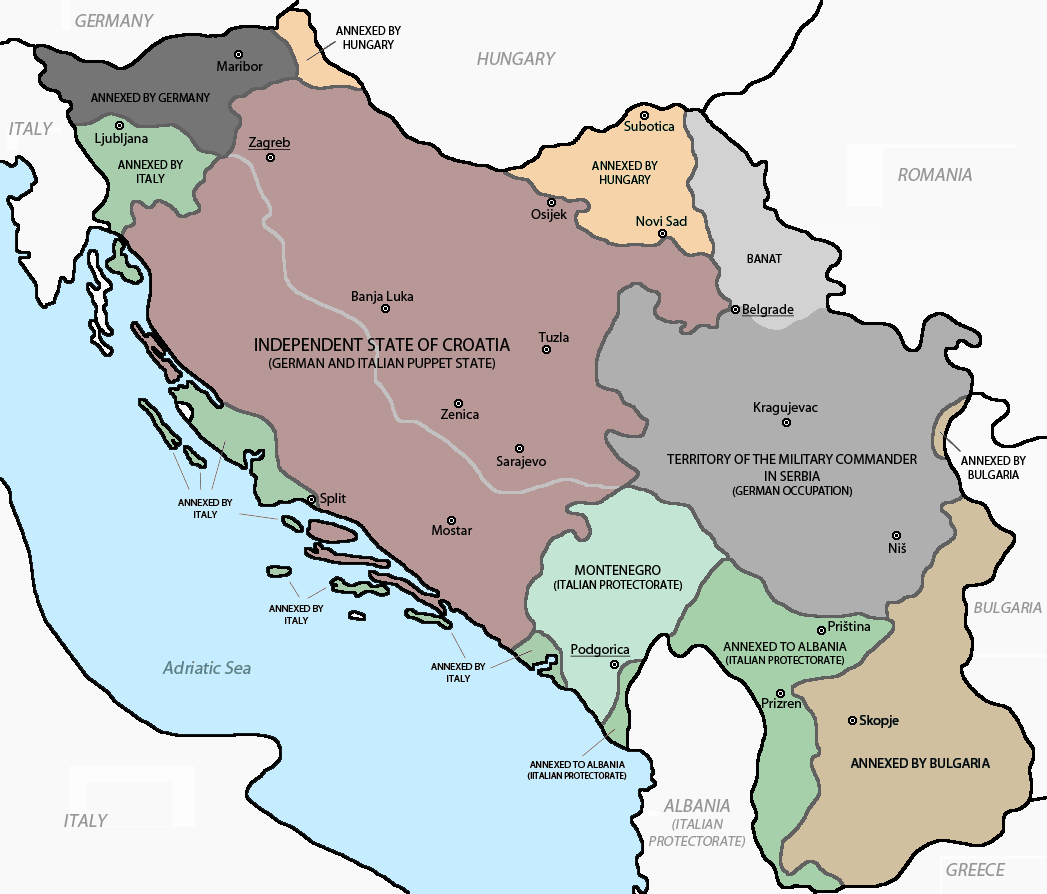
A map showing the Axis occupation of Yugoslavia from 1941 to 1943.

On 6 April 1941, Axis forces invaded Yugoslavia. Poorly equipped and poorly trained, the Royal Yugoslav Army was quickly defeated. After the invasion, Yugoslavia was dismembered, with the extreme Croat nationalist and fascist Ante Pavelić, who had been in exile in Benito Mussolini's Italy, being appointed Poglavnik (leader) of an Ustaše-led Croatian state – the Independent State of Croatia (often called the NDH, from the Croatian: Nezavisna Država Hrvatska). The NDH combined almost all of modern-day Croatia, all of modern-day Bosnia and Herzegovina and parts of modern-day Serbia into an "Italian-German quasi-protectorate." NDH authorities, led by the Ustaše militia, subsequently implemented genocidal policies against the Serb, Jewish and Romani population living within the borders of the new state. As a result, two resistance movements emerged – the royalist and Serb Chetniks, led by Colonel Draža Mihailović, and the multi-ethnic, Communist Yugoslav Partisans, led by Josip Broz Tito.

Perić was only twenty-one years old when the war began. Having become a member of the KPJ before the war, he immediately joined the Partisans. In the spring of 1941, he and other members of the KPJ participated in planning underground resistance operations. Later that year, he and other members of the party appealed for wealthy citizens of Sarajevo to provide food and money to the city's beleaguered Jewish community. As the war progressed, Perić came to be known by the codename Valter. In 1942, Perić participated in actions against German forces in Zenica. That year, he was appointed deputy political commissar of a Partisan unit in eastern Bosnia, holding that position until the following year, when he participated in Partisan actions against German troops in the city of Tuzla. That year, regional leaders named him secretary of the Sarajevo committee of the KPJ, giving him the task of reconstituting the party's organization in the city. Perić responded by encouraging the Partisans to recruit in urban areas and reconstructed the KPJ to increase its support for the Partisans by providing further personnel, supplies and intelligence.

In June 1944, Perić took on the role of directing the formation, training and deployment of Partisan strike groups (known as "fivesomes", or Petorke) operating in Sarajevo and its outskirts.

=== Death ===
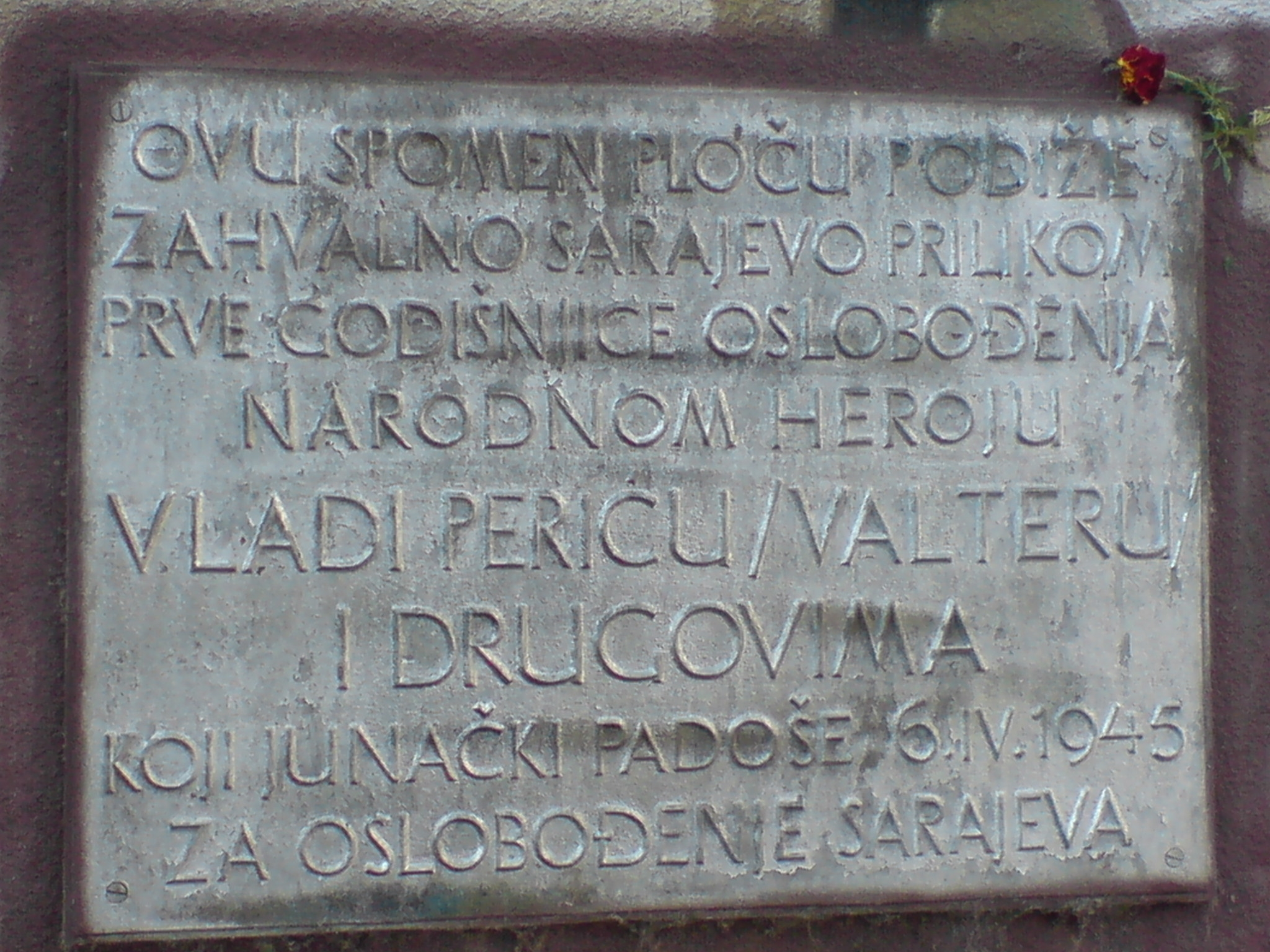
Plaque in Sarajevo dedicated to Perić.

The liberation of Sarajevo was organized by a powerful network of underground anti-German movements led by Perić. By early 1945 the Partisans engaged in a campaign against German saboteurs, with Perić being personally responsible for anti-sabotage actions in Sarajevo. In early April, he visited the city's main post office and electrical generating plant to ensure that they had not been sabotaged by withdrawing German forces. While visiting a tobacco factory at midnight on 5–6 April, Perić was killed after a German soldier hurtled a hand grenade at him. Perić's death made him one of the last Sarajevans killed in World War II. At around the same time as his death, most German soldiers in Sarajevo had either left the city or were captured by the Partisans. On 9 April the KPJ formed a new local committee in Sarajevo, appointing new members to take the places left behind by Perić and other operatives killed while fighting the Germans in the previous week. On April 9 Perić was buried in mass funeral for all the Partisans and Communist operatives killed in operations for the city liberation previous couple of days. Commemoration lasted for two whole days, continuing on April 10, one in honor of Valter attracted more than 15 thousand people.

== Legacy ==
The Partisan film Walter Defends Sarajevo (Serbo-Croatian: Valter brani Sarajevo), released in 1972, is a fictionalized portrayal of Perić's activities during World War II which ends with a statement in favour of unity when a SS officer realizes at the end of the movie that he was fighting not just a single partisan but an entire city ("You see that city? That's Walter!"). In 1992, anti-nationalist and anti-war demonstrators in Sarajevo evoked Perić's memory as a sign of inter-ethnic tolerance prior to the outbreak of the Bosnian War; demonstrators bore stickers that read "I am Walter" and one anti-war movement was even named after Perić. In the Bosnian hit television comedy series Konak kod Hilmije, Perić was portrayed in a comedic way by Serbian actor Bojan Perić. Several iconic moments, characters and lines from the movie were featured in said television series as well.
