= Walter Defends Sarajevo =

1972 film by Hajrudin Krvavac

Valter brani Sarajevo
- Film poster
- Directed by: Hajrudin Krvavac
- Written by: Đorđe Lebović (main writer); Hajrudin Krvavac; Savo Pređa
- Produced by: Petar Sobajić
- Starring: Bata Živojinović; Ljubiša Samardžić; Rade Marković
- Cinematography: Miroljub Dikosavljević
- Edited by: Jelena Bjenjaš
- Music by: Bojan Adamič
- Production company: Bosna Film
- Release date: 12 April 1972 (Yugoslavia)
- Running time: 133 minutes
- Country: Bosnia
- Languages: Bosnian; German

Walter Defends Sarajevo is a 1972 Yugoslavian film directed by Hajrudin Krvavac and starring Bata Živojinović, Ljubiša Samardžić and Rade Marković. The film centers around a mysterious figure named 'Walter', who is actively disrupting the attempts of German commander Alexander Löhr to retreat from the Balkans. The film's eponymous character, Walter, is loosely based around Vladimir Perić, whose nom de guerre was 'Valter'.

== Plot ==
In late 1944, as the end of World War II approaches, the Wehrmacht's high command determines to pull out General Alexander Löhr's Army Group E from the Balkans back to Germany. They plan to supply the tank columns with fuel from a depot in Sarajevo. The Yugoslav partisans' leader in the city, a mysterious man known as Walter, presents a grave danger to the operation's success, and the Germans dispatch Standartenführer von Dietrich of the SD to deal with him. As no one in the city seems to know what Walter even looks like, Dietrich manages to have an operative infiltrate the resistance under the guise of Walter himself. The partisans are caught in a deadly game of betrayal, fraud and imposture while trying to frustrate the Germans' plans.

=== Ending ===
At the end of the movie, von Dietrich muses that he has finally realised why he never managed to defeat his nemesis Walter; standing on a hill he points at Sarajevo below and remarks in German: Sehen Sie diese Stadt? Das ist Walter! ("You see that city? That's Walter!") This was intended to send a message of unity consistent with the official politics of the multi-ethnic state of Yugoslavia.

== Cast ==
- Bata Živojinović as Pilot (Walter)
- Ljubiša Samardžić as Zis
- Rade Marković as Sead Kapetanović
- Slobodan Dimitrijević as Suri
- Neda Spasojević as Mirna
- Dragomir Gidra Bojanić as Kondor
- Pavle Vuisić as train dispatcher
- Faruk Begolli as Branko
- Stevo Žigon as Dr Mišković
- Jovan Janićijević as Josic
- Relja Bašić as Obersturmführer
- Hannjo Hasse as Col. von Dietrich
- Rolf Römer as SS-Hauptsturmführer Bischoff
- Fred Delmare as Sgt. Edele (credited as Axel Delmare)
- Herbert Köfer as German general
- Wilhelm Koch-Hooge as Lieutenant Colonel Hagen
- Helmut Schreiber as Lieutenant Colonel Weiland
- Emir Kusturica as a young man

== Production ==
Although not aiming to reflect history, the film's leading character was named after the partisan leader Vladimir Perić, known by his nom de guerre 'Walter', who commanded a resistance group in Sarajevo from 1943 until his death in the battle to liberate the city on April 6, 1945. Hajrudin Krvavac dedicated the picture to the people of Sarajevo and their heroism during the war. Reflecting the theme of "brotherhood and unity", the film shows all the three main ethnic groups in Bosnia-Herzegovina, namely the Bosnians, the Serbs, and the Croatians all working together in the Partisans to resist Nazi Germany. The film marked the beginning of Emir Kusturica's career as it was his first appearance in a major motion picture in a small role playing a young communist activist.

== Release ==
The film premiered in Sarajevo on Wednesday, 12 April 1972 in front of 5,000 spectators at the recently built Skenderija Hall. The venue thus hosted another lavish partisan film première, two and a half years after Veljko Bulajić's Battle of Neretva premiered in October 1969. Marshal Josip Broz Tito was not in attendance this time, though the premiere still saw its share of Yugoslav celebrities and functionaries including the film's cast as well as the Red Star Belgrade head coach Miljan Miljanić, actress Špela Rozin, Skenderija's director and former Sarajevo mayor Ljubo Kojo, Bosna Film chairman Neđo Parežanin, etc.

== Analysis ==
Walter Defends Sarajevo belonged to a genre of films known as the Partisan film, which were popular in Yugoslavia in the 1960s and 1970s. Most Partisan films tended to focus on the collective with a couple of Partisan characters serving as the joint protagonists rather than having a single protagonist. The Partisans were depicted in these films as narodni heroji ("people's heroes") who came from every ethnic group in Yugoslavia; were a mixture of workers, peasants and intellectuals; and included a number of both men and women. The depiction of the narodni heroji was intended to give the message that virtually everyone in Yugoslavia had supported the Partisans in the "People's Liberation War" as the war was called in Yugoslavia. Walter Defends Sarajevo was unusual in the Partisan film genre in having a single protagonist. Walter played by the highly "charismatic" Serb stunt man turned actor Bata Živojinović was the most efficient character with regards to killing Germans in the Partisan films as Walter killed 42 Germans over the course of the film. In terms of a body count, Walter was the most successful Partisan cinematic character ever depicted. Likewise, Walter Defends Sarajevo was unusual in being set in a city instead of the countryside as the Partisan films usually were. The majority of the guerrilla war in Yugoslavia was fought in the mountains and forests, hence the tendency of the Partisan films to be set against the backdrop of mountains and forests. The city of Sarajevo served as a virtual character in the film as Krvavac made much use of the narrow labyrinthine streets of Sarajevo dating back from the Ottoman era to provide an atmospheric settling. Two of Sarajevo's most prominent landmarks, namely the Old Orthodox Church and the Emperor's Mosque feature in the film.

One tradition in the Partisan film that Walter Defends Sarajevo followed was a narrator relating the previous events prior to the film and the use of stock footage from World War Two of the Wehrmacht overrunning Yugoslavia in April 1941 along footage of the ruins of Belgrade after the devastating Luftwaffe bombing raid of 6 April 1941 at the beginning of the film. The mélange of stock footage was intended to show that the film was grounded in history; that the Wehrmacht was a highly formidable foe; the failures of the Kingdom of Yugoslavia to defend its people; and the cruelty and ruthlessness of the Nazis. Likewise, when the film proper begins, it follows another tradition of the Partisan films where a group of Wehrmacht and SS officers meet to discuss their plans to crush the Partisans. Walter is shown as being supported by all of the people of Sarajevo and has Serb, Croat and Bosnian Muslim sidekicks to assist him, which followed the standard trope of the Partisan film genre in stressing the multi-ethnic character of the Partisans. Most notably, Walter's own ethnicity is never stated in the film, making him a stand-in for Yugoslavia itself. The Spanish historian Mercedes Camino described Walter Defends Sarajevo as being more like a spy film or an urban thriller instead of the war films that the Partisan films are usually allocated under. Camino wrote the mood of the film owned much to the style of film noir with scenes set at night with atmospheric lighting that cast long shadows, which gave the message that Walter operated in a dark, dangerous world. The climactic fight atop of a moving train has been described as an action scene equal to any action sequence in a Hollywood film. The film is much beloved in Sarajevo, and the character of Walter is often invoked as a symbol of Sarajevo along with the line from the German officer pointing down at Sarajevo "das ist Walter!" The American historian Robert Donia wrote: "Valter brani Sarajevo undoubtedly overstated the universality of Partisan resistance, but it aptly captured the indefatigable determination and remarkable resilience of the Communist-led resistance fighters who harassed Sarajevo's occupiers during the war and aided in driving them from the city in 1945. Vladimir Perić-Valter became Sarajevo's embodiment of the postwar Partisan memorial culture that flourished in Yugoslavia during the socialist period." Donia noted that in Communist Yugoslavia the standard narrative of remembering the war was that all of the peoples of Yugoslavia were more or less equally victims of fascism, which was reflected in Walter Defends Sarajevo. However, Donia noted that this way of presenting history was not in fact true as 70% of Sarajevans who were killed during the German occupation in 1941-1945 came from Sarajevo's Jewish community, which was almost wiped out, and the remaining 30% of the victims came from the other ethnic groups in Sarajevo.

== Reception ==
Walter Defends Sarajevo received a favorable response from the Yugoslav audience, especially in Sarajevo itself.

The film was distributed in sixty countries, and achieved its greatest success in the People's Republic of China, becoming the country's most popular foreign film in the 1970s, being viewed by an estimated 300 million people in the year of its release. Owing mainly to the Chinese audience, Walter Defends Sarajevo is one of the most watched war films of all time. During the Great Proletarian Cultural Revolution (1966–1969), film production almost ceased in China while foreign films were banned.

Mao Zedong had supported Stalin in the Tito-Stalin split of 1948 and had long denounced Marshal Josip Broz Tito as a "revisionist" who had abandoned Communism. After Tito embarked upon his policy of "market socialism" in 1964, which created a hybrid system that allowed communism and capitalism to co-exist in Yugoslavia (through the League of Communists remained the only legal party), Mao's attacks on Tito's "revisionism" became especially vituperative. Adding to the bitterness of Mao's attacks on Tito was the fact that certain figures in the Chinese Communist Party were interested in Tito's "market socialism" as a model for China. After the Sino-Soviet war of 1969, Mao's attitude towards Tito changed, and Yugoslavia became in China a model of a communist nation that had defied the Soviet Union. The improved Sino-Yugoslav relations after 1969 led to cultural exchanges such as releasing Yugoslav films in China. When Walter Defends Sarajevo was released in China in 1973, it was the first film that many Chinese had seen in years. The American journalist Mathew Scott wrote that Walter Defends Sarajevo offered Chinese audiences what their own films did not at the time, namely "complex characters, exotic locations, and set-piece action sequences." The preferred film genre under Mao Zedong had been film adaptations of the "model operas", dialectical musicals with one dimensional characters that preached class struggle and Chinese nationalism. From 1966 to 1976, the Chinese film industry was under the control of Mao's politically powerful wife, Jiang Qing, a former actress who was very much interested in cinema. All of the Chinese films produced in the decade from 1966 to 1976 reflected her tastes. One Chinese man, Zhong Li, told Scott in 2022 about seeing Walter Defends Sarajevo in 1973: "It was unlike any film any of us had seen. It showed us another side to the world." One Chinese critic noted that in the "revolutionary operas" the heroes all looked the same, being attractive, self-confident and dressed as workers "whereas in Yugoslav films, ‘good guys’ don’t look like ‘good guys’ and ‘bad guys’ have a positive image. These kinds of non-stereotypical artistic expressions were refreshing to the Chinese people." Walter Defends Sarajevo had its Chinese premiere at the Culture Square cinema in Shanghai and was an instant hit, leading to lengthy line-ups as people waited to see the film. The closing lines in the film "Do you see this city? This is Walter!" has become an iconic line in China that was much quoted. Lu Fei, the actor who dubbed in Zivojinoviċ's voice into Mandarin for the Chinese release of the film became a celebrity in China as he recalled: "Every time I was introduced to others, I was called 'Walter,' and people were always amazed". Wang Xingdong, deputy director of the China Film Association, stated in 2014: "I watched the film five times in a row when it was released in the late 1970s...as a Socialist country, Yugoslav aesthetics for art shared many similarities with China. However, the film stunned me...I still clearly remember one man sitting by me in the cinema who kept murmuring about the Western furniture in the scenes...Though China also produced many revolutionary films, they generally lacked a detailed portrayal of humanity. However, the old Yugoslav films express the conflicts of human nature while conveying strong patriotism."

== Legacy ==
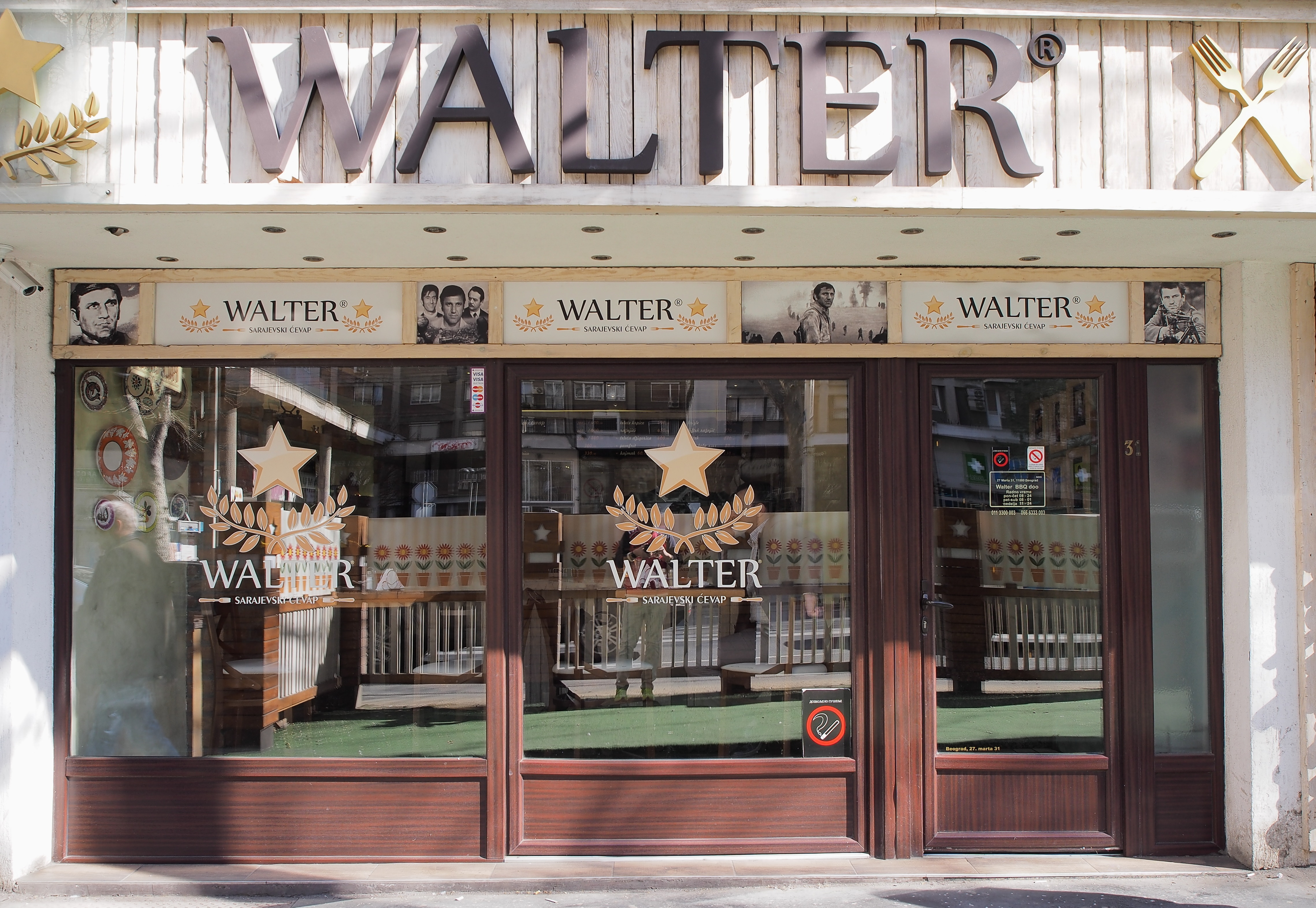
Walter, a restaurant in Belgrade serving Sarajevo-style ćevapi.

The theme of brotherhood and unity within the Yugoslav population in the face of foreign occupation became a point of reference for the New Primitives' punk sub-culture. Zabranjeno Pušenje, one of the movement's leading bands, named their first album Das ist Walter, in honour of the film. Nebojša Jovanović, a Bosnian film historian stated in 2022: "If you are into Yugoslav cinema, you cannot really avoid it. It’s the most quoted Yugoslav film of all time...For the generation here that were in elementary school in the early ’70s to early ’80s, it was sort of a rite of passage to know all the lines from the movie."

In March 1992 as Bosnia-Hercegovina attempted to break away from Yugoslavia, a number of barricades manned by armed men appeared in Sarajevo dividing the city between the Serb neighborhoods and the neighborhoods of the Bosnian Muslims and the Croats. On 3 March 1992, the Bosnian president Alija Izetbegović declared Bosnia-Hercegovina independent of Yugoslavia while Radovan Karadžić, the main Bosnian Serb leader, declared that the Bosnian Serbs would not live as a minority in a Muslim majority state and would break away from Bosnia-Hercegovina to join Serbia. With Bosnia-Hercegovina on the brink of war, Neven Andjelić, the host of the popular Omladinski program ("Youth Program") on Radio Sarajevo, called on 3 March 1992 for protests against the barricades to be called Valter, which was inspired by the film. Andjelić named the protest movement Valter, partly because the character of Walter was identified with Sarajevo and partly because Walter in the film worked with characters from all of Bosnia's ethnic groups, symbolizing unity. The Valter protest movement, which drew much public support, criticised the brinkmanship of Bosnia-Hercegovina's quarreling politicians and the tendency of the Bosnian political parties to have armed para-military wings. The slogan of the Valter movement was "mi smo Valter" (Serbo-Croatian for "We are all Walter"). The Valter protest movement succeeded in having the barricades taken down in Sarajevo and for a moment it appeared that war would be avoided in Bosnia-Hercegovina. However, on 6 April 1992, the Valter protestors marched in front of the Holiday Inn, which served as Karadžić's headquarters and his followers opened fire on the unarmed protestors, an incident that marked the beginning of the Bosnian war.

In mainland China, the movie was so immensely popular that children and streets were named after characters from the film, and a beer brand called 'Walter' was marketed with Velimir Živojinović's picture on the label. As of 2006, it still remains a cult classic in the country. Živojinović became a major star in China and was mobbed by fans whenever he visited that country. The film also continues to remain a mainstay of diplomatic and economic relations between China and the Western Balkans, with Chinese tourists contributing significantly to local tourism industries, and the implementation of visa-free travel between Bosnia and China. Wang Yao, an assistant researcher at the Beijing Film Academy, stated that Walter Defends Sarajevo had a lasting impact on the generation of Chinese filmmakers who started their careers in the 1970s, saying: "Walter’s’ major set-piece battles were the first time many in China had seen pyrotechnics up on the big screen. Certain tropes from the film — the use of codewords, the swapping of uniforms and identities to infiltrate the enemy camp, and gun battles on moving trains — have been adapted by Chinese filmmakers time and time again...You never know who Walter is, who are the good guys and who are the bad guys. The film had a great influence on Chinese film — in everything.”"

The names of numerous hospitality venues throughout the Balkans (mostly in Bosnia and Serbia) have been inspired by the film. In April 2019, the Walter Defends Sarajevo Museum was officially opened in Sarajevo, dedicated to the cultural legacy of the 1972 film and its enduring popularity, particularly in China. The museum features original film props, wartime exhibits, and multimedia installations that contextualize the film within the broader history of Yugoslav cinema and World War II resistance. The museum was opened by the Sarajevo Canton Tourist Board in collaboration with Balkan film enthusiasts and local institutions, aiming to promote both historical education and cinematic heritage.

== See also ==
- Walter Defends Sarajevo Museum
- Cinema of Yugoslavia
- Partisan film

== Bibliography ==
- Camino, Mercedes (2018). Memories of Resistance and the Holocaust on Film. London: Palgrave Macmillan. ISBN 9781137499691.
- Carmichael, Cathie (2015). A Concise History of Bosnia. Cambridge: Cambridge University Press. ISBN 9781107016156.
- Gewirtz, Julien (2017). Unlikely Partners Chinese Reformers, Western Economists, and the Making of Global China. Cambridge: Harvard University Press. ISBN 9780674973473.
- Gocić, Goran (2001). Notes from the Underground: The Cinema of Emir Kusturica. Wallflower Press. ISBN 978-1903364147.
- Donia, Robert J. (2006). Sarajevo: A Biography. University of Michigan Press. ISBN 978-0472115570.
- Levi, Pavle (2007). Disintegration in Frames: Aesthetics and Ideology in the Yugoslav and Post-Yugoslav Cinema. Stanford University Press. ISBN 978-0-8047-5368-5.
- Iordanova, Dina (2006). The Cinema of the Balkans. Wallflower Press. ISBN 978-1904764816.
- Morrison, Kenneth; Lowe, Paul (2021). Reporting the Siege of Sarajevo. London: Bloomsbury Publishing. ISBN 9781350081789.
