= Zenit Đozić =

Bosnian actor, humorist, television producer and former rock drummer

- Born: Zenit Đozić; October 8, 1961 (age 65); Bugojno, PR Bosnia and Herzegovina, FPR Yugoslavia
- Other names: Zena, Fu-Do
- Education: Sarajevo Second Gymnasium
- Occupations: actor; television director; musician
- Years active: 1980–present
- Musical career
- Genres: New Primitivism; Garage Rock
- Instruments: Drums; percussion
- Formerly of: Zabranjeno Pušenje

Zenit Đozić (born 8 October 1961) is a Bosnian actor, humorist, television producer and former rock drummer.

== Career ==
Known under nicknames Zena and Fu-Do, Đozić started his entertainment career as a drummer of Sarajevo-based garage rock band Zabranjeno Pušenje.

He left Zabranjeno Pušenje before the band recorded its first album, but formed Top lista nadrealista with his former bandmates and became one of the most prominent members of the group. He then returned to the group on their second album in back vocal capacity, and did the subsequent tour with them.

He stayed in Sarajevo during the Bosnian War and took part in war-time sketches of Top lista nadrealista.

After the war, he finished the Academy of Performing Arts (ASU) in Sarajevo and then received a master's degree in television production in London. Since 2006, he has been living in Sarajevo and is working as a television producer.

== Discography ==
With Zabranjeno pušenje

- Dok čekaš sabah sa šejtanom (1985)

== See also ==
- No Smoking in Sarajevo
