= The Demolition Squad =

- Directed by: Hajrudin Krvavac
- Starring: Rade Marković; Bata Živojinović
- Release date: 9 February 1968
- Running time: 1h 21min
- Country: Yugoslavia
- Language: Serbo-Croatian

The Demolition Squad (Serbian: Diverzanti) is a 1968 Yugoslav drama film directed by Hajrudin Krvavac.

== Plot ==
The film takes place during World War II and is set in 1943 in the mountains of Bosnia and at an airport. The assembled partisan units are successfully fighting the Germans, but they are powerless against German war planes that are constantly bombing partisan positions. It is decided that the offensive will begin in three days and that the German encirclement should be broken through in order to extract the surrounded partisan units. Their commander sends eight saboteurs with the task of breaking through to the airport and destroying the German planes. The saboteurs know that they are going on an impossible mission, fully aware that the chances of destroying the German planes at the well-guarded airport are minimal, and the chances of getting out alive are almost non-existent.

== Cast ==
- Rade Marković - The Doctor
- Bata Živojinović - Korčagin
- Jovan Janićijević - Gavran
- Ljubiša Samardžić - Šarac
- Husein Čokić - Pavle
- Zdravko Biogradlija - Žarko
- Rastislav Jović - Ivan
- Zaim Muzaferija - Nusret
- Anka Zupanc - Olga
- Janez Vrhovec - Partisan Doctor
- Petar Dobric - Partisan Commander
- Maks Furijan - Oberleutnant
- Rejhan Demirdzic - Leutnant
- Rudi Alvadj - Rottenführer
- Mario Arkus - Train Engineer
