= Mejtaš =

Neighborhood in Sarajevo, Bosnia and Herzegovina

Coordinates: 43°51′41″N 18°25′04″E

Mejtaš (Cyrillic: Мејташ) is a neighbourhood of Bosnia and Herzegovina's capital Sarajevo, where it is located in the center of the city. The neighbourhood has some of the most expensive real estate properties in Sarajevo and it is one of the most prestigious parts in Sarajevo.

The area is close to Sarajevo's Eternal flame memorial.

The neighborhood houses the Black party of Sarajevo.
