= Partisan film =

Yugoslav subgenre of war films

Walter Defends Sarajevo, a 1972 partisan film, has a cult status in the countries of former Yugoslavia, and was seen by 300 million Chinese viewers in the year of its release alone.

Partisan film (Serbo-Croatian: partizanski film / партизански филм) is the name for a subgenre of war films made in Yugoslavia during the 1960s, 1970s and 1980s. In the broadest sense, main characteristics of Partisan films are that they are set in Yugoslavia during World War II and have Yugoslav Partisans as protagonists, while the antagonists are Axis forces and their collaborators. According to Croatian film historian Ivo Škrabalo, Partisan film is "one of the most authentic genres that emerged from the Yugoslav cinema".

== Definition and style ==
Many film critics disagree about the exact definition of the genre. Partisan films are often equated solely with the populist, entertainment-oriented branch of the genre, characterized by epic scope, ensemble casts, expensive production, and emotionally intense scenes, largely introduced into Yugoslav war films by Veljko Bulajić's Kozara (1962). The other branch – which held less appeal to the Communist establishment – was represented by modernist films, ranging from the poetic naturalism of the Yugoslav Black Wave to experimental stream-of-consciousness films.

In his analysis of Fadil Hadžić's The Raid on Drvar (1963), Croatian film critic Jurica Pavičić identifies seven key characteristics of what he calls "super-Partisan films":

- Focus on crucial, well-known, "textbook" examples of Partisan struggle, such as major battles and operations, which are then given an officially sanctioned interpretation.
- Absence of authentic, high-profile figures of Partisan struggle, with the exception of Josip Broz Tito. In Pavičić's view, the rationale for this was to avoid threatening Tito's cult of personality.
- Mosaic structure in which sometimes dozens of characters take part, and their fate is followed throughout the film. These characters represent different classes or walks of life (intellectuals, peasants), or different ethnicities.
- Mixing of the comic with the tragic.
- The presence of foreign (non-Yugoslav) characters as arbiters. Their role is to witness and verify the martyrdom and heroism of Yugoslav peoples as Partisan films depict them, sending a symbolical message ("There it is, the world acknowledges us as we are").
- The characteristic treatment of the Germans: although they are portrayed as villains, and are demonized in various ways, they are also shown to be superior in power and discipline, and are depicted as an efficient, sophisticated, even glamorous adversary.
- Deus ex machina endings, in which the Partisans break out of seemingly hopeless situations.

Pavičić's analysis was criticized for not being universally applicable to Partisan films, and a number of notable exceptions to the above formula exist. By the 1980s, economic hardship in the country, as well as change in the ideological landscape, particularly with the younger Yugoslav generation, caused a waning of interest in the genre, and the critical and commercial failure of Bulajić's Great Transport (1983) is usually seen as a symbolic end of the Partisan film era.

== Notable films ==
- The Last Bridge (1954, directed by Helmut Käutner)
- Kozara (1962, directed by Veljko Bulajić)
- The Raid on Drvar (1963, directed by Fadil Hadžić)
- Nikoletina Bursać (1964, directed by Branko Bauer)
- The Secret Invasion (1964, directed by Roger Corman)
- Eagles Fly Early (1966, directed by Soja Jovanović)
- The Demolition Squad (1967, directed by Hajrudin Krvavac)
- Operation Belgrade (1968, directed by Žika Mitrović)
- Bomb at 10:10 (1967, directed by Časlav Damjanović)
- Battle of Neretva (1969, directed by Veljko Bulajić, nominated for Best Foreign Language Film at the 42nd Academy Awards)
- The Bridge (1969, directed by Hajrudin Krvavac)
- When You Hear the Bells (1969, directed by Antun Vrdoljak)
- The Pine Tree in the Mountain (1971, directed by Antun Vrdoljak)
- Walter Defends Sarajevo (1972, directed by Hajrudin Krvavac)
- Battle of Sutjeska (1973, directed by Stipe Delić)
- Bombaši (1973, directed by Predrag Golubović)
- Guns of War (1974, directed by Žika Mitrović)
- Hell River (1974, directed by Stole Janković)
- Crveni udar (1974, directed by Predrag Golubović)
- Doktor Mladen (1975, directed by Midhat Mutapdžić)
- The Peaks of Zelengora (1976, directed by Zdravko Velimirović)
- Maiden Bridge (1976, directed by Miomir Stamenković)
- Battle for South Railway (1978, directed by Zdravko Velimirović)
- Force 10 from Navarone (1978, directed by Guy Hamilton)
- Boško Buha (1978, directed by Branko Bauer)
- The Partisan Squadron or Battle of Eagles (1979, directed by Hajrudin Krvavac)
- 13th of July (1982, directed by Radomir Saranović)
- Great Transport (1983, directed by Veljko Bulajić)
- The Igman March (1983, directed by Zdravko Šotra)

== Notable television series ==
- Otpisani

== Sources ==
- Jugoslavenski špageti-vesterni: propaganda i nostalgija (in Croatian)
- Partizanski film je naša kulturna baština (in Serbian)
- Partizanski film i strip...ili priča o sađenju limuna u Sibiru (in Croatian)
- Pavičić, Jurica (June 2003). "Igrani filmovi Fadila Hadžića" (PDF). Hrvatski filmski ljetopis (in Croatian) (34): 3–38. Archived from the original (PDF) on 4 March 2016.
- Pavičić, Jurica (2016). "Titoist Cathedrals: The Rise and Fall of Partisan Film". In Ognjenović, Gorana; Jozelić, Jasna (eds.). Titoism, Self-Determination, Nationalism, Cultural Memory: Volume Two, Tito's Yugoslavia, Stories Untold (1st ed.). London: Palgrave Macmillan. pp. 37–65. doi:10.1057/978-1-137-59747-2_3. ISBN 978-1137597458.
- Jovanović, Nebojša (2011). "Fadil Hadžić u optici totalitarne paradigme". Hrvatski filmski ljetopis (in Croatian) (65–66): 47–59.
- Trifković, Gaj (2011). "In a Search for a Good German". Journal for Intelligence, Propaganda and Security Studies. 5 (1): 77–86.

== See also ==
- War film
- Cinema of Europe
