= Brotherhood and unity =

Slogan in Communist Yugoslavia

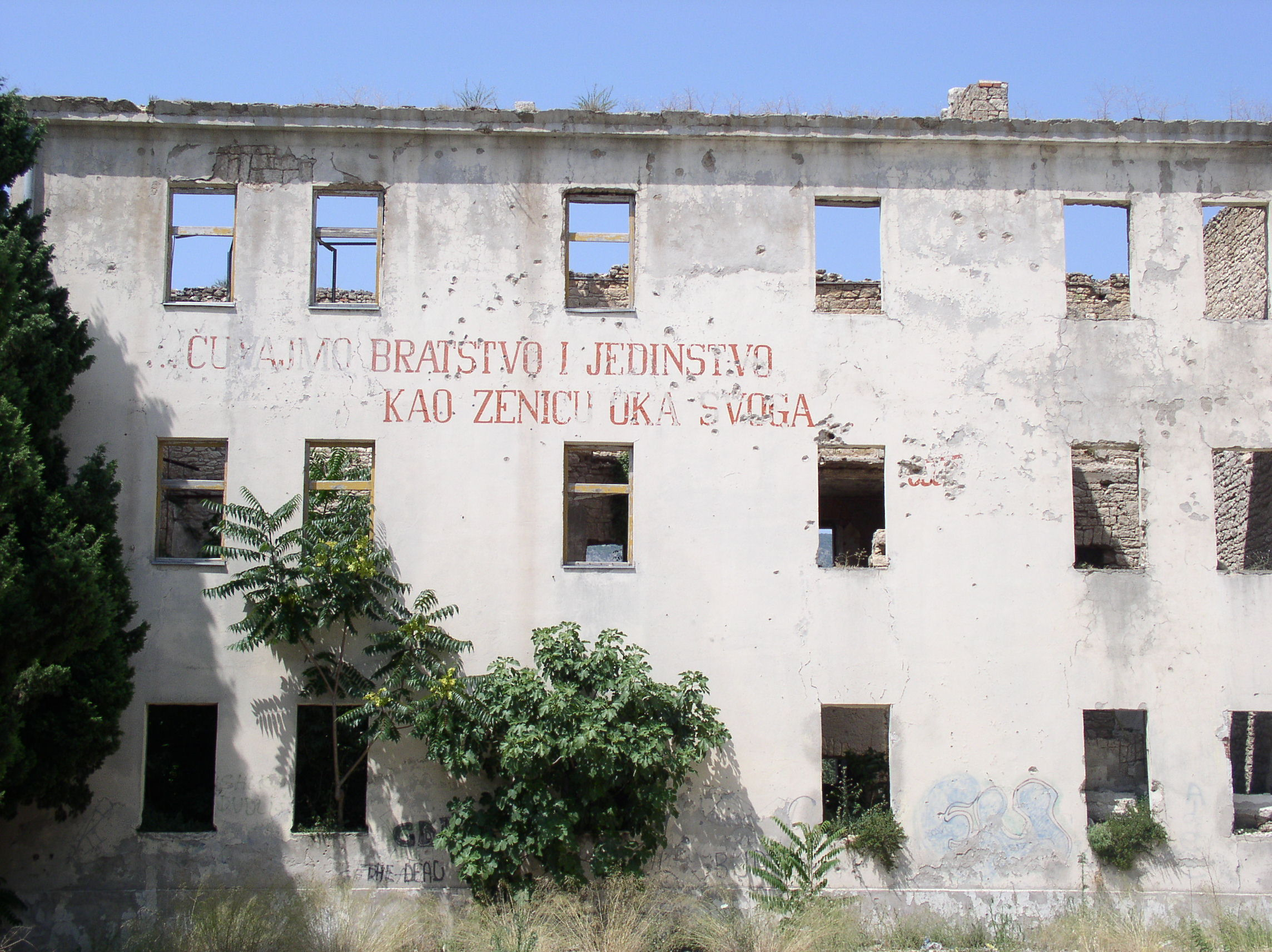
"Let us protect brotherhood and unity like the pupil of our eye", inscription on a building in Mostar destroyed during the Yugoslav Wars.

Brotherhood and unity was a popular slogan of the League of Communists of Yugoslavia that was coined during the Yugoslav People's Liberation War (1941–45), and which evolved into a guiding principle of Yugoslavia's post-war inter-ethnic policy. In Slovenia, the slogan "Brotherhood and Peace" (bratstvo in mir) was used in the beginning.

== History ==
After the invasion of Yugoslavia by the Axis powers in April 1941, the occupying powers and certain collaborator entities sought to incite hatred among the various national, ethnic and religious groups of Yugoslavia.

After the war, the slogan designated the official policy of inter-ethnic relations in the Socialist Federal Republic of Yugoslavia, as embodied in its federal constitutions of 1963 and of 1974. The policy prescribed that Yugoslavia's nations (Serbs, Macedonians, Croats, Slovenes, Montenegrins, Bosniaks) and national minorities (Albanians, Hungarians, Romanians, Bulgarians, Jews, Italians, Pannonian Rusyns, Ukrainians and others) are equal groups that coexist peacefully in the federation. Every individual was entitled to the expression of their own culture, while the ethnic groups had an oath to one another to maintain peaceful relations. Citizens were also encouraged and allowed to declare their nationality as Yugoslav, which usually polled at 10%.

Yugoslavia had a decoration called the Order of the Brotherhood and Unity.

Several prominent persons from former Yugoslavia were convicted for going against the ideals. Among them were Serbian radical Vojislav Šešelj, former presidents of Bosnia and Herzegovina (Alija Izetbegović) and Croatia (Franjo Tuđman and Stjepan Mesić), and others. One Kosovar Albanian, Adem Demaçi, was imprisoned and accused of nationalist machinations.

== Notes ==
1. Serbo-Croatian: Bratstvo i jedinstvo / Братство и јединство, Macedonian: Братство и единство, Slovene: Bratstvo in enotnost, Albanian: Vllaznim-Bashkim, later Vëllazërim-Bashkim, Hungarian: Testvériség és egység, Italian: Fratellanza e Unità, Romanian: Frăție și unitate, Turkish: Kardeşlik ve Birlik, Ukrainian: Братерство і єдність, German: Brüderlichkeit und Einheit, Bulgarian: Братство и единство, Slovak: Bratstvo a jednota, Czech: Bratrství a jednoty, Russian: Братство и единство
