= New Primitivism =

Subcultural movement established in Sarajevo

New Primitivism (Serbo-Croatian: Novi primitivizam) was a subcultural movement established in Sarajevo, Yugoslavia, in March 1983. It primarily used music, along with satire, sketch and surreal comedy on radio and television, as its forms of expression. Its protagonists and followers called themselves the New Primitives.

Functioning as a banner that summarizes and encompasses the work of two Sarajevo-based rock bands, Zabranjeno Pušenje and Elvis J. Kurtović & His Meteors, as well as the Top lista nadrealista radio segment that eventually grew into a television sketch show, the discourse of New Primitivism was seen as primarily irreverent and humorous. Additionally, two other prominent bands, Plavi Orkestar and Crvena Jabuka, that reached great commercial success in Yugoslavia during the mid 1980s were also tangentially associated with the movement though each abandoned its sensibility early on in favour of a more mainstream conventional musical and stylistic expression.

The movement officially disbanded some time in 1987, although the bands and television show continued for a few more years after that — Elvis J. Kurtović & His Meteors until 1988, Zabranjeno Pušenje until 1990 and Top lista nadrealista until 1991.

== Characteristics ==
Basing itself on the spirit of the Bosnian ordinary populace outside of the cultural mainstream, the movement was credited with introducing the jargon of Sarajevo mahalas (brimming with slang and Turkish loanwords) into the official Yugoslav public scene. Many of the New Primitivism songs and sketches involve stories of "small people" — pensioners, coalminers, petty criminals, street thugs, provincial girls, etc. — being placed in unusual and absurd situations. Stylistically, the New Primitives' methods drew comparisons to Monty Python's Flying Circus, sharing the short sketch form and utilizing absurdity as a means of eliciting laughs from an audience. The embodiment of New Primitivism is a youth who both reads challenging works such as Hegel's The Phenomenology of Spirit, but also does not mind having fistfights. In the most general sense, the movement was established as a Sarajevan reaction to the New wave and Punk movements that had been sweeping the Yugoslav alternative music scene for several years already. Some of New Primitivism's most notable traits were promoting and popularizing Sarajevan street jargon and slang that had not been well-known outside the city in others parts of Yugoslavia where Serbo-Croatian is spoken. In doing so - by depicting local fringe characters such as petty criminals, neighbourhood kafana alcoholics, lesser-known pop-cultural figures, blue-collar workers and local streets hoodlums - the movement exposed aspects of the Sarajevan mahala culture to a wider Yugoslav audience and eventually came to be considered a locally patriotic and eclectic expression of Sarajevan urban culture.

The movement's protagonists had a specific view of New Primitivism. Perhaps the most prominent of them, Nele Karajlić, explained it as being "created within clearly defined historical coordinates, both spatially and temporally, at the precise midpoint between the spot where Gavrilo Princip assassinated Archduke Franz Ferdinand in June 1914 and the spot where the Olympic flame was lit in February 1984 while temporally, it took place some time during the period between Tito's death in May 1980 and the beginning of the Agrokomerc Affair in 1987" and seeing it as "resistance to any form of establishment – cultural, social, and political – not just the rock'n'roll one that dominated Sarajevo at the time with so-called 'dinosaur' bands like Bijelo Dugme and Indexi, which the new primitives held in contempt to a certain extent". The movement's dominant method of social and cultural critique was to fully localize the narrative to Sarajevo, and to use local urban legends, cultural and social phenomena and living fringe characters as catalysts for painting a wider political picture. In doing so, the movement became both a rigidly local expressional form that gave a platform to the language, culture and myths of the Sarajevan streets, while also breaking out into the wider Yugoslav arena. A major characteristic of the movement was the adoption of pseudonyms by all of its leading figures, which tended to be either comical in nature or based on the semantics of nicknames that have always been very prevalent in Sarajevo. The main reason for this was so that none of the members could be ethnically identified. The second reason was to give a platform to the stylization of nicknames that was prominent in Sarajevo — a form of local patriotism and self-mockery.

The movement's "chief ideologue" Malkolm Muharem referred to New Primitivism simply as "the first Sarajevan bullet to hit its target since Princip assassinated Ferdinand in 1914".

== Origin of the term ==
The movement's name was introduced as a mock reaction to two early 1980s pop-culture movements: New Romanticism in the West and Neue Slowenische Kunst in the Yugoslav constituent republic of SR Slovenia. On one hand, the term New Primitivism was a clear anti-reference to New Romantic, as the Sarajevo lads sought to be anything but romantic and sugar-sweet while on the other hand, they also wanted to emphasize the stereotypes encountered in many popular Yugoslav jokes about Bosnians and Slovenians—the former portrayed as raw, unsophisticated, dim-witted, and openhearted, and the latter presented as stiff, cold, serious, distant, and calculated. In the artistic and expressional sense, New Primitivism was a reaction to the New wave and Punk movements.

== History ==
During the late 1970s and early 1980s, a generation of kids from the Sarajevo neighbourhood of Koševo—all born in the early to mid-1960s—was coming up. Raised within upper-middle-class families inhabiting post-World War II apartment buildings typical of communist Yugoslavia, their interests included music, football, and movies. They soon converged on music as their main activity and simultaneously with entering high school started forming bands despite possessing very limited musical skills. Most of their musical influences were found in Western popular culture—from early ones such as Jerry Lee Lewis, Lou Reed, the Rolling Stones, The Who, etc. to those found later on the emerging punk scene.

By early 1980, the kids were able to adapt a cellar at the 19 Fuada Midžića Street low-rise apartment building into a makeshift rehearsal space where they held band practices, chamber plays, even an odd fashion show. Initially very informal with irregular rehearsals and frequently changing lineups (often through swapping band members), by 1981, the bands—named Zabranjeno Pušenje and Elvis J. Kurtović & His Meteors—took on a more serious note. Adopting garage/punk rock sensibility, they started devoting more attention to songwriting and began playing small clubs around town. In parallel, from May 1981, some of the kids from both bands got a chance to collaborate on Top lista nadrealista, a comedy segment on Primus radio show that aired weekly, Saturday mornings, on Radio Sarajevo's channel two.

=== 1982–1983: Forming a movement ===
The idea to create a movement as an umbrella entity encompassing their entire activity had been tossed about for months during the second part of 1982 and early 1983 between the individuals in and around Elvis J. Kurtović & His Meteors—the band's manager Malkolm Muharem, its main lyricist and mascot Elvis J. Kurtović, and its singer Rizo Petranović—who had come up with the New Primitivism Manifesto printed in 1982 in a local fanzine.

Additional notable members of the movement included dr. Nele Karajlić, mr. Sejo Sexon, Dražen Ričl, Boris Šiber, Zenit Đozić, and others from the Sarajevo neighbourhood of Koševo. Along the way, individuals outside of the narrow Koševo milieu, most notably Branko "Đuro" Đurić, joined in and would also become prominent. Despite being a bit older and also not from the same neighbourhood, film director Emir Kusturica (who had already become well-established with his award-winning movie Sjećaš li se Doli Bel?) was an associate and friend of the crew; although his movies can not be directly associated with the movement, their spirit certainly shares some sentiment with New Primitivism. With the bands playing small gigs around the city, they encountered other up and coming rock bands such as Plavi orkestar that also cultivated similar thematic narratives focused on stories of local small time characters, but would eventually move away from the aesthetic and overtly turn towards mainstream commercialism.

The movement's wider unofficial unveiling was said to have taken place at an Elvis J. Kurtović & His Meteors gig in Sarajevo's CEDUS club venue during early March 1983. Also playing the gig was Zabranjeno Pušenje. Influenced by movies like 1979's Quadrophenia that portray the youth scene of London with subcultures like mods, rockers, and teddy boys, the guys from Koševo tried to create their own local version of that. The formal introduction of the new entity changed nothing in the internal group dynamic as they all continued functioning as a neighbourhood gang of friends, but it gave the press something to latch onto and made it easier to market the bands outside of the city. By his own admission, Muharem used the movement to "try and create an impression to those in Belgrade and Zagreb that there's something more going on in Sarajevo than there actually is".

In addition to music and radio comedy, the lads decided to expand their modes of expression now that they functioned as a movement—attempting to come up with a clothing style to associate with New Primitivism. The movement's unofficial look was thus born with a démodé style consisting of waist tight bell-bottom pants, plaid suit jackets, thin golden necklace worn above the shirt, and pointy shoes (the so-called špicoke)—similar to the 1970s leisure suit look—which the lads adopted from petty hoodlums and small-time smugglers and pickpockets seen around Baščaršija selling, though not wearing, clothing items such as Levi's 501 jeans that were either smuggled in from Italy or counterfeit locally in Yugoslavia. Elvis J. Kurtović & His Meteors especially embraced the throwback look, with young crowds soon showing up to their club gigs dressed this way. Meanwhile, Karajlić came up with the movement's unofficial creed: "Tuđe hoćemo, svoje nemamo" ("What's not ours, we want; because ours, we haven't got."), a parody on one of the often used political slogans of the communist period: "Tuđe nećemo, svoje ne damo." ("What's not ours, we don't want; ours, we won't give up on.").

During summer 1983, after getting back from an out-of-town gig somewhere, we went to our favourite kafana Dedan at Baščaršija where our friend Đuro told us about a journalist from Start looking for us to do an interview. We were convinced Đuro's fucking with us, but he insisted, telling us the guy had already looked for us at TV Sarajevo (where of course no one ever heard of us), at Diskoton (where they were also clueless as to who we are), before finally resorting to asking about us from kafana to kafana and eventually ending up at Dedan, leaving a phone number with Đuro. This confirmed to us once more what we had already picked up on during our out-of-town gigs—that people outside of the city are taking our braggadocios and bombastic proclamations in the youth print about being the 'kings of Sarajevo' quite literally and quite seriously. In reality we were complete unknowns. Media outlets in Sarajevo didn't give two shits about us, but we noticed that our embellished stories found a receptive audience in youth print media from other Yugoslav cities. They especially lapped up our tales of this 'great new movement in Sarajevo called New Primitivism'.

— Elvis J. Kurtović on the band's initial promotional strategy.

One of the first activities on movement's behalf was writing an open letter to Sarajevo's own Goran Bregović, a well-known and established Yugoslav rock musician who was then going through a creative and commercial crisis. His band, Bijelo Dugme's latest studio effort had been receiving poor reviews and selling underwhelmingly, in addition to reports of band members' infighting and vocalist Željko Bebek's imminent departure. Dripping with sarcasm and backhanded compliments, the new primitives' letter invited Bregović to join them, offering him a fresh start along with creative reset.

=== 1983–1984: Elvis J. Kurtović & His Meteors get the ball rolling ===
Elvis J. Kurtović & His Meteors were the first to establish a bit of a buzz on the scene. Promoted by Muharem, who in addition to the band's business affairs also had influence on their creative output, EJK&HM—along with gigging in clubs around Sarajevo—also started playing clubs nationwide from 1983; in Belgrade (SKC), Zagreb (Kulušić and Lapidarij), Rijeka (Palah), Pula, etc., getting enthusiastic reactions from young club crowds everywhere. Though their sound was hardly original, with straight covers of the Rolling Stones, The Who, etc. dominating the repertoire, EJK&HM live shows attracted attention with a unique mixture of rock'n'roll with elements of performance art and stand-up comedy, anchored by Elvis J. Kurtović—the band's lyricist and mascot—exuberantly interacting with the crowd between songs. They mostly played student clubs with their promotional activities strictly limited to printed press. Muharem would get them publicity by talking up New Primitivism and ensuring journalists from youth-oriented papers—Džuboks and Reporter from Belgrade, Polet from Zagreb, and Mladina from Ljubljana—have the 'right angle' for the story while the band members would contribute by providing colourful interviews and quotable sound bytes often delivered in form of a manifesto.

In late July 1983, the fledgling band received a huge boost after Start, a Yugoslavia-wide high-circulation weekly men's entertainment magazine in the vein of Playboy and Lui, deployed its journalist Goran Gajić to Sarajevo for a story on the unconventional group. Published as a two-page spread headlined "Meteorski uspon Elvisa J. Kurtovića" (Elvis J. Kurtović's Meteoric Rise) in a magazine that's circulated in 200,000 copies, the story was by far the biggest media exposure the band had gotten up to that point. Building upon talking points already well established and developed by Muharem and Kurtović through the country's youth print media, the Start piece affirms and flatters the EJK&HM youngsters—proclaiming them to be "the next important thing in Yugoslav rock". Along with a new batch of the band members' trademark off-the-wall soundbytes sprinkled throughout, the article also re-published—on Muharem's insistence despite Kurtović's apparent opposition—their sarcastic open letter to Goran Bregović that thus got a much bigger audience.

In the fall of 1983, Muharem booked Elvis J. Kurtovich & His Meteors for a double bill concert with D' Boys at Sarajevo's Đuro Đaković Hall, an all-seater venue holding almost a thousand patrons. The show sold out, and was a triumph for a band that at the time hadn't been on television yet and still had no studio recordings.

Muharem soon arranged for the band to get some time in Akvarijus studio in Belgrade during December 1983 in order to record material for their debut album. Its production was originally supposed to be handled by Peđa Vranešević of Laboratorija Zvuka, but was eventually entrusted to Goran Vejvoda as well as Elvis J. Kurtović and Muharem themselves. Margita Stefanović from Katarina II made a guest appearance on the synthesizer during the album recording sessions as her band was recording its own debut album in the same studio at the same time.

EJK&HM and Muharem soon agreed a record contract with ZKP RTLj and their debut album Mitovi i legende o Kralju Elvisu came out in February 1984 right in the middle of the Winter Olympics being held in the city. Figuring that promoting the album during the Olympics would get them extra attention due to all the press and other visitors gathered in the city, EJK&HM held a press junket that largely turned shambolic as well as a series of club gigs at the popular student club Trasa. They also made one of their first proper TV appearances, lip-synching "Baščaršy Hanumen" on Hit meseca (Yugoslav counterpart to Top of the Pops) while hamming it up for the cameras. The album release was followed by a promotional club tour of bigger Yugoslav cities, but since the record was selling poorly with less than 15,000 copies sold, the tour ended quickly and the deflated band members returned home to Sarajevo.

Malkolm Muharem soon quit working with the band.

=== 1984: Das ist Walter released, Top lista nadrealista expands to television ===
A few months later, in April 1984, Zabranjeno Pušenje's debut album Das ist Walter was released by Jugoton in a limited issue of 3,000 copies, clearly indicative of the label's extremely low commercial expectations. Recorded in immensely modest circumstances over an unreasonably long period of seven months due to reasons beyond their control, the album features hyperlocalized punk and garage rock sensibility with songs referencing various Sarajevo-area toponyms and cultural touchstones such as Vratnik, Baščaršija, Bare Cemetery, FK Sarajevo, Hadžići, Bajram, Tržnica (city's main marketplace), Valter brani Sarajevo, Fuada Midžića Street, and an obscure movie theater showing low-budget foreign films. Most of the songs center around individuals from the social fringe such as a Zenica prison-incarcerated hoodlum who knifed a man to death for sexually assaulting his wife ("Zenica Blues"), a Hanka-and-Šaban-loving, hippie-bashing, anarchist-graffiti-hating, West-despising local Vratnik heavy exerting his authority over the neighbourhood, a taxi driver who works only at night having recently returned home to Sarajevo following a prison stint in Zenica over an unspecified transgression, eager local community organizer/politician on his way up in the communist nomenklatura, Kreka and Banovići coal miners, etc.

Its initial sales were nothing to speak of.

Simultaneously with the album release, Top lista nadrealista moved to television as a weekly sketch comedy programme. The shows started airing on 2 June 1984 on TV Sarajevo's channel two as well as on JRT exchange for the rest of the country. Despite being placed in a milieu well removed from their natural setting—their comedy sketches were essentially fillers in-between folk music numbers—the show eventually proved a good vehicle for reaching a wider audience. After the opening few episodes that were largely met with indifference, the show started gaining a bit of an audience outside of its Sarajevo youth core with whom it had immediately struck a chord.

This gradually increased viewership of Top lista nadrealista had a positive effect on Das ist Walter sales. Riding the buzz created by the TV show as well as the growing popularity of the "Zenica Blues" track (cover of Johnny Cash's "San Quentin"), Karajlić's and Sexon's blend of punk and local storytelling began finding an increasingly receptive audience months after its initial release. No one was more surprised at this turn of events than the label itself as it was forced to order multiple new batches of the album copies on records and cassettes.

New Primitivism as a term also started catching on as Yugoslav media began using it when referencing the band's style or when talking about the television show. Also, another popular songs off the album, "Anarhija All Over Baščaršija" (Anarchy All Over Baščaršija), explicitly mentions New Primitives, bringing them up in the context of "violent locals from Vratnik who love Yugoslav folk music, attack hippies, and are repulsed by the West".

On 15 September 1984 as Top lista nadrealista television episodes resumed broadcasting following the summer break, the band played Sarajevo's Dom Mladih on a bill that also included Bajaga i Instruktori in front of a raucous crowd of 4,500. The band was officially out of the clubs and now playing larger halls. In October 1984, Zabranjeno Pušenje went to Belgrade for a show at SKC where they were surprised to discover their newfound popularity. In addition to having to add an extra show in the same venue the next day due to popular demand, they also started getting recognized by kids on the street. The two SKC shows launched the band on an extensive and successful Yugoslavia-wide tour; on 4 November 1984 they sold out Hala sportova, a sports arena in Belgrade with 6,000 in attendance. Simultaneously, by November 1984, Karajlić began to get noticed by high-circulation lifestyle magazines in Yugoslavia such as TV novosti and Studio as the connection between his Top lista nadrealista television sketch comedy characters and his colourful rock star stage persona with Zabranjeno Pušenje got clearly established. The band would end up playing over 60 concert dates on that tour.

In parallel, the album sales ended up hitting the 100,000 mark while the term New Primitives also became well established in the process. However, the increased profile also meant increased scrutiny as Karajlić and the band were about to find out.

=== 1984–1985: The 'Marshall' affair... ===
At a concert in Rijeka's Dvorana Mladosti before a crowd of some two and a half thousand people on Tuesday, 27 November 1984, the band inadvertently set off a firestorm of controversy.

During soundcheck before the show, the band's amplifier went bust to which Karajlić jokingly exclaimed: "Crk'o maršal" (The "Marshall has croaked!"), followed by a pause before adding: "Mislim na pojačalo" ("The amplifier, that is") (a switcheroo remark about the 1980 death of Marshal Tito), getting a chuckle from a small group of people within the earshot. Liking the reaction he got during soundcheck, the twenty-one-year-old decided to start the actual concert by delivering the same joke as an explanation of why the show is starting late.

==== Reaction in SR Croatia ====
There were hardly any negative reactions during the concert or immediately after it as the band continued its tour with a triumphant concert at Dom sportova's Ledena dvorana in Zagreb in front of 12,000 fans on 10 December 1984. Though a few write-ups mentioning Karajlić's marshal quip appeared in neutral tone in Zagreb-based papers leading up to the Dom sportova concert, it would be the op-ed piece by journalist Veljko Vičević in the Rijeka-based daily newspaper Novi list that started an avalanche of criticism with far-reaching consequences. Headlined "Opak dim Zabranjenog pušenja" (Zabranjeno Pušenje's Sinister Smoke), Vičević's piece strongly denounces the band for "lack of morals" and "stepping over the line", additionally reproaching individual group members for past statements such as "Tuđe hoćemo/nećemo, svoje nemamo".

Vičević's piece cast the first stone that would soon turn into avalanche, and eventually end up in a legal process against Karajlić, as well as, by extension, complete public marginalization of the band, new primitives, and Top lista nadrealista.

Initially, the Novi list criticism of the band only served to open another front in the ongoing power struggle between two internal factions wresting for the control of the Croatian Socialist Youth League (SSOH), the provincial branch of the Yugoslav Socialist Youth League (SSOJ), itself the youth wing of the country's one and only political party—Yugoslav Communist League (SKJ). Ever since the death of Vladimir Bakarić a year and a half earlier, the fight for the control of SR Croatia's SKJ branch (SKH) had been on between two factions: the so-called bakarićevci who ostensibly pressed on with the old guard Bakarić policies and the so-called šuvarovci, supposed reformers who gathered around the up-and-coming forty-eight-year-old communist Stipe Šuvar. Since the Rijeka concert had been organized by the local pro-Šuvar SSO in Rijeka, the rival pro-Bakarić camp jumped on Karajlić's Marshal quip as fodder to discredit the concert organizers and other pro-Šuvar elements within the organization. The pro-Šuvar faction, which held control of the Croatian SSO's Zagreb-based weekly newspaper Polet, used the publication as a platform for responses and counter-accusations. By extension, Polet vehemently defended Karajlić and Zabranjeno Pušenje. For his part, while generally appreciative of Polet's support, Karajlić would also acknowledge in later interviews that it was no more principled than the attacks from the other side: "Neither side gave a damn about me, really, I was just a rhetorical device, a prop used by both sides in their little internal fight".

==== Reaction in Sarajevo ====
Some ten days later, in late December 1984, the news of the Rijeka flap made it back to Sarajevo where more journalists—most notably Pavle Pavlović in the As weekly newspaper—were ready to condemn the band further. In his piece headlined "Otrovni dim Zabranjenog pušenja" (Zabranjeno Pušenje's Poisonous Smoke), Pavlović labels Karajlić's words "an insensitive association and piece of sarcasm that insults right to the heart". The columnist then trails off to even take ideological issue with the humorous sound bytes in radio jingles promoting the December 1984 release of the Top lista nadrealista radio material on audio cassette by Diskoton. He continues by predicting that "the young band's life span will be little longer than that of a butterfly" before adding that "sadly even such short time is enough to indoctrinate the impressionable kids with new thoughts, including continuous ridicule of everything that we've created so far as well as banal, low-brow tampering with the basic tenet of the People's Liberation War—Tuđe nećemo, svoje ne damo". Pavlović concludes by musing "whether the time has come to extinguish Zabranjeno Pušenje's poisonous smoke for good". Being published in a high-circulation newspaper, whose average number of copies distributed per issue regularly exceeded 350,000 by late 1984 (and would occasionally even go as high as 420,000), gave the story a huge audience in the city and beyond.

In addition to the high-circulation As tabloid, other Sarajevo-based newspapers such as Ven and Oslobođenje quickly joined in the condemnation of the band via strongly worded op-eds of their own.

Ironically, weekly tabloid Ven's relatively short broadside against the band headlined "Smrdljiv dim Zabranjenog pušenja" (Zabranjeno Pušenje's Stinking Smoke) came out in the very next issue after the same newspaper had named Zabranjeno Pušenje the "1984 band of the year" based on its own poll of Yugoslav pop-rock and folk composers. Only one week after awarding the group, Ven distances itself from Zabranjeno Pušenje by expressing "regret we named these young boys the best rock band of 1984" and assures the public that "had the news of their behaviour been available one week prior, they would have never been included in the poll". The unsigned op-ed concludes by telling Ven's readers that "these youngsters are using the platform afforded to them to launch puns that cause unequivocal associations of ridicule of the holiest of all Yugoslavs as well as scornful derision of one of the fundamental maxims of our society [Tuđe nećemo, svoje ne damo]".

The Oslobođenje piece, which reprinted Vičević's Novi list op-ed in full followed by Oslobođenje's own severe criticism of Zabranjeno Pušenje, was especially damning for the band considering the daily newspaper presumed a more serious reputation and tone than As and Ven and as such usually steered clear of pop culture and show business topics. Headlined "Opušci novih primitivaca" (The New Primitives' Butts), the Oslobođenje editorial by its columnist Ramo Kolar admonishes Karajlić for "insulting and smearing the Marshal of Yugoslavia in the ugliest way" and wonders "which sources (of life) do they [the new primitives] draw their insults and smears of the people they could barely remember (and who are immeasurably better than them ethically and in many other ways) from" before concluding: "It's one thing to crack locally-flavoured jokes, but it's quite another to spit upon the things that have made this country, which rose from the ashes and blood of its best sons, what it is. That is not something to be, excuse me, fucked around with by the new primitives or anyone else".

Stung by the Oslobođenje piece, the very next day the members of Zabranjeno Pušenje reacted by issuing a letter to all socio-political organizations within the city of Sarajevo and the Socialist Republic of Bosnia-Herzegovina, including the print media outlets that had been criticizing the band. Referencing the Oslobođenje write-up, the band members claim it "contains grave untruths and unbelievable accusations about our on-stage behaviour based on unverified and false rumours that have been maliciously spread in order to discredit us morally and politically". Expressing deep disappointment that as born-and-bred Sarajevans they're experiencing media attacks in their own city, the Zabranjeno Pušenje members also remind the public of their socialist credentials by bringing up their three performances at various Relay of Youth runnings including their live performance before 100,000 youths at the Marx and Engels Square in Belgrade some six months earlier at the Youth Day celebrations. The letter continues by conveying "bitterness over the attacks originating from sections of the press in our own city without even seeking our side of the story" before making a veiled reference to As journalist Pavle Pavlović by complaining that "more credence seems to be given to a malicious manufacturer of false rumours and spitefully presented untruths than to us who were actually there". The gist of the letter is their claim that they never insulted the image and legacy of Comrade Tito thus denying media reports claiming otherwise and labeling them "monstrous lies". However, the letter was generally ignored within Sarajevo and SR Bosnia-Herzegovina as the only press outlets to publish it some twenty days later were Zagreb's Polet and Belgrade's Politika.

Since none of the press outlets in Sarajevo and the rest of Bosnia and Herzegovina published their letter, the members decided to go to the institutions of the system directly, arranging two days later to be received by the Bosnia-Herzegovina Communist League Central Committee member Hrvoje Ištuk and managing to get some assurances from him that the situation would soon settle down. However, quite the opposite began happening as the band's already scheduled concerts started being canceled. The first in what would turn out to be a log series of canceled concerts over the coming months were the two shows scheduled in Split on the 11th and 12 January 1985.

In a communist country where "verbal offence" was criminalized (i.e. listed in the criminal code as grounds for legal prosecution), Karajlić, and the rest of the band, were summoned for dozens of police questionings as public criticism or ridicule, either veiled or open, of communist Yugoslavia's sacred cows—Tito, the party, or the People's Liberation War—was grounds for severe punishment. Karajlić ended up being taken to court with a criminal charge that was eventually reduced to a misdemeanor one in a legal process that stretched on for years.

=== ...and its consequences ===
Taking my lawyer's advice, the defense I presented at the 'Marshal has croaked' court hearings was continuous denials I ever said the remark they accused me of saying. My lawyer, being an intelligent man fully aware of the particular point in time, politically, in Yugoslavia, knew the extent to which this mad witch-hunt could've gone to had I admitted to actually uttering the remark. He also knew 'Marshal has croaked', which still sounded like blasphemy in 1984, would soon take on a whole different contextual meaning. And really, within a short few years, figuratively speaking, 'Marshal has croaked' became an official political programme for many of the newly founded political parties that were in the process of gaining strength and eventually winning power all over Yugoslavia.

— Nele Karajlić on the 1985–86 verbal offence court case against him.

However, an even bigger problem was that Zabranjeno Pušenje became blacklisted as a result of the Marshal episode. While not banned outright, their songs were taken off radio playlists, their access to television was restricted, and more than 30 of their already booked concerts in early 1985 ended up getting canceled due to pressure from above that manifested itself through sudden introduction of administrative obstacles such as denying permits for the venues on the day of the show and so on.

Throughout January 1985, the new primitives experienced multiple bizarre manifestations of this sudden anti-Zabranjeno Pušenje hysteria in Sarajevo.

Each January, during winter school break, TV Sarajevo's daytime schedule consisted of various kids' shows reruns, and one such show happened to feature the band's hit song "Zenica Blues". Not being aware of that, the technician running the control room that day let the show air by mistake. Since Zabranjeno Pušenje were essentially banned from the station, TV Sarajevo executives found it sufficiently necessary to apologize for the oversight later that day in the station's central daily newscast Dnevnik 2 and also to issue temporary suspensions both to the technician as well as to the executive in charge.

By association, the hysteria also spread to Top lista nadrealista activities. While promoting their freshly released comedy album (released by Diskoton on audio cassette, containing the best-of compilation of 'Top lista nadrealista' radio segment) in Sarajevo, there was such a stigma attached to the group's activity in the city that not a single journalists was brave enough to show up at the promotional press event at Muzikalije record store in Štrosmajerova Street, fearing that being seen there would be interpreted as a public show of support for beleaguered Karajlić and the rest of his mates.

Due to all the problems and hassle suddenly associated with organizing a Zabranjeno Pušenje gig, local promoters began avoiding the band despite clear demand for their concerts. Finding itself increasingly isolated in addition to seeing its commercial momentum slip away, the band decided to invest all its energy into organizing a single high-profile gig that would hopefully as much as anything serve as a statement of encouragement for all potential promoters not to shy away from the band. Still, despite selling out Hala Pionir in Belgrade on Saturday, 16 February 1985 with more than 7,000 people in attendance, the concert didn't have the desired media effect and the band's downward slide continued with gigs now completely dried up.

Facing insurmountable obstacles, the group gave in temporarily, deciding to lie low for some time while some of the members went back to making Top lista nadrealista on Radio Sarajevo. However, in March 1985, the authorities put an end to that too, removing the segment for good from the radio schedule.

Just as the career of one New Primitivism band, Zabranjeno Pušenje, was suddenly spiraling downhill, another band from the same milieu, Plavi Orkestar, was getting big.

Other bands that at one time or another identified with New Primitives include: Bombaj Štampa, Plavi Orkestar, Dinar and Crvena Jabuka, although they quickly moved on to more commercial and communicative forms of expression.

=== 1984–1985: Muharem takes over Plavi Orkestar, Soldatski bal hits it big ===
To be completely honest, I eked out that contract [for the upstart Plavi Orkestar in late 1984 and early 1985] purely on the back of Zabranjeno Pušenje’s commercial success with Das ist Walter. The main thrust of my pitch to [Jugoton CEO] Škarica was that this material is another New Primitive project, only this time from an angle of camp. And it was still a very tough sell though he eventually budged, even signing off on tracks like “Suada” and “Šta će nama šoferima kuća”. Still, his acceptance was only preliminary as he wanted at least 5-6 new tracks to be recorded, deferring his final decision until then. So, basically, the band had to make demos all over again. And since the members were in complete disarray with only Loša available, I managed, through Jajo Houra, to get a hold of Hus to produce these new demo recordings. Hus, in turn, brought over his Parni Valjak mates to play, like a hired emergency cleanup crew of sorts... And it was only then that Škarica gave his final go ahead. So, yes, the recordings that made Jugoton finally sign Plavi Orkestar were de facto Parni Valjak recordings.

— Plavi Orkestar manager Malkolm Muharem on the backroom dealings that led to the release of Soldatski bal.

Though the torch of New Primitivism had primarily been carried by Elvis J. Kurtovich & His Meteors and Zabranjeno Pušenje, other bands were also associated with the movement.

Within six months of splitting with Elvis J. Kurtovich & His Meteors following the lackluster reception of their debut album, crafty manager Malkolm Muharem switched over to another local Sarajevo outfit—Plavi Orkestar—a band that had existed since 1981 before beginning to gig on the city's student club scene in 1983 and was now looking to take the next step by recording and releasing a studio album. Though also starting out as a garage/punk rock group that often crossed paths with Pušenje and EJK (Orkestar's bassist Ćera I even played on Pušenje's demo recordings before joining Orkestar while the bands also often held club gigs together), over time, especially after achieving stable lineup of Loša, Pava, Ćera I, and Ćera II in early summer 1983, Plavi Orkestar moved to more conventional forms of expression within Yugoslav general cultural context. In practice, that meant essentially abandoning punk in favour of pop and openly flirting with Yugoslav commercial folk in their sound. Though opening doors for them commercially, this practice somewhat placed them on the fringes of New Primitivism. Compared to the two main new primitive outfits, Plavi Orkestar's stage appearance was far more orderly and their lyrics were less cerebral.

Nevertheless, Muharem saw a new opportunity with the four fresh-faced lads each of whom just turned 20 having recently returned to the city from their respective year-long mandatory army services. In addition to crossing paths with them at various club gigs over the preceding few years while he managed Elvis J. Kurtovich & His Meteors, Muharem had already shared a few instances of brief business collaboration with the Plavi Orkestar youngsters such as helping them, in September 1983, arrange demo recording sessions at Enco Lesić's Druga Maca studio in Belgrade right before they reported for their respective mandatory army stints. In fall 1984 when Muharem officially took the band under his wing, Plavi Orkestar barely existed with its main creative duo—frontman Saša Lošić and guitarist Mladen "Pava" Pavičić—not on speaking terms and Pava refusing to participate in any band-related activities. Not deterred, Muharem took their 1983 demos over to Jugoton's chief executive Siniša Škarica, pitching him another new primitive band by presenting Plavi Orkestar's sound and image as camp. By his own admission, Muharem used the tremendous success of Zabrenjeno Pušenje's Das ist Walter album as his main selling point with Škarica who reportedly needed further convincing as he made the band record more demos. Through personal connections like Prljavo Kazalište's Jasenko Houra, Muharem got Parni Valjak's Husein "Hus" Hasanefendić to agree to record a few more demos with the Plavi Orkestar youngsters, which brought Pavičić back into the fold and by January 1985 all four were off to Zagreb to record in SIM studio. Subsequently, these new demos managed to secure them a pre-contract with Jugoton.

The album, named Soldatski bal, came out in February 1985 and instantly created a sensation all over Yugoslavia, placing the young band among the most successful Yugoslav rock acts like Bijelo Dugme and Riblja Čorba. Muharem essentially stayed true to the promotional techniques he had previously implemented with Elvis J. Kurtovich & His Meteors—print media and soundbites—though the sarcastic bravado of EJK&HM was now replaced with Plavi Orkestar's dreamy boyish charm. However, this time it had a tremendous commercial effect as the band embarked on a Yugoslavia-wide tour in late summer 1985 with scenes of thousands of screaming and fainting teenage girls repeated in town after town. Named 'Bolje biti pijan nego star' (Better Drunk than Old) after the band's hit track, the tour included 140 concerts in sports arenas and other large venues throughout the country. Muharem additionally hired journalist-turned-filmmaker Goran Gajić to shoot a tour documentary thus reuniting with the writer two years after his glowing summer 1983 piece on Elvis J. Kurtović in Start. Furthermore, Gajić directed a video for Plavi Orkestar's hit track "Kad mi kažeš, paša" featuring actresses Tanja Bošković, Sonja Savić, journalist Mirjana Bobić-Mojsilović, and TV personality Suzana Mančić. The album ended up selling 550,000 copies. Though with unexpected and sudden success the band's sensibility quickly transformed even more into folkish pop as they almost morphed into a sugary boy band, many media outlets still presented them as a new primitive group, giving the movement unprecedented promotion in Yugoslavia during the first half of 1985.

=== 1985–1986: Ričl leaves Elvis J. Kurtović & His Meteors to form Crvena Jabuka, gets big immediately ===
After parting ways with their manager Malkolm Muharem in mid-1984 following the disappointing commercial performance of their debut album Mitovi i legende o Kralju Elvisu, Elvis J. Kurtovich & His Meteors kept soldiering on with the same lineup, releasing another record—1985's Da Bog da crk'o rok'n'rol—that similarly failed to connect with the general audience.

Their June 1985 appearance at YU Rock Misija at the Marakana stadium in Belgrade effectively turned out to be the band's swan song. Guitarist Dražen Ričl—who had since May 1985 already been musically reconnecting with Zlaja Arslanagić, his old Ozbiljno Pitanje bandmate and Top lista nadrealista co-protagonist—officially left Elvis J. Kurtović & His Meteors after the YU Rock Misija performance. The rest of the members—vocalist Rizo Petranović, drummer Radomir "Hare" Gavrilović, bassist Nermin "Fićo" Dedić, and keyboardist Zoran "Poka" Degan—also followed suit as the band essentially ceased to exist.

Though Ričl and Arslanagić had been in touch throughout the years since their 1982 Ozbiljno Pitanje split, the two reconvened in summer 1985 to form a new band they would eventually name Crvena Jabuka. Since both the twenty-three-year-old Ričl and twenty-four-year-old Arslanagić had already achieved a measure of prominence via Top lista nadrealista, their summer 1985 gathering for a musical project generated press even before the new band released any songs. Press comparisons and parallels to Plavi Orkestar, another Sarajevo band whose young members came up through New Primitivism before moving on to a more commercial sound and blowing up on the Yugoslav music scene, were especially frequent. The press narrative of Crvena Jabuka following in the footsteps of Plavi Orkestar's creative and business model especially intensified when the new band signed with Jugoton towards the end of 1985. The album recording sessions in SIM studio in Zagreb were also closely followed by the Yugoslav music press including even television coverage.

In late March 1986, Crvena Jabuka's eponymous debut album got released and immediately went on to great commercial success. Though employing some of the localized aesthetics of New Primitivism, the album is a broad Yugoslav commercial record designed to reach as many youths as possible with a sound ranging between melodic power pop and pop rock. Still, many critics and observers kept connecting Crvena Jabuka with New Primitivism despite even Ričl and Arslanagić distancing their new band from the movement while doing promotional press for the album.

=== 1987: Official demise ===
New Primitivism got disbanded in 1987 in a mock ceremony attended by most of its founders and prominent figures. Shot at Sarajevo's Academy of Performing Arts (ASU) in form of a television comedy sketch for TV Sarajevo, The Official New Primitivism Disbandment was framed as a Yugoslav Communist League (SKJ) congress with delegates taking turns to speak at the podium. Named the 7th Extraordinary New Primitivism Congress, it concluded that the movement is to be disbanded immediately by its members with the mantra "better us [to do it] than somebody else".

== Reaction and reception ==
=== 1983 ===
The initial wider Yugoslav media reaction to the movement wasn't positive. During New Primitivism's nascent stage, following a summer 1983 double-bill concert by Elvis J. Kurtovich & His Meteors and Plavi Orkestar at Belgrade's SKC, a blurb appeared in the high-circulation Politika daily reviewing the show, but also discussing the movement in general. In his negative review, rock critic Ljuba Trifunović places New Primitivsm in the same context with commercial folk singer Lepa Brena's then-current flirtation with rock sound (which he pejoratively terms "naïve rock"), expressing disappointment that "both appeared precisely when we began to think Yugoslav rock finally became immune to such diseases due to new wave effectively washing away the so-called 'shepherd rock' and all of its derivatives". Seeing New Primitivsm in continuity with several past offerings from the Sarajevo musical scene such as composer Nikola Borota Radovan's opus, Jutro, early Bijelo Dugme, and Milić Vukašinović's collaboration with Hanka Paldum, Trifunović feels the adjective "new" to be entirely superfluous in the movement's name: "Elvis J. Kurtovich & His Meteors and Plavi Orkestar are representatives of this renewed and stripped-down primitivsm, and even if some inconsequential differences do exist when comparing the two bands' interpretative dilettantism (with EJK&HM coming out on top), what's really depressing is their absolute creative pathos embodied in the creed 'let's be ourselves'—primitive Balkanoids".

Though initially mostly negatively reviewed by the Yugoslav rock critics, the movement did receive an unexpected compliment from Yugoslavia's most successful and famous rock musician Goran Bregović, himself often mercilessly lampooned by the new primitives. During fall 1983, in a televised interview for TV Sarajevo's rock music show Rock oko, he referred to New Primitivism as "the only authentic Yugoslav answer to punk".

=== 1984 ===
As the movement became more profiled in late 1983 and especially throughout 1984—with the emergence of Zabranjeno Pušenje's debut album and start of Top lista nadrealista on television—it began getting better notices in Yugoslav media.

In July 1984, rock critic Darko Glavan wrote a detailed opinion piece on New Primitivism in general as well as EJK&HM and Zabranjeno Pušenje specifically. Expressing mild approval, he outlines his personal acceptance of the movement: "If someone likes them, I'm not going to dissuade them, however, if someone doesn't like them, I'm not going to attempt convincing them otherwise". Furthermore, while noting new primitives are deserving of the media attention they had been receiving, he wonders whether the amount of publicity has become excessive because "they are terrific as an added flavourful spice to a developed and varied rock scene, but can hardly function as the dominant trend". Focusing on EJK&HM, he labels them "Bosnia's answer to Sha Na Na", before proclaiming them an acceptable form of entertainment for the general masses and a welcome break from incoherent art rock pretentiousness. Though further expressing skepticism whether this is still enough for a conventional rock career, citing EJK&HM's "unwillingness to freshen up their repetitive jokes and yucks" as a concern for their long term career prospects. Glavan is more upbeat about Pušenje, finding them to be "more musical, more talented, and in the context of an LP, simply stronger than EJK&HM". Comparing Pušenje to The Clash in addition to extolling their artistic ambition that "saves them from becoming one-dimensional caricatures and additionally invokes locally flavoured stylized neorealism of Emir Kusturica's Sjećaš li se Doli Bel?", Glavan feels that, despite occasionally failing to properly articulate their inventiveness, the band has a fresh voice and a couple of great tracks off their debut album.

=== 1985 ===
New Primitivism received a lot more press attention throughout early 1985 as the so-called "Marshal affair" raged in the country's media following Zabranjeno Pušenje frontman Nele Karajlić's supposed insulting pun about the death of Marshal Tito at the band's late November 1984 concert in Rijeka.

As part of his January 1985 article on the various aspects of Zabranjeno Pušenje's "Marshal affair" while the scandal was still unfolding and its outcome was very much in flux, rock critic Zlatko Gall included his observations about the band specifically and New Primitivism in general. Writing through the lens of the ongoing political scandal being litigated in the Yugoslav media and the court of public opinion, he summarizes the philosophy of New Primitivism's public activity as "possessing clear anti-intellectual traits, including glorification of the streetwise local noble savage via humour that plays to the cheap seats and as such straddles the thin line between allusion on one side and vulgarity and repugnance on the other". Gall continues by opining that Zabranjeno Pušenje's debut album Das ist Walter "mostly lands on the right side of that line despite the band's crudeness and various deficiencies that they managed to turn into an advantage" before lauding it further, just like Glavan did six months earlier, for "successfully evoking and re-creating the atmosphere of Kusturica's Sjećaš li se Doli Bel?", which Gall sees as a "film that in addition to stirring up nostalgia also awakened the consciousness of young Sarajevans about their own (new primitive) identity". The journalist concludes that Zabranjeno Pušenje thus set the stage for a career such as Buldožer's, but that its enormous success "facilitated by the euphoria around the new primitive Top lista nadrealista" over the past year "often pushed the band to the wrong side of the vulgarity line during their live shows at which point it's only a small step to the distasteful remark and the unsuccessful joke about an American amplifier".

Against the backdrop of the "Marshall affair" shifting into a higher gear that saw Zabranjeno Pušenje and New Primitivism essentially proscribed from public activity in various parts of Yugoslavia—with a plethora of canceled Zabranjeno Pušenje gigs, radio playlist bans for their songs, removal of Top lista nadrealista from the Sarajevo radio and television, a legal case being opened against Karajlić, etc.—film critic and columnist Bogdan Tirnanić wrote a long-form piece in March 1985 that uses the phenomenon of New Primitivism as jumping-off point for criticism of Yugoslavia's top-down policies in arts and culture. Observing the movement being snuffed out on political grounds and removed from sight immediately after it had been afforded enormous media attention, Tirnanić offers personal support to the beleaguered new primitives by stating he "believes young Karajlić's version of events that what they actually meant was really just the damn amplifier". The writer then posits that "even though it will at some future point in time be completely irrelevant whether these kids had blurted out what's being ascribed to them, none of it affects the essence of the matter because even if this public investigation centered around what Karajlić meant by his Rijeka on-stage quip hadn't been launched the way it had been, as a third-hand one-guy-told-me-so account, the whole new primitive thing was always going to be bitterly dealt with in one way or another". Before expounding on this claim, Tirnanić steps back to offer his views on the creative merits of New Primitivism, proclaiming it "without a doubt one of the biggest media and cultural attractions of 1984 that appeared as a local subcultural philosophy in reaction to the early 1980s Belgrade, Zagreb, and Ljubljana respective rock'n'roll milieus once those cities' punk and new wave scenes began to diminish" and summing it up as a "unique and simple program that outright eliminates the danger of ever becoming, even unconsciously or by chance, an epigone of a global trend due to affirming the distinctive cultural content originating from an authentic natural resource—homo balcanicus—with its wide range of socio-folkloric characteristics: from pulling a čakija to optional personal hygiene". Tirnanić continues by remarking that "it's not always easy to tell whether dr. Nele Karajlić and Elvis J. Kurtović are skewering the characters they narrate about, lampooning them with an ironic campy distance or they genuinely hoist them up to be admired as unique individuals thoroughly cleansed of any traces of civilization outside of the Balkan experience". The writer feels that "which of the two attitudes the new primitive performers end up taking towards their characters seems to vary from situation to situation while they're probably wishing they could have it both ways at the same time" though adding that "they generally do play it with ironic distance more often than straight, but mostly out of necessity in order to make their fairly thin material, in terms of duration and quantity, last a little longer". Tirnanić then turns his attention specifically to the movement's most popular offerings: Top lists nadrealista and Zabranjeno Pušenje's Das ist Walter. When it comes to Top lists nadrealista's 1984 series, though considering it a "welcome breath of fresh air on stale Yugoslav television", the writer also feels that "its socialist-camp style is some twenty years too late after Jovan Ristić's early 1960s plays in DADOV and Komarac cabaret".

== Legacy ==
New Primitivism was primarily a fuckabout that got taken a little too seriously in the end. It was created as our answer to global musical trends that the Western music industry had been manufacturing and launching in regular intervals in order to sell more records. Whenever there's a lull in sales, the industry comes up with something called, say, New Romanticism, for example. And then, a band appears and it's called Ultravox, for example, so we all cut our hair like Ultravox and we buy that thing for a year or year and a half. And then it's time for New Something Else, and the same cycle is repeated over again..... As sensitive and receptive consumers of pop-culture, we quickly realized the whole thing is a sham so we decided to "join" the musical industry by coming up with our own movement. New Primitivism would've been genius had it been taken over and fostered by a serious conceptual artist willing to invest at least as much energy in it as those Slovenian dudes did in their Neue Slowenische Kunst. However, speaking objectively, that was always going to be an impossibility because the NSK guys took their thing seriously while we never got past the fucking around stage..... I should also add that the biggest difference between New Primitivism and NSK was the fact that "old primitivism" tangibly existed while the "Altslowenische Kunst", strictly speaking, never did.

— Nele Karajlić in 2012 on whether New Primitivism was a political or cultural movement.

New Primitivism as a sub-cultural movement retained prominence well after its official 1987 demise.

Sarajevo-born-and-raised novelist Miljenko Jergović referenced New Primitivism on many occasions in his literary output as a newspaper columnist, bringing it up fondly and in a positive light. His praise for the movement's protagonists covers a wide range: from applauding their contributions to Sarajevan civic pride to admiring the storytelling techniques and use of language in their songs and comedy sketches. In the early 1990s, he summarized New Primitivism as "a general cultural emancipatory movement that was supposed to rid the Bosnians of their eternal inferiority complex towards Zagreb and Belgrade". In a 2014 column, he explained the movement as "a gesture of self-irony, which served as a way for the city of Sarajevo to get out of its cultural cocoon and, for a short time at least, become the cultural capital of Yugoslavia" before adding that it also brought "a mockery of the [Yugoslav communist] regime and a complete carnivalization of everyday life while threading a fantastic ability to tell a 'small story' as well as provide tribute and homage through storytelling". Writing in 2017 about the language, style, and metaphorical associations used by the new primitives, Jergović saw all of it as "part of an artificial Sarajevan čaršija code these guys invented for the purpose of telling their stories and writing their songs, the same code that would eventually find its way to the city's streets and even into its intellectual salons—bullshit chambers of the new Sarajevan cultural and literary elite". Jergović furthermore exclaimed in the same piece that "the language in the early Top lista nadrealista and initial Zabranjeno Pušenje's and EJK&HM's albums had no bearing in reality as no one in the city of Sarajevo actually spoke that way", explaining it all as "a persiflage of sorts, a knowing self-mockery that assumed all kinds of embellishment". He concluded by saying that "what began as a persiflage soon ended up as a widely-accepted standard [in Yugoslavia] so much so that because of these few uniquely talented and humorous individuals, the gift of humour became a collective one in the sense that if the stereotype that Gypsies are good at singing and playing instruments is true, and if all Black people know how to dance and hold rhythm then everyone in Bosnia must be able to tell a joke and entertain a crowd".

In his scathing 1993 rebuke of the movement, Muhidin Džanko, a professor at the University of Sarajevo's Faculty of Philosophy, labeled New Primitivism an "exceptionally anti-Islamic movement" that "thanks to the charisma of its protagonists, managed to directly obstruct and even eliminate the national feelings of the Bosnian Muslim youth, majority of whom are proud members of the 'new primitive nation'". He furthermore saw the poetics of New Primitivism to be rooted in its specific language containing "supposed speech patterns and parlance of the Sarajevo čaršija and mahalas", before rejecting it as a "cheap trick meant to lampoon the traditional verbal expression of Sarajevo Muslims and degrade their Oriental lexicology".

Zoran "Cane" Kostić, the Partibrejkers frontman, wasn't a fan of New Primitivism; he brought it up in passing during a 1997 interview while looking back on his own band's early years and specifically recalling Plavi Orkestar's and Crvena Jabuka's mid-1980s Yugoslavia-wide breakout commercial success that had its springboard in Belgrade: "During the mid-1980s, the music scene in the city [of Belgrade] started popping again a bit and new bands began taking off. But, it was a bad trip. Bosnians (Plavi Orkestar and Crvena Jabuka) entered Belgrade sometime around 1986 right after these raucous new primitive guys set the stage for them. They were their Trojan Horses. I never got into that new primitive thing precisely because I saw something else in it. I mean, in the end, their dumb schtick made it possible for a band like Valentino to conquer Belgrade".

In his March 2000 Vreme piece about the disdain certain vociferous sections among the rock 'n' roll consumers and musicians in Serbia (particularly Belgrade-based ones with "blasé, elitist tastes") had continually been exhibiting towards popular and/or populist 1970s and 1980s Yugoslav rock'n'roll acts coming out of Bosnia, journalist Uroš Komlenović mostly focused on Goran Bregović and Bijelo Dugme being targets of such derision, but also, in passing, talked about New Primitivism receiving the same kind of criticism from same circles. Opining that it's not the new primitives' fault people [of Yugoslavia] took them seriously and began treating their satire as a behavioural manual, Komlenović simultaneously ridiculed what he saw to be a tendency among Belgrade urbanite hipsters to draw a distinction between Zabranjeno Pušenje and Top lista nadrealista (i.e. cooler-than-thou Belgraders seeing the former as a gateway to rural populism while nevertheless extolling the latter as cogent political and social analysis) despite both being created by more-or-less same people. Though not explicitly considering the ultra commercial Crvena Jabuka as a new primitive band (despite them having roots in New Primitivism) but rather as a "Bijelo Dugme clone alongside Merlin and Regina", Komlenović still managed to identify some quality among the band's creative output that "saves them from being outright dismissed as pandering schlock".

Once in a blue moon, I'll get a call from someone saying they're a researcher working at some university somewhere and they want to ask me questions about New Primitivism. My immediate reaction is to fuck with them. However, when they later send me a nicely bound hardcover book, I must say I'm filled with pride. Nothing gives me more satisfaction than seeing 30-year-old crap I wrote purely out of spite, indolence, or malevolence, now translated into English and dissected by serious people for deeper meaning.

— Elvis J. Kurtović in his 2013 online column on the interest New Primitivism has been getting from social scientific circles.

Appearing as a talking head in Druga strana rock'n'rolla, a HRT-financed 2011 documentary by Silvio Mirošničenko about censorship on the 1970s and 1980s Yugoslav music scene, rock critic Darko Glavan summarized his view of the political and ideological aspects of New Primitivism: "It's a fact that they were intentionally [politically] provocative, but they were also very careful to always signal their harmlessness to the [Yugoslav communist] system. Yes, they were 'naughty' here and there with humorously provocative statements, but ultimately they believed in the system. I never detected a radical rejection of the system with them like I did with Štulić or young Houra".

To many, New Primitivism gained added relevance in the context of the breakup of Yugoslavia. Books like 2013's Shake, Rattle and Roll: Yugoslav Rock Music and the Poetics of Social Critique written by Dalibor Mišina, assistant professor of sociology at Lakehead University, devote a significant portion to the study of New Primitivism's overall significance in the last decade of SFR Yugoslavia's existence, arguing that the country could've survived had it adopted values propagated by New Primitivism and similar genres as its new cultural model.

While mentioning New Primitivism in passing in a 2018 column about the folk rock band Nervozni Poštar, novelist Muharem Bazdulj likened the movement to a "mischievous kid who loves to test the patience of his parents, his teachers, and his school principal, but is not quite willing to go as far as doing something [really egregious] that would actually risk expulsion from the school" before concluding that "just like the Baroque ended up in Rococo so did New Primitivism end up in Nervozni Poštar" because "Nervozni Poštar appeared at a time when the aesthetic of New Primitivism practically became the dominant one in the Yugoslav public sphere and when fear of the [Yugoslav] cultural elite's disapproval was no longer present even in that form where it turns you on that the cultural elite finds you abhorrent".

== See also ==
- Elvis J. Kurtović & His Meteors
- Zabranjeno Pušenje
- Top lista nadrealista
- New Partisans
- SFR Yugoslav pop and rock scene
- Punk rock in Yugoslavia
- New wave music in Yugoslavia
