= Arapović =

Arapović is a mainly Croatian surname, but is also found among Bosniaks in lesser numbers. People with the name include:

- Borislav Arapović (born 1935), Bosnian-Croatian poet, linguist and literary scholar
- Faris Arapović (1970–2019), Bosnian drummer, member of Zabranjeno Pušenje and Sikter
- Franjo Arapović (born 1965), Croatian basketball player
- Husnija Arapović (1944–2022), Bosnian-Herzegovinian footballer
- Krešimir Arapović (1924–1994), Croatian footballer
- Marko Arapović (born 1996), Croatian basketball player
