= Zona Isključenja =

Bosnian rock band

- Zona Isključenja - Current Lineup

Background information
- Origin: Goražde, Bosnia and Herzegovina,
- Genres: Hard rock; progressive rock; Bosnian rock; new wave
- Years active: 1995—present
- Labels: Hayat Production
- Members: Admir Hurem; Dženan Hadžović; Senko Borovac; Jasmin Bešlija; Omar Softić

Zona Isključenja (trans. Exclusion Zone) is a Bosnian rock band, formed by group of friends in Goražde, Bosnia and Herzegovina.

Zona Isključenja was officially formed in 1995, although the members of the default lineup, drummer Jasmin Bešlija, keyboardist Dženan Hadžović and bass guitarist Senko Borovac, were previously active under the name "Paradox". The origin of the name came from UN resolution on Goražde during the Bosnian War as town was declared as the exclusion zone for the artillery weapons by the UN Security Council.

== History ==
At the beginning, the band was focused on rock ballads, playing at the various festivals of demo bands. They released their first album "Vakat je..." (trans. It's about time...) in 2006, eleven years after the band's foundation thus the symbolic title. They also released two music videos from this album for the songs "Ljubav" (trans. Love) and "Lijepa moja" (trans. My Beautiful). The second album 13. Soba (trans. thirteenth room) was released in 2008 with another two promo music videos for the songs "Boje jeseni" (trans. Colors of the autumn) and "Grad" (trans. The town).

After the second album, the band almost fully disappeared from the Bosnian music scene and finally returned with the new guitarist in 2012. Year after they released the returning single "Moj Svijet" (trans. My world) announcing that the band is back and working on new material,

The third album Trenutak, sat, godina (trans. The moment, an hour, a year) was released on 16 December 2016, under the same label as before Hayat Production along with the music video for the acoustic version of the song "Vila" (trans. The fairy).

== Members ==
- Senko Borovac - bass guitar
- Admir Hurem - vocals
- Jasmin Bešlija - drums
- Dženan Hadžović - keyboards
- Omar Softić - guitar (2012 - to date)

=== Ex Members ===
- Nihad "Kruger" Gluščić - guitar (1995-2012)
- Sanjin Šabanović - rhythm guitar (1997-2005)

== Discography ==
- Vakat je... (2006)
- 13. Soba (2008)
- Trenutak, sat, godina (2016)
