= Rock music in Bosnia and Herzegovina =

Rock music in Bosnia and Herzegovina mostly developed during the time when the country was part of socialist Yugoslavia.

The city of Sarajevo was, prior to the war, a center for Yugoslav rock music. Bands from this period included Plavi Orkestar, Bijelo Dugme, Indexi, Zabranjeno Pušenje, and Crvena Jabuka. Most of the bands in Sarajevo at the time were influenced by heavy metal pioneers such as Led Zeppelin, Queen, and Deep Purple. Punk music in Sarajevo was also influenced by major punk bands of the time, such as the Sex Pistols. Influenced by Bob Dylan, Kemal Monteno helped popularize folk rock. Goran Bregović was a renowned songwriter and brought his band, Bijelo Dugme, to popular acclaim across Central Europe. Psychedelic rock was taken control of by the pioneers of Bosnian rock Indexi.

Punk rock entered Bosnia from Slovenia, and it set roots in Sarajevo, Tuzla, and Mostar. Rock music was most dominant in Bosnia and Herzegovina out of all the states in Yugoslavia. Bijelo Dugme was probably the most legendary and influential band of the Balkans.

During the late 1990s and the early 2000s many new bands have formed. Mainly heavy metal and alternative bands like Sikter, Letu Štuke, Skroz, Zoster, Dubioza kolektiv, and famous alternative singer Elvir Laković Laka who represented Bosnia and Herzegovina at Eurovision.

== Present day ==
A prevailing theme in 21st century rock music culture of Bosnia and Herzegovina is that the rural-oriented, nationalistic elites have conquered and colonists the urban cultural space. Rock bands, by and large, have positioned themselves against the nationalists.

== See also ==
- Music of Bosnia and Herzegovina
- SFR Yugoslav Pop Rock scene
