= Campogalliani =

Campogalliani is an Italian surname. Notable people with the surname include:

- Carlo Campogalliani (1885–1974), Italian screenwriter, actor, and film director
- Ettore Campogalliani (1903–1992), Italian composer, musician, and teacher
