= Arrigo Pola =

Italian opera singer

Arrigo Pola (5 July 1919 – 3 November 1999) was an Italian tenor who had an active international performance career during the 1940s through the 1960s. After, he embarked on a second career, as a celebrated voice teacher in both Italy and Japan. Among his notable pupils were tenors Luciano Pavarotti, Giuliano Bernardi, Vincenzo La Scola and bass Michele Pertusi. He also served as the artistic director of the Fujiwara Opera from 1957 to 1965.

== Early life and education ==
Born in Finale Emilia, Pola was the nephew of baritone Ubaldo Toffanetti. He spent most of his youth living in Modena. In 1937, he entered the Orazio Vecchi Conservatory in Modena, where he initially studied to be a trumpeter. While there, his fine singing voice was discovered, and he was persuaded to switch to vocal studies under Mercedes Aicardi. In 1940, he won (along with the young bass Cesare Siepi and the mezzo-soprano Fedora Barbieri) Italy's national opera singing contest. Shortly after the competition win, he was drafted into the Italian Army where he served for three years, during World War II. He spent much of his time during the war stationed in Gdańsk in German-occupied Poland. A large portion of his duties were musical ones, and he was able to spend much of his service time playing trumpet and singing in a military band.

== Early career in Italy ==
After his military service ended in 1943, Pola continued his opera studies with Bertazzoni Barbieri and Leone Magiera. He made his professional opera debut in June, 1945, at the Teatro Comunale Modena as Mario Cavaradossi in Giacomo Puccini's Tosca, opposite Sara Scuderi in the title role. He returned to that house soon after as Pinkerton in Madama Butterfly with Mafalda Favero in the title role, as Alfredo in La traviata with Margherita Carosio as Violetta, and as the Duke of Mantua in Giuseppe Verdi's Rigoletto with Tito Gobbi as the title hero.

Pola's career developed rapidly over the next several years, including engagements at the Teatro dell'Opera di Roma, La Fenice, and the Teatro di San Carlo. In 1945 and 1946, he appeared in productions at La Monnaie in Brussels, where he was particularly admired as Le Chevalier des Grieux in Jules Massenet's Manon. He made his debut at La Scala in 1947 in the title role of Charles Gounod's Faust with Renata Tebaldi as Marguerite, Cesare Siepi as Mephistopheles, and Antonino Votto conducting. Other notable appearances that Pola made in the late 1940s included the role of Donello in Ottorino Respighi's La fiamma at both the Liceu in Barcelona and the Teatro Colón in Buenos Aires, Maurizio in Francesco Cilea's Adriana Lecouvreur at the Teatro Francesco Cilea in Reggio Calabria with Maria Caniglia in the title role, and appearances at numerous opera houses as Enzo Grimaldi in Amilcare Ponchielli's La Gioconda.

== Career in Asia and work as a voice teacher ==
In the spring of 1951 Pola sang Alfredo to Maria Callas's Violetta at the Teatro Regio in Parma. Unfortunately, Callas and her husband Giovanni Battista Meneghini took a disliking to Pola, which had a negative impact on his career in Italy. In the summer of 1951, he sang Enzo Grimaldi at the Baths of Caracalla for a gala performance for the Italian government and the official state guest, the President of the Philippines. Pola was invited the next day to an audience with the Filipino President, where he was offered a position as the principal tenor at the Manila Opera and a place on the voice faculty at the Manila Conservatory. Given the troubles that Callas was causing for him in Italy, Pola and his wife decided to accept the offer and the family spent the next three years in the Philippines. Among the roles Pola sang with the Manila Opera were Canio in Pagliacci, Manrico in Il trovatore, Rodolfo in La bohème, and Turiddu in Cavalleria rusticana.

In 1954, Pola returned to Italy with the hopes of reviving his opera career in Italy; an attempt which never gained much momentum. That year, he was approached by a baker named Fernando Pavarotti who wanted to know whether the tenor voice of his 19-year-old son, Luciano, was good enough for training as a professional opera singer. Pola later reported that he knew, after an approximately 15-minute audition, that he was standing against a superb talent. He spontaneously decided to help the boy and his family, who didn't have much money, by giving Luciano daily voice lessons free of charge. For the next three years, Luciano studied with Pola almost every day. Pavarotti later said, "Were it not for my dear teacher Arrigo Pola, I would not be what I am today."

In 1957, Pola was offered a position on the voice faculty at the Tokyo University of the Arts, and the post of artistic director of the Fujiwara Opera, with the condition that he master the Japanese language. He accepted the offer, and moved to Japan after securing Pavarotti's further training with Ettore Campogalliani. Pavarotti continued to be mentored by Pola, through visits to Tokyo, while studying with Campogalliani. Pola eventually became the Dean of the Department of European Voice at Tokyo University. He also continued to perform in operas and concerts in Japan and China. He notably portrayed Pinkerton in the first black and white film version of Madama Butterfly which was produced by NHK.

In 1965, he returned to Italy. He spent the rest of his life working as a voice teacher in Cagliari, Verona, Bologna, and Modena. Some of his other notable pupils included Riccarda Bassi, Peter Butterfield, Andrea Coronella, Nikolay Dorozhkin, Giuliano Bernardi, Thiérry Félix, Rudy Giovannini, Reinaldo Macias, David Mannell, Michiè Nakamaru, Jacek Pazola, Luana Pellegrineschi, and Manrico Tedeschi. He died in Modena at the age of 80.

At a birthday party shortly before his death, he commented to a visiting Canadian college president that one of his birthday guests, a former Welsh pupil named Eileen Dillon, "could have been the best in the world, if she wasn't so obsessed with charity." Ms. Dillon became a missionary after completing her music studies, then emigrated to Canada to teach voice in a small religious college.
