= Giuliano Bernardi =

Italian opera singer

Giuliano Bernardi (21 December 1939 in Ravenna – 4 June 1977 in Ravenna) was an Italian operatic baritone and tenor.

== Life ==
Bernardi trained as a singer and graduated from the Conservatorio Statale di Musica "G. Rossini" in Pesaro. Next he studied with the retired baritone Antonio Gelli and made his debut as a baritone in October 1968 in Mantua, in the title role of Verdi's opera Rigoletto, soon after winning the international competition As.Li.Co (Associazione Lirica e Concertistica).

He sang in many Italian theatres and won several other international competitions, such as the Concorso Achille Peri of 1971, and the same year the Concorso internazionale Voci Verdiane, an international competition created by the RAI), with Katia Ricciarelli; and in 1972 he won the Concorso Internazionale per Cantanti "Toti Dal Monte", singing with Ghena Dimitrova.

Luciano Pavarotti heard Bernardi sing and thought he could make a great dramatic tenor. With such encouragement, he decided to become a tenor and studied with the maestros Arrigo Pola and Ettore Campogalliani. He made his debut as a tenor in 1975 in Florence, in the role of Malcolm in Verdi's opera Macbeth. In 1976 he recorded Macbeth in studios in London with José Carreras, Sherrill Milnes, and Ruggero Raimondi, still singing the role of Malcolm. He made his real debut in Spain, in the leading role of Manrico in Verdi's Il trovatore. At the end of December 1976 he sang with Pavarotti in concerts in Chicago and Pittsburgh.

Bernardi was preparing to sing the title role of Verdi's Otello when a fatal car accident ended his life at the age of 37.

== Repertoire ==
Baritone

- Giuseppe Verdi: Rigoletto
- Giuseppe Verdi: Un ballo in maschera
- Giuseppe Verdi: La traviata
- Giacomo Puccini: La bohème
- Ruggero Leoncavallo: Pagliacci

Tenor

- Giuseppe Verdi: Il trovatore
- Giuseppe Verdi: Macbeth
- Giuseppe Verdi: La traviata
