= Vakat je... =

Studio album by Zona Iskljuchenja
- Released: 2006
- Studio: Pavarotti Music Centre in Mostar
- Genre: Rock; Reggae; Hard rock; Ethno
- Label: Hayat Production

Zona Iskljuchenja chronology
| Vakat je... (2006) | 13. Soba; (2008) |

Singles from Vakat je...
- 1. "Ljubav"; 2. "Lijepa Moja"

Vakat je... (Its about time...) is the first studio album by Bosnian rock band Zona Iskljuchenja, released on July 7, 2006, by Hayat Production. The album was released after 11 years since the foundation of the band, thus the symbolic title "Its about time...".

Material was recorded in three different studios during the long period of time, therefore various music genre and different influences could be noticed while listening. "Appearance of Zona Iskljuchenja with "Vakat je..." is the most beautiful rock story coming from the province" - said Milan Sokolivic from the Federalni Radio in the long radio interview with the band on December 22, 2016.

The band released two music videos from this albums for the songs "Ljubav" ("Love") and "Lijepa moja' ("My Beautiful") and made significant breakthrough on the Bosnian rock scene. The album contains 10 songs with relatively various music genre and was considered to be the breakthrough point for the albums to come. Vakat je... became the first studio album released by any music band from Gorazde.

== Track listing ==
| No. | Title | Writer(s) | Length |
|---|---|---|---|
| 1. | "Ljubav" | Music: Senko Borovac, Lyrics:Aldina Medija | 4:41 |
| 2. | "Bez Odraza" | Music: Dženan Hadžović, Lyrics: Aldina Medija | 2:51 |
| 3. | "Jutro Mijenja Sve" | Music: Senko Borovac, Lyrics:Aldina Medija | 2:56 |
| 4. | "Ikar" | Music: Dženan Hadžović, Lyrics: Jasmin Šišić, Dženan Hadžović | 3:43 |
| 5. | "Putnik" | Music: Dženan Hadžović, Lyrics: Jasmin Šišić, Dženan Hadžović | 3:56 |
| 6. | "Oči moje" | Music: Dženan Hadžović | 4:18 |
| 7. | "Dok se skrivaš" | Music: Dženan Hadžović, Lyrics: Jasmin Šišić, Dženan Hadžović | 3:41 |
| 8. | "Lijepa Moja" | Music: Senko Borovac, Lyrics:Jasmin Bešlija | 3:55 |
| 9. | "Ništa Dobro" | Music: Dženan Hadžović, Lyrics: Dženan Hadžović | 4:26 |
| 10. | "Na Kraju" | Music: Senko Borovac, Lyrics:Aldina Medija | 3:11 |
