= Antonio Carangelo =

Italian operatic tenor

Antonio Laudino Carangelo (born 3 April 1948) is an Italian operatic tenor.

Carangelo was born in Alliste in the south of Italy. He received his musical training at the Conservatoire de Musique de Genève and the Accademia d'arte lirica in Osimo, Italy, and perfected his vocal technique through further studies with Mario del Monaco and Ettore Campogalliani, who was also the teacher of Luciano Pavarotti, Mirella Freni, and Renata Tebaldi.

He made his professional debut as Nemorino in L'elisir d'amore at the Opéra Théâtre de Saint-Étienne in 1979. He went on to sing leading tenor roles with opera companies in France, Switzerland, England, Italy and the USA. His repertoire includes Verdi's Rigoletto, La traviata, Simon Boccanegra, Ernani and Macbeth; Puccini's Tosca, La bohème, Madama Butterfly, Gianni Schicchi and Il tabarro; Donizetti's Lucia di Lammermoor and L'elisir d'amore; Mascagni's L'amico Fritz; Massenet's Werther; and Mozart's Don Giovanni. Carangelo has also performed many operettas, recitals and concerts and has a wide repertoire of traditional Italian and Neapolitan songs.

In recent years he also dedicated himself to vocal coaching. He founded his own singing school in Vienna, the Carangelo Academy, and gives master classes throughout Europe. Amongst his students are soloists at the Vienna State Opera, Salzburg Festival, Deutsche Oper Berlin, Royal Opera House Covent Garden, La Fenice in Venice, and the Teatro Colón in Buenos Aires.
