= Trenutak, sat, godina =

Studio album by Zona Iskljuchenja
- Released: 2016
- Studio: Pavarotti Music Centrein Mostar
- Genre: Rock; Reggae; Hard rock; Ethno Rock
- Label: Hayat Production
- Producer: Saša Karabatak, Marin Meštrović

Zona Iskljuchenja chronology
13. Soba; (2008)	Trenutak, sat, godina (2016)

Singles from Trenutak, sat, godina
- 1. "Moj Svijet" Released: 2014; 2. "Vila Unplugged" Released: 2016

Trenutak, Sat, Godina (trans. the moment, an hour, a year) is the third studio album by Bosnian rock band Zona Iskljuchenja (trans. Exclusion Zone), released on December 16, 2016, by Hayat Production.

The title of the album is marginally corrected title of the song listed among the tracks, and the title symbolizes how fast the life is passing by. The cover-art designer and the band member Dženan Hadžović tried to explain it by presenting the life with human candle. This album came after the 8 year long discography lapse. Since the band got the new guitarist in winter 2012, they immediately started with the work on this material and released an early single "Moj Svijet" (trans. My World) on March 14, 2013, announcing return to the Bosnian rock scene. The following three years the band was recording material in Pavarotti Studio in Mostar, but still continued cooperation with Bosnian producer Marin Mestrovic, who worked with the band on previous two albums, to do the final touch in mastering and postproduction. The album was unveiled on December 16, 2016, with a promo concert in Sarajevo.

Trenutak, sat, godina contains 9 songs that sound much more compact than the previous album, and the band members described that as "the maturity of the band". Just before the album promotion date, Zona Iskljuchenja released announced the single and music video for "Vila Unplugged" (trans. The fairy - unplugged), an acoustic version of the song that was published on the previous album. The both music videos from this album is signed and produced by the band's photographer and friend Edin Dzeko, who also participated during recordings of the material, even singing some back-vocals.

== Track listing ==
No.	Title	Writer(s)	Length
1.	"Zauvijek mlad"	Music: Senko Borovac, Lyrics: Senko Borovac	4:07
2.	"Sve što tebe dotakne"	Music: Senko Borovac, Lyrics: Senko Borovac	2:50
3.	"Vila Unplugged"	Music: Dženan Hadžović, Lyrics: Dženan Hadžović	3:37
4.	"Kad sakriju nas bore"	Music: Senko Borovac, Dženan Hadžović, Lyrics: Senko Borovac, Dženan Hadžović	2:55
5.	"Moj Svijet"	Music: Senko Borovac, Lyrics: Dženan Hadžović	4:41
6.	"Priča"	Music: Dženan Hadžović, Lyrics: Vedad Kuljuh	2:58
7.	"Ginger"	Music: Dženan Hadžović, Lyrics: Dženan Hadžović	3:44
8.	"Sav taj smrad"	Music: Senko Borovac, Lyrics: Senko Borovac	2:32
9.	"Trenutak, sat il' godina"	Music: Senko Borovac, Lyrics: Senko Borovac	3:37
