= Yoshie Fujiwara =

Japanese opera singer (1898-1976)

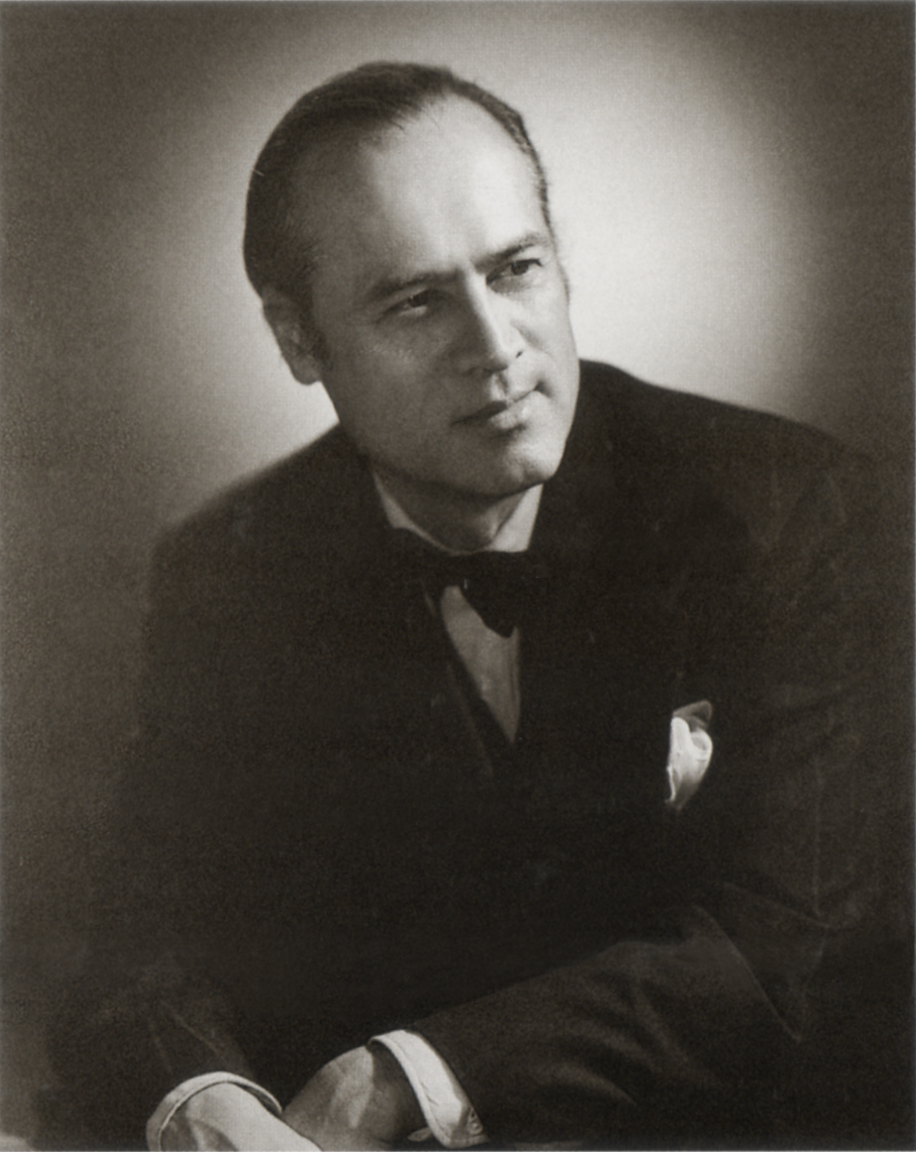
- Born: December 5, 1898; Osaka, Japan
- Died: March 22, 1976 (aged 77); Tokyo
- Other names: 藤原義江, 戸山英二郎、水野義江
- Occupation: singer (tenor)

Yoshie Fujiwara (藤原 義江, Fujiwara Yoshie; December 5, 1898 in Osaka, Japan – March 22, 1976) was a Japanese tenor singer.

== Biography ==
He was born in Osaka. His mother Kinu Sakata was a biwa-player and a geisha, worked in Shimonoseki of Yamaguchi Prefecture. Her mother was born in Osaka too. His father, Neil Brodie Reid, (November 30, 1870 – January 19, 1920) a Scottish merchant, worked for Holme Ringer & Co., however he was not raised by his father. Tokuzaburō Fujiwara adopted him, from whom he received the family name "Fujiwara". Even so, his true father met him later in his life and put Yoshie into school. Yoshie's mother died in his youth, and Reid remained a bachelor all his life. Reid's grave is in Shimonoseki and Reid's boarding house later became the "Fujiwara Yoshie Memorial Museum".

In 1934, he established the Fujiwara Opera and became a notable figure of Japanese opera history.
