= Ego Trip (Sikter album) =

Studio album by Sikter
- Released: 2 June 2009
- Recorded: From 2006 to 2009 at MML Studio in Sarajevo
- Genre: Alternative rock, soul, funk
- Length: 43:37
- Label: Hayat Production
- Producer: Enes Zlatar, Đani Pervan

Sikter chronology
My Music (2005)	Ego Trip (2009)

Ego Trip is the fourth studio album by Bosnian alternative rock band Sikter. It was released on 2 June 2009 by one of the biggest music labels in Bosnia and Herzegovina, Hayat Production. The single "Line" (Edith Piaf 3)" accompanied its release.

Recording of the album began in 2006 and lasted until 2009 at MML Studio in Sarajevo. Producers of album were front-man of the band Enes Zlatar and the drummer of Bosnian band Letu Štuke, Đani Pervan. After a few years of experimenting with many genres, this album was alternative rock oriented with elements of funk and soul.

== Composition ==
Sarajevo-x.com thought that the album's sound was noticeably different compared to Sikter's previous recordings, but still recognizable as Sikter, featuring "heavy guitar riffs, solid rhythm section, pumping bass, penetrating keyboards.

Zlatar, Sikter's vocalist, explained the name of the album: "I think the whole world is on an ego trip, from the capitalists who imposed it on us to those who are fighting against them. I think it's time to become more socially oriented."

== Track listing ==
No.	Title	Lyrics	Length
1.	"Ego Trip"	E. Zlatar	5:28
2.	"You Think"	E. Zlatar	3:36
3.	"Edit Piaf III"	E. Zlatar, D. Rokvić, N. Zlatar	4:12
4.	"Out of Fashion"	E. Zlatar, D. Rokvić	3:33
5.	"Look Inside"	E. Zlatar, D. Rokvić, L. Šarić	5:16
6.	"We're All Same"	E. Zlatar, D. Rokvić, D. Vranić	5:18
7.	"Just Another Day"	E. Zlatar, D. Rokvić, E. Bratović	3:28
8.	"Tonight Is Forever" (2009 Version)	E. Zlatar	4:39
9.	"Wroyle"	D. Rokvić, D. Džihan	8:10
10.	"I'll Be Waiting"	E. Zlatar, M. Alifakić	5:00
Total length:			43:37

== Personnel ==
Sikter

- Enes Zlatar, vocals, keyboards, programming, producer
- Esad Bratović – guitars
- Dragan Rokvić – bass, vocals
- Igor Čamo – keyboards
- Nedim Zlatar – drums, keyboards, programming
- Leonardo Šarić – backing vocals, keyboards, programming
- Dejan Kajević – backing vocals

Production

- Đani Pervan – producer, mastering
