= Vincenzo La Scola =

Italian opera singer (1958–2011)

Vincenzo La Scola

Vincenzo La Scola (26 January 1958 – 15 April 2011) was an Italian tenor who had a successful international opera career for more than 25 years. He was particularly admired for his portrayals in operas by Giuseppe Verdi, Giacomo Puccini, Gaetano Donizetti, and Vincenzo Bellini. He also achieved success as a crossover artist, particularly in his many collaborations with singer-songwriter Cliff Richard and for his solo crossover album for EMI, Vita Mia (1999). In 2000 he was made a UNICEF Goodwill Ambassador, and from 2004 until his sudden death in 2011 he served as principal teacher and artistic director of the Accademia Verdi Toscanini in Parma.

== Career ==
La Scola was born in Palermo, Italy, and studied singing with Arrigo Pola, Carlo Bergonzi, and Rodolfo Celletti. In 1982 he won the Alessandro Ziliano Award at the Vico Verdiane Competition. He made his professional opera debut in 1983 at the Teatro Regio in Parma as Ernesto in Gaetano Donizetti's Don Pasquale. His career developed rapidly, and by 1989 he had already performed in leading roles at the Cologne Opera House (debut 1985), the Festival Puccini (debut in 1987 as Rinuccio in Puccini's Gianni Schicchi), La Fenice (debut in 1987 as Tonio in Donizetti's La fille du régiment), La Monnaie (debut in 1984 as Nemorino in L'elisir d'amore), the Kiel Opera House (debut 1985), the Opéra-Comique (debut in 1987 as Rinuccio), the Opéra Royal de Wallonie (debut 1984), the Ravenna Festival (debut in 1989, Alfredo in La Traviata), the Teatro Comunale di Bologna (debut in 1988, Arlecchino Battocchio in Mascagni's Le maschere), the Teatro Regio in Turin (debut in 1988), and La Scala (debut in 1988 as Nemorino). In 1986 he made his first three recordings: the tenor soloist in Rossini's Petite messe solennelle for Erato Records, and two full-length opera releases, Franco Battiato's Genesi and Bellini's Beatrice di Tenda.

Several more invitations to appear at other important houses continued in the early 1990s, including the Royal Opera, London (debut in 1990, Rodolfo in La bohème); the Teatro Carlo Felice (debut in 1990, Rodolfo); the Macerata Opera (debut in 1990, Rodolfo); the San Francisco Opera (debut in 1991 as Tebaldo in I Capuleti e i Montecchi); the Teatro di San Carlo (debut 1991 as Gennaro in Lucrezia Borgia); the Teatro dell'Opera di Roma (debut 1991 as the Duke of Mantua in Rigoletto): the Hamburg State Opera (debut 1991); the Arena di Verona Festival (debut 1992); the Vienna State Opera (debut 1992); and the Metropolitan Opera (debut in 1993 as Rodolfo).

In 2006, La Scola appeared at the 20th anniversary concert of the Suntory Hall in Japan. During this concert, in addition to singing, he also demonstrated his flute-playing ability, including an instrumental rendition of "Casta Diva" on the flute.

La Scola continued to appear regularly on the stages of the world's best opera houses up until his death of a sudden heart attack in Turkey in 2011. Other roles in his repertoire included Cavaradossi in Tosca, Edgardo in Lucia di Lammermoor, Gabriele Adorno in Simon Boccanegra, Pinkerton in Madama Butterfly, Pollione in Norma, Radamès in Aida, Riccardo in Un ballo in maschera, and the title roles in Roberto Devereux, Don Carlos, and The Tales of Hoffmann among others.

== Death ==
Vincenzo La Scola died at the age of 53 on 15 April 2011 in Mersin, Turkey due to a heart attack.

== Discography ==
=== Albums ===
- 1999: Vita Mia

=== Singles ===
- 1999: "Vita Mia" (with Cliff Richard)
