= Fujiwara Opera =

Japanese opera company

Fujiwara Opera Company
- 藤原歌劇団
- Founded: 1934
- Founder: Yoshie Fujiwara
- Headquarters: Tokyo, Japan
- Website: Official Website of the Japan Opera Foundation

The Fujiwara Opera (藤原歌劇団, Fujiwara Kagekidan) is an opera company based in Tokyo. Founded in 1934, it is Japan's first and oldest professional opera company.

== Historical overview ==
The Fujiwara Opera Company was founded in 1934 by operatic tenor Yoshie Fujiwara, who was the company's first director. Following World War II the company entered a period of great success, beginning with a highly popular production of Giuseppe Verdi's La traviata which was given more than 400 performances under the baton of German conductor Manfred Gurlitt. In December 1943 the company staged Beethoven's Fidelio to mark the troupe's 10th anniversary.

Members of the company sang roles in Madama Butterfly in the United States in 1952 and 1953, in a joint production with the New York City Opera. In a review for The New York Times, critic Howard Taubman praised the 1952 production's "remarkable delicacy" and "special warmth". In 1956, the company performed at the Brooklyn Academy of Music, toured the United States and Canada, and appeared on an episode of The Ed Sullivan Show. Members of the troupe in this period included Tatsuo Saitō, Eiko Kuwabara, Satoshi Nakamura, and Michiko Sunahara.

Renowned tenor Arrigo Pola was the company's Artistic Director between 1957 and 1965. After he left the company went into a period of decline, but eventually the company began to thrive again beginning in the late 1970s. Since 1981 the company has been managed by the Japan Opera Foundation, an organization which also manages the Nihon Opera Kyokai.
