= My Music (album) =

Studio album by Sikter
- Released: 21 August 2005
- Recorded: From 2003 to 2005 at MML Studio in Sarajevo
- Genre: Alternative rock, soul, funk
- Length: 48:28
- Label: Gramofon (GCD1007)
- Producer: Enes Zlatar, Edin Zubčević

Sikter chronology
Queen of the Disco (2002)	My Music (2005)	Ego Trip (2009)

Singles from My Music
- 1. "Don't You Miss Me" Released: 27 May 2005

My Music is the third and most successful studio album by Bosnian alternative rock band Sikter. It was released on 21 August 2005 by Bosnian label Gramofon. Album was recorded from 2003 to 2005 at MML Studio in Sarajevo and mixed at MGKS Studio in Sarajevo 2005. Cover of album was made by bassist of the band Dragan Rokvić.

Sikter had great success with this album and they won "Best Music Video" award on Davorin Music Awards 2006 for music video of title song "My Music". Critical reception was mostly positive and this album was supported by the DVD My Documents.

== Release ==
The first and only single taken from the album, "Don't You Miss Me", was released on 27 May 2005. It was written and produced by Enes Zlatar and Dragan Rokvić. Except original version there are three remixes of the song, remixed and produced by Bosnian artists: Edward EQ, DJ Ahmaad, Basheskia and Branski.

The music video for the song features Ibrahim Spahić and his son Mirsad. Video is about relationship between father and son and the generation gap. Father try to connect with his son but it's not simple as he thinks. It was directed by Timur Makarević and produced by pro.ba. Video was recorded on Igman mountain. Video premiere was on May 19, 2005 on Bosnian national television BHT1.

"My Music" was released on the compilation Eurosonic 2006.

== Track listing ==
No.	Title	Lyrics	Length
1.	"(Edit) Piaf II – I Can See Now"	E. Zlatar	4:51
2.	"Don't You Miss Me"	E. Zlatar, D. Rokvić	3:59
3.	"My Music"	E. Zlatar, D. Rokvić	3:51
4.	"Liar"	E. Zlatar	4:09
5.	"Get On Up 'n' Dance"	E. Zlatar	4:33
6.	"Feeling"	E. Zlatar	3:04
7.	"10 to 24th"	E. Zlatar	5:54
8.	"Open Your Eyes"	E. Zlatar	6:19
9.	"S. N. O. B."	E. Zlatar	3:58
10.	"Having Seen The Going Down (Look Upon The Coming Up)"	E. Zlatar	4:59
11.	"Talk To Me"	E. Zlatar	2:51
Total length:			48:28

== Personnel ==
Sikter

- Enes Zlatar Bure, vocals, keyboards, programming, producer, mixing
- Esad Bratović - guitars
- Dejan Rokvić - bass, vocals, art
- Igor Čamo - keyboards, mixing
- Nedim Zlatar - drums

Additional musicians

- Dunja Galineo - additional vocals
- Maja Hodžić - additional vocals
- Darko Poljak - saxophone
- DJ Ahmaad - scratching

Production

- Edin Zupčević - producer, mixing, mastering
- Boris Pavlović - mixing
- Ajna Zlatar - design
