= 13. Soba =

Studio album by Zona Iskljuchenja
- Released: 2008
- Studio: Amadeus Studio in Sarajevo
- Genre: Rock; Reggae; Hard rock; Ethno Rock
- Label: Hayat Production
- Producer: Marin Mestrovic

Zona Iskljuchenja chronology
| Vakat je... (2006) | 13. Soba; (2008) | Trenutak, sat, godina (2016) |

Singles from 13. Soba
- 1. "Boje Jeseni" Released: 2007; 2. "Grad" Released: 2008

13. Soba... (trans. 13th room) is the second studio album by Bosnian rock band Zona Iskljuchenja (trans. Exclusion Zone), released on November 13, 2008, by Hayat Production.

Number "13" in the title was symbolizing period of the band's existence, while "room" was referred to the state of mind, closing into own room, into the own exclusion zone.
On this album, band turned their trust to the producer Marin Mestrovic, who worked on mastering and postproduction on the first album. Therefore, this material was completely recorded, mixed and produced in Marin's owned studio "Amadeus" and unlike the previous album, songs were more balanced, in hard rock genre with elements of Bosnian folklore and modern sounds

Zona released an early single and music video "Boje jeseni" (trans. colors of autumn), an acoustic song that presented the band in completely different environment. Upon release of the album, Zona has published yet another music video "Grad" ("the town").
The album contains 13 songs with few curiosities. Track No.8 called "Tisina" (trans. silence) is actually 13 seconds of silence, and the following track is called "Poslusaj pjesmu pod rednim brojem 8" (trans. listen to the song under the track number 8), which is the only song that is motivated by the bad socio-political situation in post-war Bosnia and Herzegovina
Just like on the previous album, this one also contains Zona's rock version of yet another Bosnian sevdalinka, Emina.

== Track listing ==
| No. | Title | Writer(s) | Length |
|---|---|---|---|
| 1. | "Sueno de Guitarra" | instrumental by: Bole | 1:41 |
| 2. | "Spanija" | Music: Senko Borovac, Lyrics: Senko Borovac | 3:17 |
| 3. | "Novo Vrijeme" | Music: Senko Borovac, Lyrics:Senko Borovac | 3:37 |
| 4. | "Emina" | sevdalinka Lyrics: Aleksa Šantić | 5:17 |
| 5. | "Grad" | Music: Senko Borovac, Lyrics: Senko Borovac | 3:32 |
| 6. | "Prvi i posljednji dan" | Music: Dženan Hadžović, Lyrics: Dženan Hadžović | 3:04 |
| 7. | "Super Mario" | Music: Senko Borovac, Lyrics: Senko Borovac | 3:19 |
| 8. | "Tisina" | | 0:13 |
| 9. | "Poslusaj pjesmu pod red.br. 8" | Music: Senko Borovac, Lyrics: Senko Borovac, Dženan Hadžović | 3:10 |
| 10. | "Sam" | Music: Dženan Hadžović, Lyrics: Dženan Hadžović | 3:46 |
| 11. | "Vila" | Music: Dženan Hadžović, Lyrics: Dženan Hadžović | 3:52 |
| 12. | "Klaun" | Music: Dženan Hadžović, Lyrics: Dženan Hadžović | 3:34 |
| 13. | "Boje jeseni" | Music: Senko Borovac, Lyrics: Senko Borovac | 4:31 |
