= Gramofon =

- Founded: 2003
- Genre: Jazz, classical, alternative rock, world, electronic
- Country of origin: Bosnia and Herzegovina
- Location: Sarajevo, Bosnia and Herzegovina
- Official website: www.gramofon.ba

Gramofon is a record label and event agency founded in Sarajevo, Bosnia and Herzegovina in 2003. It is the biggest music label of alternative music in Bosnia and Herzegovina.

Since 2003, Gramofon has organized more than 200 concerts and music events. It is also the organizer of the Sarajevo Jazz Festival and Xenophonia festival.

Gramofon is the exclusive distributor for Bosnia and Herzegovina of the labels ECM Records, Enja Records, ACT Music, Doublemoon Records, Pi Recordings, ESC Records, and Intakt Records.

== Discography ==
Catalog number	Artist	Title	Type	Year
GCD1001	Adi Lukovac	Remake	Soundtrack	2003
GCD2001	Emina Zečaj	Traditional Bosnian Songs	Album	2003
GCD1002	Dubioza Kolektiv	Dubioza Kolektiv	Album	2004
GCD1003	Basheskia	Postcard from Sunny Neighbourhood	EP	2004
GCD1004	Dubioza Kolektiv	Open Wide	EP	2004
GDVD9001	Haris Pašović	A Propos de Sarajevo	DVD	2004
GCD1005	Marimanga Trio and Bojan Zulfikarpašić	Marimanga Trio	Album	2004
GCD3001	Sonemus	Spatial Intersections	Album	2005
GCD1006	Minority	Ninja on the Roof	Album	2005
GCD1007	Sikter	Don't You Miss Me	Single	2005
GCD1008	Zoster	Ojužilo	Album	2005
GCD1009	Sikter	My Music	Album	2005
GCD1011	Basheskia	23/23	Album	2006
GCD1012	Dubioza Kolektiv	Dubnamite	Album	2006
GCD1013	Dejan Terzić	Underground	Album	2006
GCD1014	Validna Legitimacija	Mesijanski sindrom	Album	2006
GCD1015	Zoster	Festival budala	Album	2007
GCD1010	Various singer	Unpopular singles	Compilation	2007
GCD3002	Sanel Redžić	Sanel Redžić	Album	2007
GDVD9002	Sikter	My Documents	DVD	2007
GCD1002	Dubioza Kolektiv	Dubioza Kolektiv	Album	2007
GCD1016	Underground	Continuum	Album	2008
GCD2002	Emina Zečaj	Emina Zečaj	Album	2008
GCD1017	Amira Medunjanin and Merima Ključo	Zumra	Album	2009
GCD1018	Amira Medunjanin	Live	Live album	2009
GCD1019	Damir Imamović	Damir Imamović	Album	2010
PGCD2301	Basheskia and Edward EQ	Para-svega+para=hvala lijepo	Album	2010
GCD1020	Validna Legitimacija	Can I Play with Your Memories?	Album	2010
GCD4001	Burhan Šaban	Tebe trebam	Album	2011
GCD1021	Zoster	Imači kada	Album	2011
GCD1022	Halka	Halka	Album	2013
GCD1023	Zoster	Srce uzavrelo	Album	2014
GCD1024	Halka	O ljubavi	Album	2014
GCD1025	Božo Vrećo	Moj sevdah	Album	2014
