= Michele Pertusi =

Italian opera singer (born 1965)

Michele Pertusi is an Italian opera singer (bass) born in Parma on January 12, 1965.

He studied at the Conservatory of Parma with Mauro Uberti, and obtained an advanced degree in singing and piano. He also followed the teaching of Carlo Bergonzi, Arrigo Pola and Rodolfo Celetti. He began his career on December 19, 1984, at the municipal theater of Modena with the role of Silva in Ernani, at only 19 years old, after winning the "voci verdiane" competition. He quickly sang on the great Italian (Rome, Milan, Parma, Modena ...) and international (Paris, New York, Geneva, Staatsoper in Vienna, Berlin, Lyon, Brussels, Lausanne ...) stages where he tackled the great roles in the Verdean repertoire (Falstaff among others, for which he obtained a Grammy Award but also Oberto, conte di San bonifaccio, Verdi's first opera, in 2005), Mozartian (Leporello, Don Alfonso, Figaro ...), bel canto with Rossini (Alidoro, Assur, Mustafa ...); Bellini (I puritani, La sonnambula ...) and Donizetti (Lucia di Lamermoor and Don Pasquale among others). He also sings the role of Méphisto both in Faust (Gounod) and in La Damnation de Faust (Berlioz).

In 2016, he took on the role of Filippo II in Don Carlo in Parma. In 2017, he sang the role of Roger in Jerusalem by Verdi, also in Parma.

== Discography (non exhaustive) ==
=== Opera ===
- 1987: Rigoletto (Verdi, CD)
- 1989: Il barbiere di Siviglia (Rossini, CD)
- 1990: Così fan tutte (Mozart, CD)
- 1991: Don Giovanni (Mozart, CD)
- 1992: La Cenerentola (Rossini, CD)
- 1993: Maometto II (Rossini, CD)
- 1994: Il signor Bruschino (Rossini, CD); Semiramide (Rossini, CD); Don Carlos (Verdi, CD); Le nozze di Figaro (Mozart, CD)
- 1996: Così fan tutte (Mozart, CD); Don Giovanni (Mozart, CD); I puritani (Bellini, CD); Il barbiere di Siviglia (Rossini, CD); La Cenerentola (Rossini, DVD)
- 1998: Il turco in Italia (Rossini, CD)
- 2000: Moïse et Pharaon (Rossini, CD); Nina (Paisiello, CD); Le siège de Corinthe (Rossini, CD); Les contes d’Hoffmann (Offenbach, CD)
- 2001: Oberto (Verdi, CD); Ernani (Verdi, CD); La damnation de Faust (Berlioz, CD)
- 2003: Thaïs (Massenet, CD)
- 2004: I puritani (Bellini, CD); Falstaff (Verdi, CD)
- 2006: Le nozze di Figaro (Mozart, CD)
- 2007: Torvaldo e Dorliska (Rossini, CD/DVD recorded at the Rossini Opera Festival 2006)
- 2008: La gazza ladra (Rossini, DVD, recorded at the Rossini Opera Festival 2007)
- 2010 : La Sonnambula (Bellini, DVD, recorded at the Rossini Opera Festival on March 21, 2009 )
- 2011 : Le comte Ory (Rossini, DVD, recorded at the Rossini Opera Festival in March 2011 )
- 2016: Don Carlo (Verdi, CD and DVD. 4 act version recorded at the Teatro Regio de Parme)

=== Recitals ===
- 1988: Concert gala opera (CD)
- 1993: Masters of the Opera (CD); Di tanti palpiti (CD)
- 1995: Jungen stimmen der oper (CD)
- 1996: Gala opera concert (CD)
- 1997: Airs pour basse (CD); Récital Rossini (CD)
- 1998: Serenata (CD); Malia (CD); Christmas in the world (CD)
- 1999: Arie da camara (CD)
- 2000: The best of Verdi (CD); Verdi opera highlights (CD)
- 2003: Mozart opera highlights (CD)
- 2005: Live recital (CD)

=== Religious music ===
- 1995: Petite messe solennelle (Rossini, CD)
- 1998: Cantates sacrées (Rossini, CD)
- 2003: Stabat Mater (Rossini, CD); Sacred works (Verdi, CD)
