= Queen of the Disco =

Studio album by Sikter
- Released: 1 March 2002
- Recorded: 2001 in Sarajevo
- Genre: Disco, alternative rock, funk
- Length: 40:46
- Label: Bock
- Producer: Enes Zlatar, Oliver Dujmović

Sikter chronology
Now, Always, Never (2000)	Queen of the Disco (2002)	My Music (2005)

Queen of the Disco is the second studio album by Bosnian alternative rock band Sikter. It was released on 1 March 2002 by Bock. The album was exclusively released for Bosnia and Herzegovina, Serbia and Montenegro and Croatia.

It was recorded in 2001 in Sarajevo after the great success of the band's debut album, Now, Always, Never. Producers of album were the front-man of the band, Enes Zlatar, and the chairman of the Bock label, Oliver Dujmović. On this album the prevailing musical style is Disco with elements of soul, funk and reggae.

== Track listing ==
All music is composed by Sikter.

No.	Title	Length
1.	"Shake 'Em"	4:57
2.	"Queen of the Disco"	4:14
3.	"Love is an Alien"	4:12
4.	"Stop"	3:27
5.	"She is Blind"	4:16
6.	"Life is a Moment"	5:12
7.	"Edit (Piaf)"	4:43
8.	"Lova do krova"	2:37
9.	"Bravos amigos"	3:26
10.	"Love You Baby"	9:57
Total length:		40:46

== Personnel ==
- Enes Zlatar Bure, vocals, keyboards, producer
- Esad Bratović - guitars
- Dejan Rokvić - bass
- Igor Čamo - keyboards
- Faris Arapović - drums
- Oliver Dujmović - producer
