= Centro Educativo Pavarotti =

Secondary school for children aged 12 to 16 in San Lucas Tóliman, Guatemala

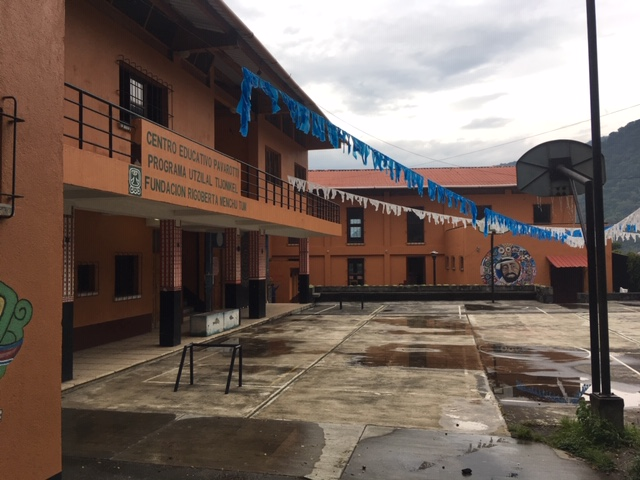
- The Pavarotti Education Center

Location
- near Lake Atitlán in San Lucas Tolimán, Sololá Departement; Guatemala

Information
- Other names: Pavarotti Education Center; CEP
- Type: Private middle school
- Established: 2005; 20 years ago
- Founders: Rigoberta Menchú Foundation; Luciano Pavarotti
- Age range: 12–16
- Website: centropavarotti.org.gt

Centro Educativo Pavarotti (translated as Pavarotti Education Center; abbreviated as CEP) is a junior high school for children aged 12–16 located near Lake Atitlán in San Lucas Tolimán, Sololá Departement, Guatemala. The center is an initiative of the Rigoberta Menchú Foundation (specifically the Utizal Tijonikel Program), which is an institution accredited for its contributions to the defense of human rights especially of indigenous peoples which impels educational programs, citizen participation, community development and combating impunity. The Utzilal Tijonikel program, which translated from Kaqchikel into English means “teaching to do the good thing”, offers also education complemented by a basic work orientation. The center serves approximately 150 Guatemalan children with 10 professors educating them. The majority of children attending this school live in poor circumstances, so that they receive financial support in order to attend this school. Without these benefits they would probably work on fields, like many of their parents do.

== History ==
In 1999 the Italian operatic tenor Luciano Pavarotti hosted a charity concert, which goal it was to collect funds in order to found an institution that would provide education for the indigenous Maya children in Guatemala, mostly victims of the passed civil war in their country.

Due to the friendship between the Nobel Peace Prize recipient and promoter of indigenous rights, Rigoberta Menchú Tum and Luciano Pavarotti they started a collaboration. Rigoberta Menchú Tum came up with the idea of a school and she got commissioned the organisation and construction of the school, which started in 2000. The education institute started in 2003. The Luciano Pavarotti Foundation transferred the building and the administration of the school to the Rigoberta Menchú Tum Foundation, along with an agreement to finance it until 2005. After 2005 the school had to be self-sufficient, which led to the fact that the school is running some other services in the touristic sector (little restaurant, room rental, tours to discover the Mayan culture) to finance their school operations.

== Curriculum ==
Students attend a variety of classes including Spanish, English, mathematics, science, weaving, carpentry, computing, dancing, and art. They are also taught the indigenous Kaqchikel language and Kaqchikel math to preserve the traditional Mayan wisdom. The Utizal Tijonikel Program's purpose is to teach "doing good" " and this also means to teach the acceptance of gender equality and its implementation. The school´s vision includes sustainable education while maintaining respect for diverse cultures but also the respect and appreciation of their own Mayan culture. Their mission is to foster youth leaders who are pro-peace and pro-human rights and against racism.

== Objectives of the Centro Educativo Pavarotti ==
- to give children a high academic level education
- to promote human values and rights and interculturalism
- to contribute to the sustainable devolvement of the rural communities around Volunteer Opportunities

== Volunteer opportunities ==
The Rigoberta Menchú Foundation promotes "Intercultural Solidarity Tourism", a program which gives college students and educational institutions the opportunity to interact with the Mayan people and learn about the indigenous culture. Volunteers have many options to assist the persons in power. They can volunteer in classrooms by helping with lessons, teaching languages, but they can also take action and establish courses with educational purpose like one about environmental issues. Another big part of volunteers would be their engagement in establishing a tourism program, to help the Centro to finance itself and to create better conditions for their students. They will learn about the Mayan calendar, Kaqchikel language, culture, rituals, and the Guatemalan Civil War. The aim is interculturalism and solidarity between people of different cultures. Volunteers can also visit local communities and traditional tourist sites such as Antigua Guatemala and Iximche.

== Gallery ==
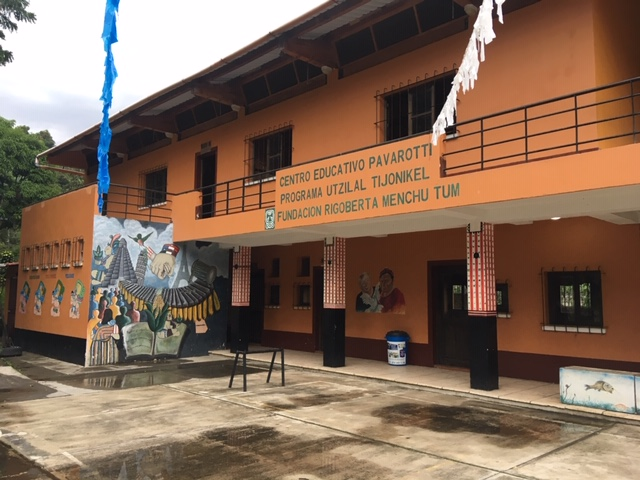
Centro Educativo Pavarotti main building

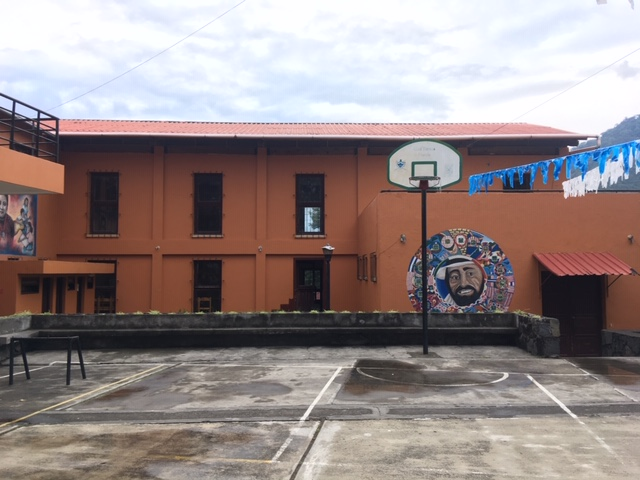
Side building and basketball court

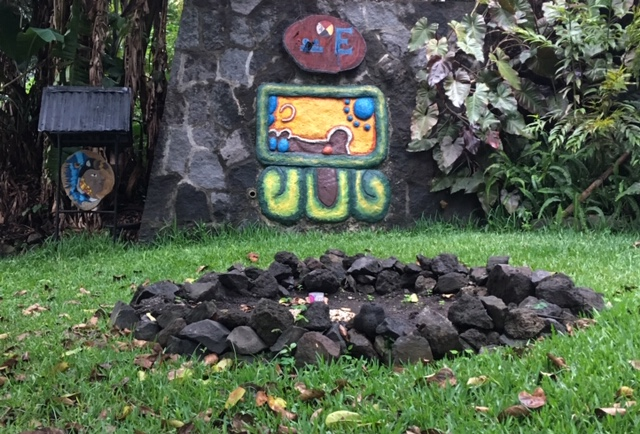
Mayan cult site in the CEP

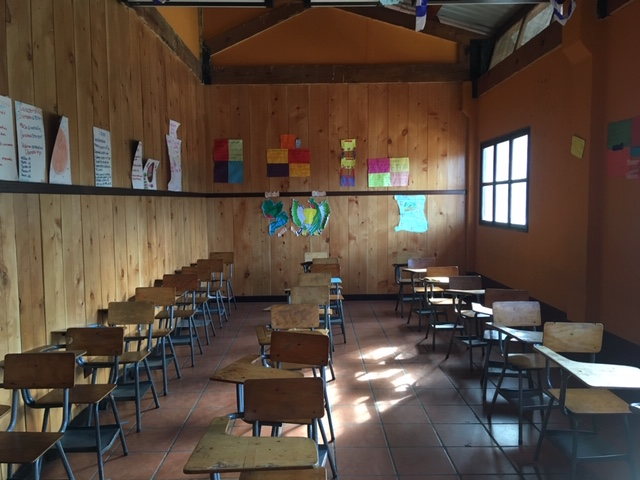
Classroom in the CEP

== See also ==
- Education in Guatemala
