= Luciano Pavarotti =

Italian operatic tenor (1935–2007)

Luciano Pavarotti OMRI
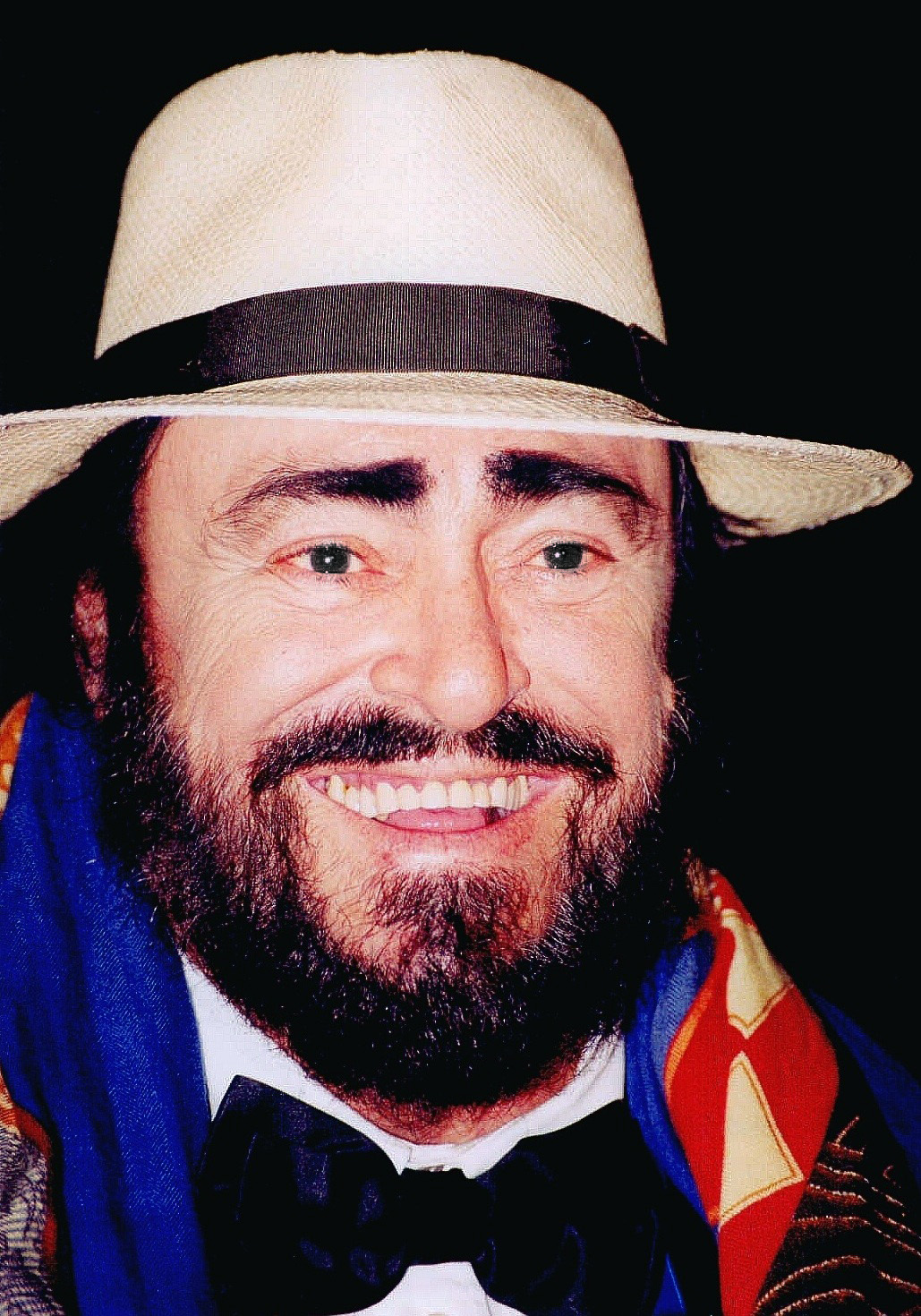
- Pavarotti in 2001
- Born: 12 October 1935; Modena, Emilia-Romagna, Kingdom of Italy
- Died: 6 September 2007 (aged 71); Modena, Emilia-Romagna, Italy
- Occupation: Operatic tenor
- Years active: 1955–2006
- Spouses: Adua Veroni (m. 1961; div. 2002); Nicoletta Mantovani (m. 2003)
- Children: 4
- Pavarotti's voice Pavarotti performing "Una furtiva lagrima" from the Italian opera L'elisir d'amore

Luciano Pavarotti (Note: English: /ˌluːtʃiˈɑːnoʊ ˌpævəˈrɒti/ LOO-chee-AH-noh PAV-ə-ROT-ee, US also /- ˌpɑːv-/ - PAHV-; Italian: [luˈtʃaːno pavaˈrɔtti].) (12 October 1935 – 6 September 2007) was an Italian operatic tenor who during the late part of his career crossed over into popular music, eventually becoming one of the most acclaimed tenors of all time. He made numerous recordings of complete operas and individual arias, gaining worldwide fame for his tone and the nickname "King of the High Cs".

As one of the Three Tenors, who performed their first concert during the 1990 FIFA World Cup before a global audience, Pavarotti became well known for his televised concerts and media appearances. From the beginning of his professional career as a tenor in 1961 in Italy to his final performance of "Nessun dorma" at the 2006 Winter Olympics in Turin, Pavarotti was at his best in bel canto operas, pre-Aida Verdi roles, and Puccini works such as La bohème, Tosca, Turandot and Madama Butterfly. He sold more than 100 million records, and the first Three Tenors recording became the best-selling classical album of all time. Pavarotti was also noted for his charity work on behalf of refugees and the Red Cross, amongst others. He was appointed a Knight Grand Cross of the Order of Merit of the Italian Republic in 1988. Pavarotti died from pancreatic cancer on 6 September 2007.

== Biography ==
=== Early life and musical training ===
Luciano Pavarotti was born on 12 October 1935 in a public housing block on the outskirts of Modena in Northern Italy, the son of Fernando Pavarotti, a baker and amateur tenor, and Adele Venturi, a cigar factory worker. Although he spoke fondly of his childhood, the family had little money; its four members were crowded into a two-room apartment. According to Pavarotti, his father had a fine tenor voice but rejected the possibility of a singing career because of nervousness. World War II forced the family out of the city in 1943. For the following year, they rented a single room from a farmer in the neighbouring countryside, where the young Pavarotti developed an interest in farming.

After abandoning the dream of becoming a football goalkeeper, Pavarotti spent seven years in vocal training. Pavarotti's earliest musical influences were his father's records, most of them featuring the popular tenors of the day—Beniamino Gigli, Giovanni Martinelli, Tito Schipa, and Enrico Caruso. Pavarotti's favourite tenor and idol was Giuseppe Di Stefano. He was also deeply influenced by Mario Lanza, saying: "In my teens I used to go to Mario Lanza movies and then come home and imitate him in the mirror". At around the age of nine, he began singing with his father in a small local church choir.

In addition to music, as a child, Pavarotti enjoyed playing football. When he graduated from the Scuola Magistrale, he was interested in pursuing a career as a professional football goalkeeper, but his mother convinced him to train as a teacher. He subsequently taught in an elementary school for two years but finally decided to pursue a music career. His father, recognising the risk involved, only reluctantly gave his consent. Pavarotti began the serious study of music in 1954 at the age of 19 with Arrigo Pola, a respected teacher and professional tenor in Modena who offered to teach him without remuneration. According to conductor Richard Bonynge, Pavarotti never learned to read music.

In 1955, he experienced his first singing success when he was a member of the Corale Rossini, a male voice choir from Modena that also included his father, which won first prize at the International Eisteddfod in Llangollen, Wales. He later said that this was the most important experience of his life, and that it inspired him to become a professional singer.

When his teacher, Arrigo Pola, moved to Japan, Pavarotti became a student of Ettore Campogalliani, who at that time was also teaching Pavarotti's childhood friend, Mirella Freni, whose mother worked with Luciano's mother in the cigar factory. Like Pavarotti, Freni went on to become a successful opera singer; they collaborated in various stage performances and recordings together.

During his years of musical study, Pavarotti held part-time jobs to sustain himself—first as an elementary school teacher and then as an insurance salesman. The first six years of study resulted in only a few recitals, all in small towns and without pay. When a nodule developed on his vocal cords, causing a "disastrous" concert in Ferrara, he decided to give up singing. Pavarotti attributed his immediate improvement to the psychological release connected with this decision. Whatever the reason, the nodule not only disappeared but, as he related in his autobiography: "Everything I had learned came together with my natural voice to make the sound I had been struggling so hard to achieve".

=== Career: 1960s–1970s ===
Pavarotti began his career as a tenor in smaller regional Italian opera houses. After winning the Achille Peri International Competition, he made his debut as Rodolfo in La bohème at the Teatro Municipale in Reggio Emilia in April 1961, conducted by Francesco Molinari-Pradelli and staged by Mafalda Favero. His first known recording of "Che gelida manina" was recorded during this performance.

In December 1961, Pavarotti made his first international appearance in La traviata in Belgrade, Yugoslavia. On 23 February 1963, he debuted at the Vienna State Opera in the same role. In March and April 1963, Pavarotti performed again in Vienna as Rodolfo and as Duca di Mantova in Rigoletto. The same year, he performed his first solo non-opera concert outside Italy when he sang in Dundalk, Ireland, for the St Cecilia's Gramophone Society. He was engaged by the Dublin Grand Opera Society to sing The Duke of Mantua in Verdi's Rigoletto in May and June, and his Royal Opera House debut, where he replaced an indisposed Giuseppe Di Stefano as Rodolfo. In September 1963, he made his debut at Covent Garden in La bohème, which gave his career a boost.

In 1964, Pavarotti appeared as Idamante in Idomeneo at Glyndebourne and was engaged by the Dublin Grand Opera Society to sing Rodolfo in Giacomo Puccini's La bohème and Alfredo in Giuseppe Verdi's La traviata. Reviewers favourably comment on his singing.

Pavarotti sang with Joan Sutherland when he made his American début with the Greater Miami Opera in February 1965, singing in Gaetano Donizetti's Lucia di Lammermoor on the stage of the Miami-Dade County Auditorium in Miami. The tenor that was scheduled to perform that night became ill with no understudy. Sutherland recommended Pavarotti as he was acquainted with the role. On 28 April, Pavarotti made his La Scala debut in the revival of the Franco Zeffirelli production of La bohème, with his childhood friend Mirella Freni singing Mimi and Herbert von Karajan conducting. Karajan had requested the singer's engagement.

Joan Sutherland and her conductor husband, Richard Bonynge sought a tall tenor to take along on their 1965 tour to Australia. During the Australia tour in summer 1965, Sutherland and Pavarotti sang forty performances over two months. Pavarotti later credited Sutherland for the breathing and diaphragm technique that sustained him through his career.

After the extended Australian tour, he returned to La Scala, where he added Tebaldo from I Capuleti e i Montecchi to his repertoire on 26 March 1966, with Giacomo Aragall as Romeo.

His first appearance as Tonio in Donizetti's La fille du régiment took place at the Royal Opera House, Covent Garden, on 2 June 1966. In this performance, he was the first tenor to deliver nine natural high Cs in the aria "Ah! mes amis".

He scored another major triumph in Rome on 20 November 1969 when he sang in I Lombardi opposite Renata Scotto. This was recorded on a private label and widely distributed, as were various recordings of his I Capuleti e i Montecchi, usually with Aragall. Early commercial recordings included a recital of Donizetti (the aria from Don Sebastiano were particularly highly regarded) and Verdi arias, as well as a complete L'elisir d'amore with Sutherland.

His breakthrough in the United States came on 17 February 1972, in a production of La fille du régiment at New York's Metropolitan Opera, in which he hit nine high Cs in the signature aria and had seventeen curtain calls. This earned him the nickname "King of the High Cs".

Pavarotti sang his international recital début at William Jewell College in Liberty, Missouri, on 1 February 1973, as part of the college's Fine Arts Program, now known as the Harriman–Jewell Series. According to his manager at the time, Pavarotti clutched a handkerchief throughout this recital because he had a lingering cold. Pavarotti himself explained that he needed the handkerchief, since he didn't know what to do with his hands. The prop became a signature part of his solo performances. He began to give frequent television performances, starting with his performances as Rodolfo (La bohème) in the first Live from the Met telecast in March 1977, which attracted one of the largest audiences ever for a televised opera. He won Grammy awards and platinum and gold discs for his performances.

In 1976, Pavarotti debuted at the Salzburg Festival, appearing in a solo recital on 31 July, accompanied by pianist Leone Magiera. Pavarotti returned to the festival in 1978 with a recital and as the Italian singer in Der Rosenkavalier in 1983 with Idomeneo, and both in 1985 and 1988 with solo recitals. In 1979, he was profiled in a cover story in the weekly magazine Time. That same year saw Pavarotti's return to the Vienna State Opera after an absence of fourteen years. With Herbert von Karajan conducting, Pavarotti sang Manrico in Il trovatore. In 1978, he appeared in a solo recital on Live from Lincoln Center.

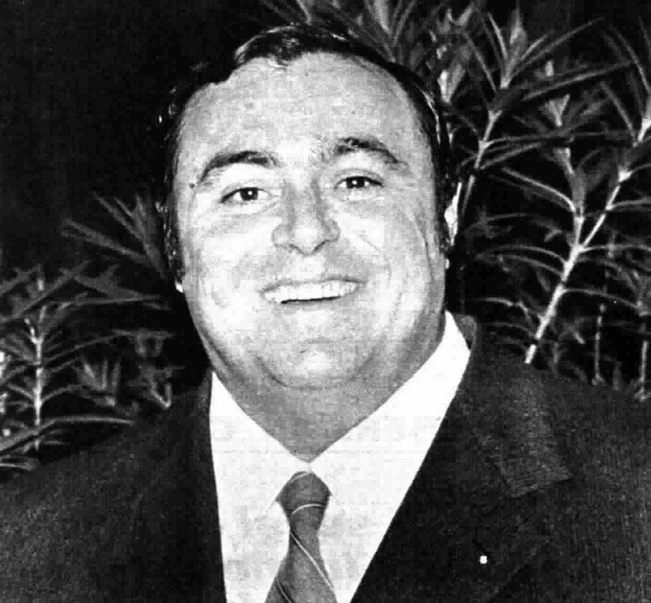
Luciano Pavarotti in 1972

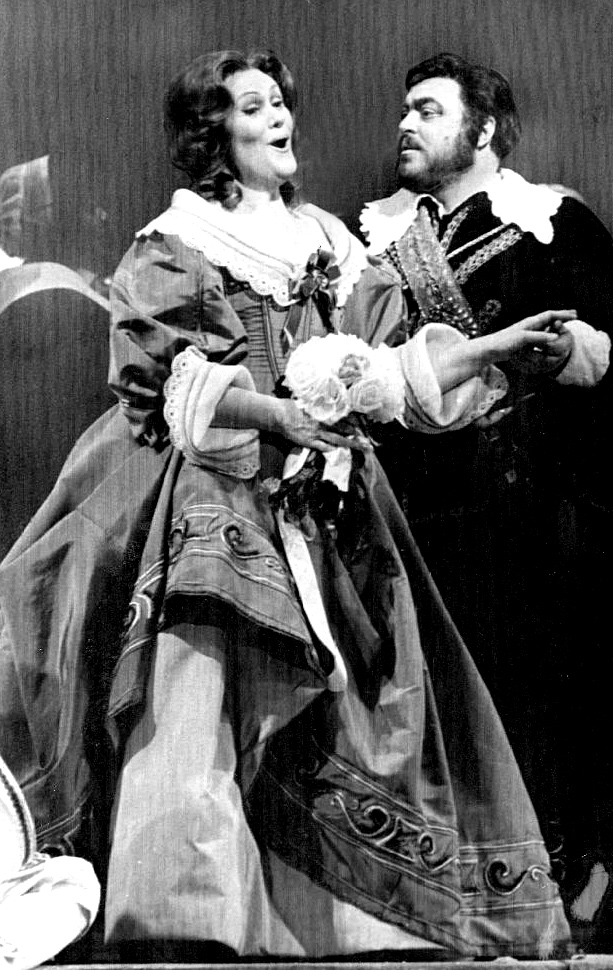
With Joan Sutherland in I puritani (1976)

=== Career: 1980s–1990s ===
At the beginning of the 1980s, he set up The Pavarotti International Voice Competition for young singers, performing with the winners in 1982 in excerpts of La bohème and L'elisir d'amore. The second competition, in 1986, staged excerpts of La bohème and Un ballo in maschera. To celebrate the 25th anniversary of his career, he brought the winners of the competition to Italy for gala performances of La bohème in Modena and Genoa, and then to China, where they staged performances of La bohème in Beijing (Peking). To conclude the visit, Pavarotti performed the inaugural concert in the Great Hall of the People before 10,000 people, receiving a standing ovation for nine high Cs. The third competition in 1989 again staged performances of L'elisir d'amore and Un ballo in maschera. The winners of the fifth competition accompanied Pavarotti in performances in Philadelphia in 1997.

In the mid-1980s, Pavarotti returned to two opera houses that had provided him with important breakthroughs, the Vienna State Opera and La Scala. Vienna saw Pavarotti as Rodolfo in La bohème with Carlos Kleiber conducting, and again Mirella Freni was Mimi; as Nemorino in L'elisir d'amore; as Radames in Aida conducted by Lorin Maazel; as Rodolfo in Luisa Miller; and as Gustavo in Un ballo in maschera conducted by Claudio Abbado. In 1996, Pavarotti appeared for the last time at the Staatsoper in Andrea Chénier. Throughout the 1980s and 90s, promoters Tibor Rudas and Harvey Goldsmith booked Pavarotti into increasingly larger venues.

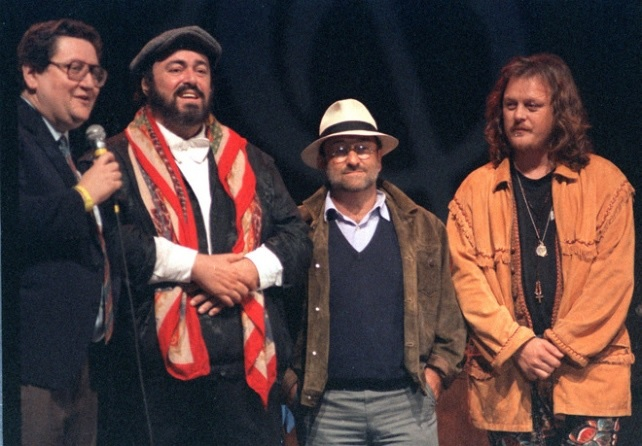
From left: journalist Vincenzo Mollica, Pavarotti, Lucio Dalla and Zucchero on the first edition of Pavarotti & Friends (1992)

In 1985, Pavarotti sang Radames at La Scala opposite Maria Chiara in a Luca Ronconi production conducted by Maazel, recorded on video. His performance of the aria "Celeste Aida" received a two-minute ovation on the opening night. He was reunited with Mirella Freni for the San Francisco Opera production of La bohème in 1988, also recorded on video. In 1992, La Scala saw Pavarotti in a new Zeffirelli production of Don Carlos, conducted by Riccardo Muti.

Pavarotti became even better known throughout the world in 1990 when his rendition of the aria "Nessun dorma" from Giacomo Puccini's Turandot was taken as the theme song of BBC's coverage of the 1990 FIFA World Cup in Italy. The aria achieved pop status, became the World Cup soundtrack, and remained his trademark song. This was followed by the first Three Tenors concert, held on the eve of the 1990 FIFA World Cup Final at the ancient Baths of Caracalla in Rome with fellow tenors Plácido Domingo and José Carreras and conductor Zubin Mehta. The performance for the World Cup closing concert captivated a global audience, and it became the biggest-selling classical record of all time. A highlight of the concert, in which Pavarotti sang the opening verses using extended vocal runs for di Capua's "'O sole mio" and which was in turn perfectly repeated note-for-note by Domingo and Carreras. The recorded album sold millions of copies, and the first Three Tenors recording became the best-selling classical album of all time. Throughout the 1990s, Pavarotti appeared in outdoor concerts, including his televised concert in London's Hyde Park, which drew a record attendance of 150,000. In June 1993, more than 500,000 listeners gathered for his free performance on the Great Lawn of New York's Central Park, while millions more around the world watched on television. The following September, in the shadow of the Eiffel Tower in Paris, he sang for an estimated crowd of 300,000. Following on from the original 1990 concert, the Three Tenors concerts were held during the three subsequent FIFA World Cup Finals, in 1994 in Los Angeles, 1998 in Paris, and 2002 in Yokohama.

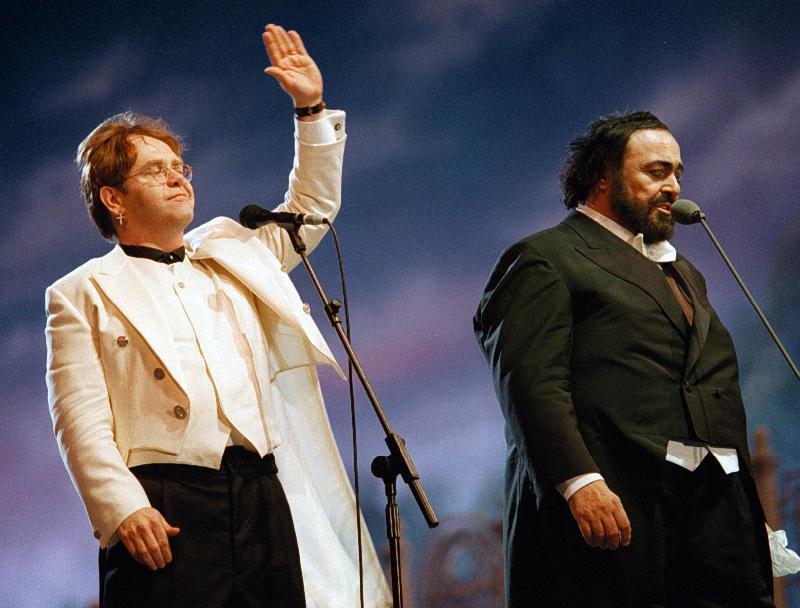
Elton John and Pavarotti in Modena, 1996

In September 1995, Pavarotti performed Schubert's Ave Maria along with Dolores O'Riordan; Diana, Princess of Wales, who attended the live performance, told O'Riordan that the song brought her to tears.

In 1995, Pavarotti's friends, Lara Saint Paul (as Lara Cariaggi) and her husband showman Pier Quinto Cariaggi, who had produced and organised Pavarotti's 1990 FIFA World Cup Celebration Concert at the PalaTrussardi in Milan, produced and wrote the television documentary The Best is Yet to Come, an extensive biography about the life of Pavarotti. Lara Saint Paul was the interviewer for the documentary with Pavarotti, who spoke candidly about his life and career.

Pavarotti earned a reputation as "The King of Cancellations" by frequently backing out of performances, and his unreliable nature led to poor relationships with some opera houses. This was brought into focus in 1989 when Ardis Krainik of the Lyric Opera of Chicago severed the house's 15-year relationship with the tenor. Over an eight-year period, Pavarotti had cancelled 26 out of 41 scheduled appearances at the Lyric, and the decisive move by Krainik to ban him for life was well noted throughout the opera world, after the performer walked away from a season premiere less than two weeks before rehearsals began, saying pain from a sciatic nerve required two months of treatment. On 12 December 1998, he became the first (and, to date, only) opera singer to perform on Saturday Night Live, singing alongside Vanessa L. Williams. He also sang with U2 in the band's 1995 song "Miss Sarajevo" and with Mercedes Sosa in a big concert at the Boca Juniors arena La Bombonera in Buenos Aires, Argentina, in 1999. In 1998, Pavarotti was presented with the Grammy Legend Award.

=== Career: Early 2000s ===
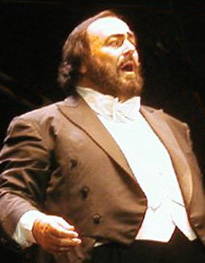
Luciano Pavarotti performing on 15 June 2002 at a concert in the Stade Vélodrome in Marseille

In September 2003, he released his final compilation—and his first and only "crossover" album, Ti Adoro. Most of the 13 songs were written and produced by Michele Centonze, who had already helped produce the "Pavarotti & Friends" concerts between 1998 and 2000. The tenor described the album as a wedding gift to Nicoletta Mantovani.

In 2004, one of Pavarotti's former managers, Herbert Breslin, published a book, The King & I. Seen by critics as bitter and sensationalistic, it is critical of the singer's acting (in opera), his inability to read music well and learn parts, and his personal conduct, although acknowledging their success together. In an interview in 2005 with Jeremy Paxman on the BBC, Pavarotti rejected the allegation that he could not read music, although he acknowledged he did not read orchestral scores.

His awards and honours include Kennedy Center Honors in 2001. He also holds two Guinness World Records: one for receiving the most curtain calls (165) and another for the best-selling classical album (Carreras Domingo Pavarotti in Concert by the Three Tenors; the latter record is thus shared by fellow tenors Plácido Domingo and José Carreras).

=== Final performances ===
On 13 March 2004, Pavarotti gave his last performance in an opera at the New York Metropolitan Opera, for which he received a long standing ovation for his role as the painter Mario Cavaradossi in Giacomo Puccini's Tosca.

On 1 December 2004, he announced a 40-city farewell tour, produced by Harvey Goldsmith. His last full-scale performance was in Taiwan in December 2005.

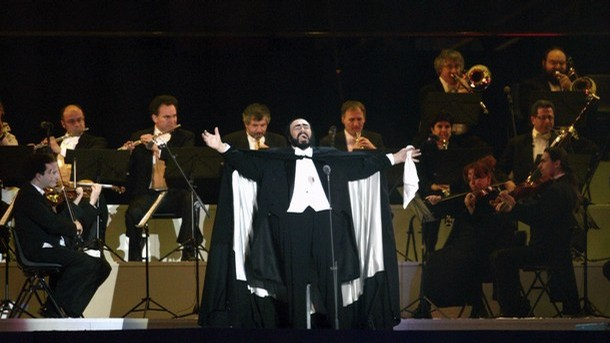
Pavarotti performing a lip-synced version of "Nessun dorma" at the 2006 Winter Olympics opening ceremony

On 10 February 2006, Pavarotti performed "Nessun dorma" as the last act of the 2006 Winter Olympics opening ceremony in Turin, Italy, his final performance. However, as he was unsure of the strength of his voice due to health issues, he prerecorded the song and lip synced the performance, with approval from the International Olympic Committee. His performance received the longest and loudest ovation of the night.

== Personal life ==
=== Relationships ===
In the 1950s, Pavarotti met Adua Veroni. They married in 1961 and had three daughters: Lorenza, Cristina, and Giuliana. They separated in the early 1990s and divorced in 2002.

On 13 December 2003, he married his second wife and former personal assistant, Nicoletta Mantovani (born 1969, 34 years younger than Pavarotti), with whom he already had another daughter, Alice (born in January 2003), when Pavarotti was 67. Her twin brother, Riccardo, was stillborn.

=== Tax evasion charges ===
Pavarotti long claimed Monte Carlo in the tax haven of Monaco as his tax residence, but, in 1999, an Italian court rejected that claim by ruling that his Monaco address could not accommodate his entire family and accused him of tax evasion. In 2000, Pavarotti agreed to pay the Italian government 24 million Italian lire, and in 2001, he was acquitted in an Italian court of tax evasion charges.

=== Health issues and death ===
Pavarotti had long struggled with his weight and was 350 pounds (160 kg) at his heaviest. In 1998, he had double hip replacement surgery and knee surgery.

In March 2005, Pavarotti underwent neck surgery to repair two vertebrae. In early 2006, he underwent back surgery and contracted an infection while in the hospital in New York, forcing cancellation of concerts in the US, Canada, and the UK.

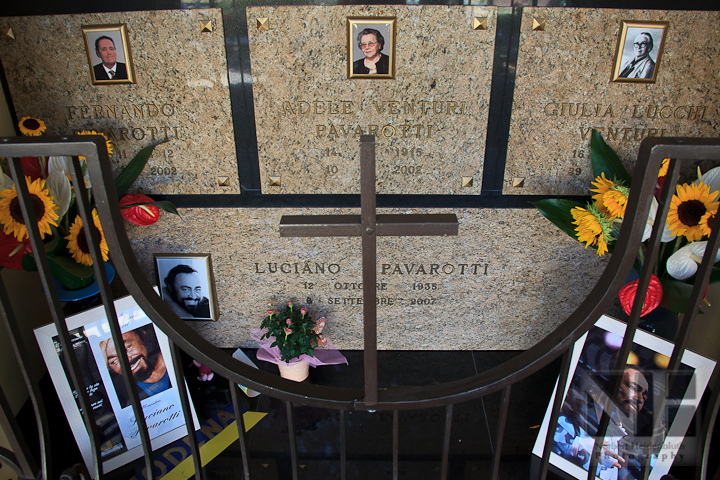
Grave of Luciano Pavarotti and his family in Montale Rangone

In July 2006, after suffering from abdominal discomfort and weight loss, Pavarotti was diagnosed with pancreatic cancer, which has a very low survival rate. He cancelled the remainder of his concerts and underwent successful surgery at Memorial Sloan Kettering Cancer Center to remove the tumour. However, the cancer had already undergone metastasis. Pavarotti died at his home in Modena on 6 September 2007. His manager noted that "he remained positive until finally succumbing to the last stages of his illness".

Pavarotti's funeral was held at Modena Cathedral. Prime Minister Romano Prodi and Kofi Annan attended. The Frecce Tricolori, the aerobatic demonstration team of the Italian Air Force, flew overhead, leaving green-white-red smoke trails. After a funeral procession through the centre of Modena, Pavarotti's coffin was taken the final ten kilometres (6 miles) to Montale Rangone, a village part of Castelnuovo Rangone, and was interred in the Pavarotti family crypt. The funeral, in its entirety, was also telecast live on CNN. The Vienna State Opera and the Salzburg Festival hall flew black flags in mourning. Tributes were published by many opera houses, such as London's Royal Opera House.

At the time of his death in September 2007, he was survived by his wife, his four daughters, and one granddaughter.

==== Estate ====
Pavarotti's estate was valued at as much as €300 million before deducting debts and mortgages of €18 million. It included a villa in Pesaro, a home in Modena (now a museum), a high-profile co-op apartment in New York City, an apartment in Monte Carlo, international royalties, stage costumes, and art collections.

Pavarotti had three wills: one, under Italian law, for his Italian assets, one, under US law, for his US assets, and a third handwritten will that reduced his wife's share.

His Italian will gave half of his estate to his second wife, Nicoletta Mantovani, and half to his four daughters, split equally amongst them; the second will gave all his U.S. holdings to Mantovani. Pavarotti's daughters felt shortchanged and contested the will, and a Pesaro public prosecutor, Massimo di Patria, investigated allegations that Pavarotti was not of sound mind when he signed the will. As part of a compromise confirmed by a judge in July 2008, the daughters were given the house in Pesaro.

== Other work ==
=== Film and television ===
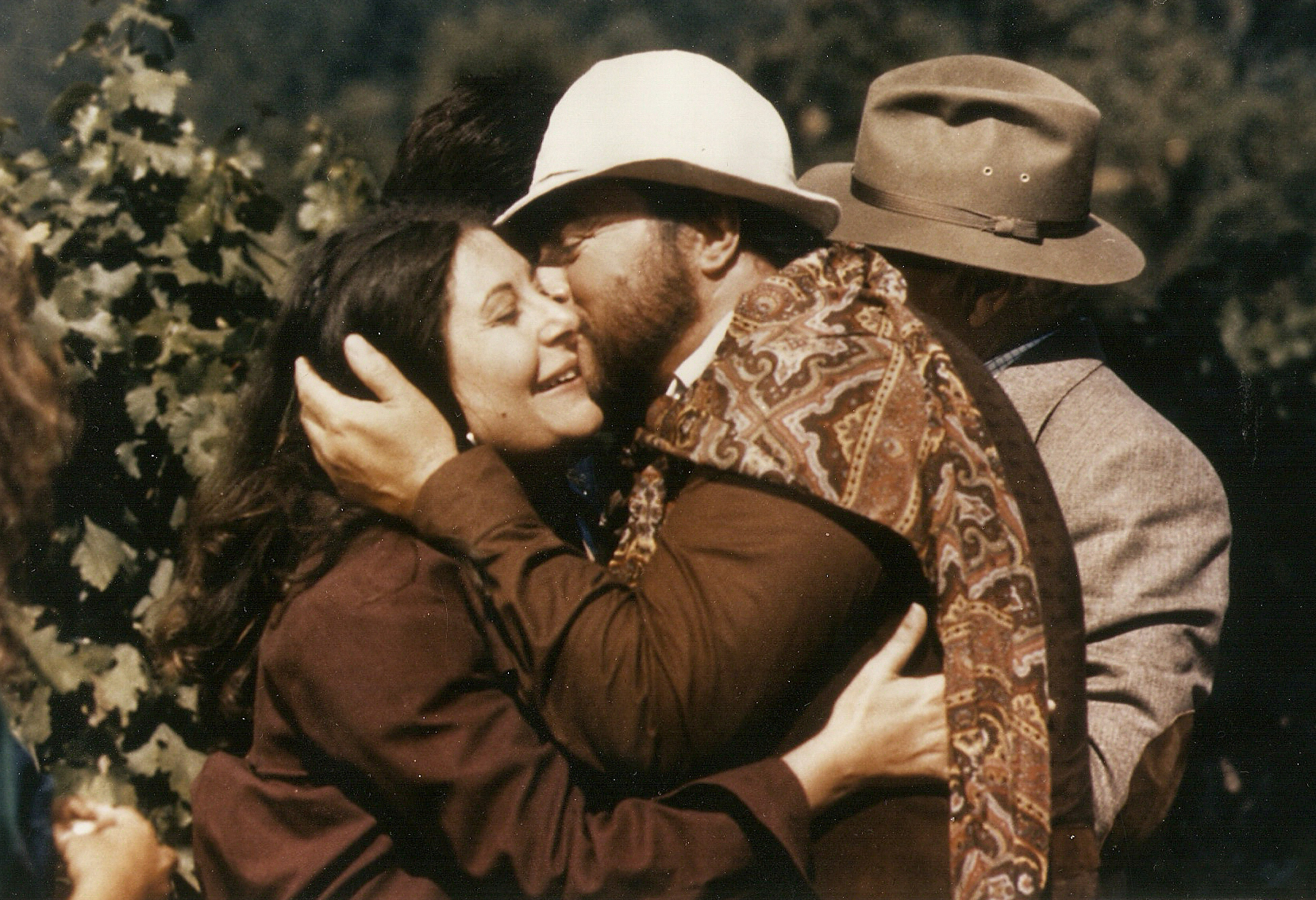
Pavarotti embraces Karen Kondazian on the set of Yes, Giorgio.

Pavarotti's one venture into film was Yes, Giorgio (1982), a romantic comedy movie directed by Franklin J. Schaffner, in which he starred as the main character Giorgio Fini. The film was a critical and commercial failure, although it received an Academy Award nomination for Best Music, Original Song.

He can be seen to better advantage in Jean-Pierre Ponnelle's movie Rigoletto, an adaptation of the opera of the same name also released in 1982, or in his more than 20 live opera performances taped for television between 1978 and 1994, most of them with the Metropolitan Opera, and most available on DVD.

He received two Primetime Emmy Awards for his PBS variety specials Pavarotti in Philadelphia: La bohème and Duke of Mantua, Rigoletto Great Performances.

Pavarotti, a 2019 documentary film about him, was directed by Ron Howard and produced with the cooperation of Pavarotti's estate using family archives, interviews and live music footage.

=== Humanitarianism ===
Pavarotti annually hosted the Pavarotti & Friends charity concerts in his home town of Modena Italy, joining with singers from all parts of the music industry, including B.B. King, Andrea Bocelli, Zucchero, Jon Bon Jovi, Bryan Adams, Bono, James Brown, Mariah Carey, Eric Clapton, Dolores O'Riordan, Sheryl Crow, Céline Dion, Anastacia, Elton John, Deep Purple, Meat Loaf, Queen, George Michael, Tracy Chapman, the Spice Girls, Sting and Barry White to raise money for several UN causes. Concerts were held for War Child, and victims of war and civil unrest in Bosnia, Guatemala, Kosovo and Iraq. After the war in Bosnia, he financed and established the Pavarotti Music Centre in the southern city of Mostar to offer Bosnia's artists the opportunity to develop their skills. For these contributions, the city of Sarajevo named him an honorary citizen in February 2006.

In May 1990, he performed at a benefit concert at the Bolshoi Theater in Moscow to raise funds for rebuilding after the 1988 Armenian earthquake. At the performance, he sang Gounod's Ave Maria with legendary French pop music star Charles Aznavour.

Pavarotti was a close friend of Diana, Princess of Wales. They raised money for the elimination of land mines worldwide.

In 1998, he was appointed the United Nations Messenger of Peace, using his fame to raise awareness of UN issues, including the Millennium Development Goals, HIV/AIDS, child rights, urban slums and poverty.

In June 1999, Pavarotti performed a charity benefit concert at Camille Chamoun Sports City Stadium in Beirut. The largest concert held in Beirut since the end of the Lebanese Civil War, it was attended by 20,000 people from all over the Persian Gulf.

In 1999, he also hosted a charity benefit concert to build a school in Guatemala, for Guatemalan civil war orphans. It was named after him Centro Educativo Pavarotti. Now the foundation of Nobel Prize winner Rigoberta Menchú Tum is running the school.

==== Humanitarian honours ====
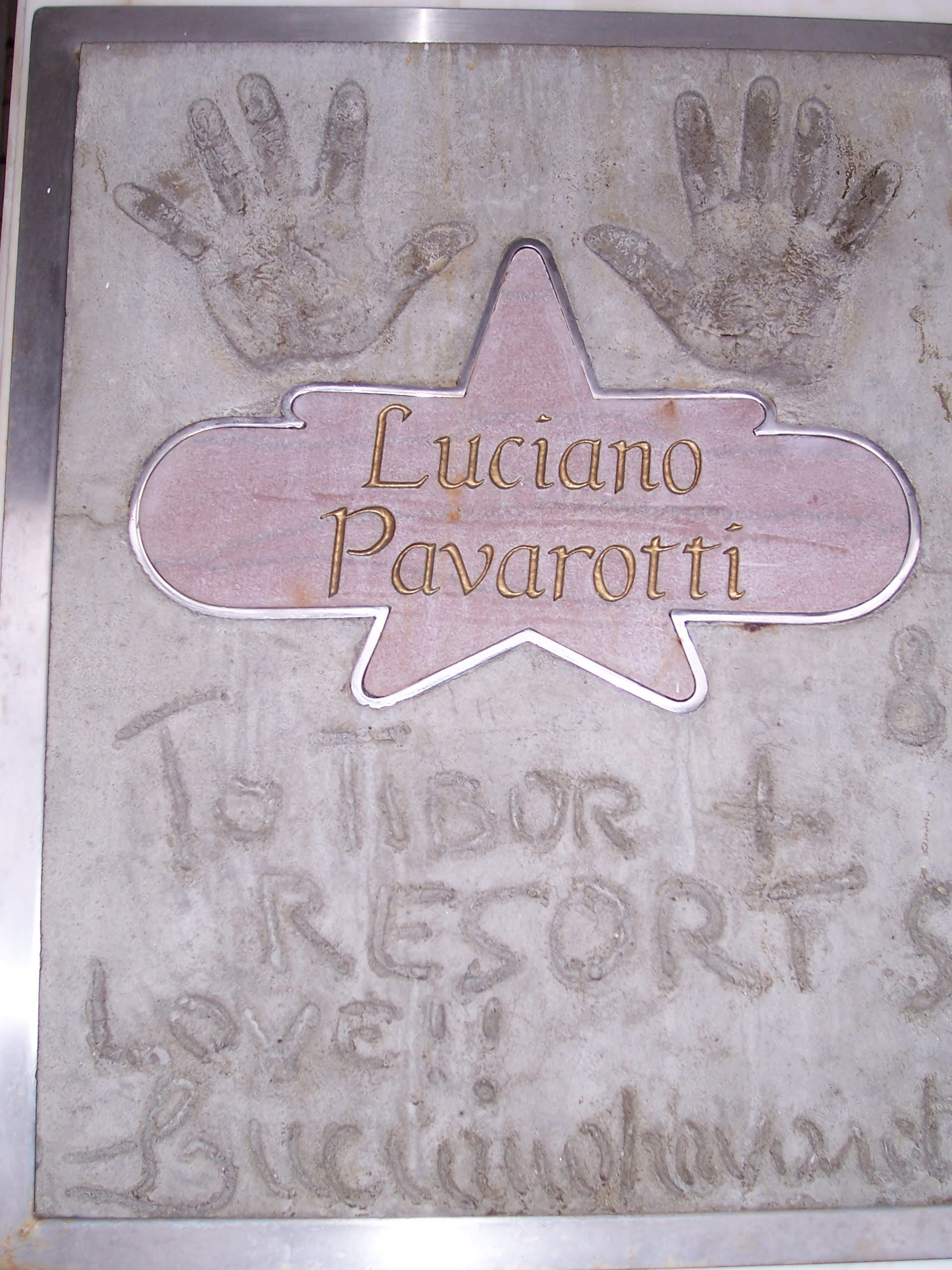
Handprint of Luciano Pavarotti. Atlantic City Boardwalk, New Jersey USA 2006.

In 2001, Pavarotti received the Nansen Medal from the UN High Commission for Refugees for his efforts in raising money on behalf of refugees worldwide. Through benefit concerts and volunteer work, he has raised more than any other individual.

Also in 2001, Pavarotti was chosen one of that year's five recipients by the President and First Lady as an honoree for their lifetime achievements in the arts at the White House, followed by the Kennedy Center; the Kennedy Center Honors, He was surprised by the appearance of Secretary-General of the United Nations and that year's winner of the Nobel Peace Prize, Kofi Annan, who lauded him for his contribution to humankind. Six months prior, Pavarotti had held a large charity concert for Afghan refugees, particularly children in his home town of Modena, Italy.

Other honours he received include the Freedom of London Award and The Red Cross Award for Services to Humanity, for his work in raising money for that organisation, and the 1998 MusiCares Person of the Year, given to humanitarian heroes by the National Academy of Recording Arts and Sciences.

== Selected discography ==
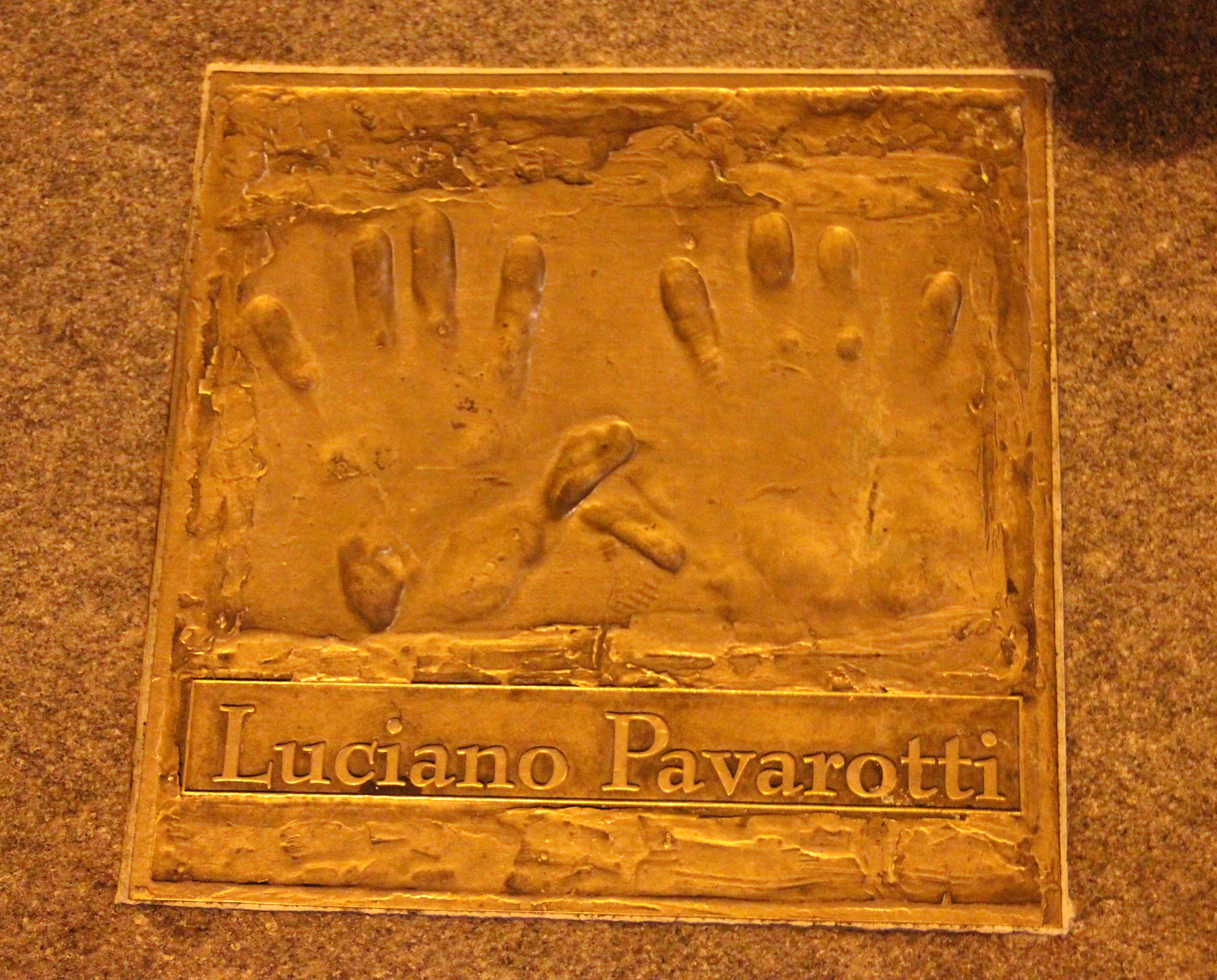
Handprint of Luciano Pavarotti in front of the Gaiety Theatre, Dublin

In addition to his very large discography of opera performances, Pavarotti also made many classical crossover and pop recordings, the Pavarotti & Friends series of concerts and, for Decca, a series of studio recital albums: first six albums of opera arias and then, from 1979, six albums of Italian song.

=== Studio recital albums ===
- Favourite Italian Arias – Arias from La bohème, Tosca and Rigoletto. Orchestra of the Royal Opera House, Covent Garden Edward Downes Decca Records 1966
- Arias by Verdi & Donizetti – Arias from Luisa Miller, I due Foscari, Un ballo in maschera, Macbeth, Lucia di Lammermoor, Il duca d'Alba, La favorita and Don Sebastiano (with the Wiener Opernorchester under Edward Downes, 1968).
- Tenor Arias from Italian Opera – Arias from Guglielmo Tell, I puritani, Il trovatore, L'arlesiana, La bohème, Mefistofele, Don Pasquale, La Gioconda and Giuseppe Pietri's Maristella. Luciano Pavarotti, tenor with Arleen Auger, soprano. Leone Magiera (piano) Wiener Opernorchester and choir. Ambrosian Singers New Philharmonia Orchestra Nicola Rescigno 1971
- The World's Favourite Tenor Arias' – Tosca, Carmen, Aida, Faust, Pagliacci, Martha. Royal Philharmonic Orchestra. Wiener Volksoper Orchester. Leone Magiera. New Philharmonia Orchestra Richard Bonynge 1973
- Pavarotti in Concert – Arias and songs by Giovanni Bononcini, Handel, Alessandro Scarlatti, Bellini, Tosti, Respighi, Rossini. Orchestra del Teatro Comunale di Bologna. Richard Bonynge. 1973
- O Holy Night – Songs and carols by Adam, Stradella, César Franck, Saverio Mercadante, Schubert, Bach (arranged Gounod), Bizet, Berlioz, Pietro Yon, Alois Melichar. Wandsworth School Boys' Choir. London Voices. National Philharmonic Orchestra, Kurt Herbert Adler 1976
- O Sole Mio – Favourite Neapolitan Songs 13 songs by Eduardo di Capua: "O sole mio", Paolo Tosti: "'A vucchella", Enrico Cannio: "O surdato 'nnammurato", Salvatore Gambardella: "O marenariello", Traditional: "Fenesta vascia", Tosti: "A Marechiare", Ernesto De Curtis: "Torna a Surriento", Gaetano Errico Pennino: "Pecchè?", Vincenzo d'Annibale: "'O paese d' 'o sole", Ernesto Tagliaferri: "Piscatore 'e Pusilleco", Curtis: "Tu ca nun chiagne", Capua: "Maria, Mari", Luigi Denza: "Funiculì, Funiculà". Orchestra del Teatro Comunale di Bologna, Anton Guadagno, National Philharmonic Orchestra Giancarlo Chiaramello 1979
- Verismo – Arias from Fedora, Mefistofele, Adriana Lecouvreur, Iris, L'Africaine, Werther, La fanciulla del West, Manon Lescaut, Andrea Chénier. National Philharmonic Orchestra, Oliviero De Fabritiis (Riccardo Chailly for Andrea Chénier arias) 1979
- Mattinata – 14 songs by Caldara, formerly attrib. Pergolesi, probably by Vincenzo Ciampi: Tre giorni son che Nina, Bellini, Tommaso Giordani, Rossini, Gluck, Tosti, Donizetti, Leoncavallo, Beethoven and Francesco Durante. Philharmonia Orchestra Piero Gamba National Philharmonic Orchestra. Antonio Tonini (conductor) 1983
- Mamma – songs by Cesare Andrea Bixio, Ernesto De Curtis, Arturo Buzzi-Peccia, Stanislao Gastaldon, Cesare Cesarini, A. Walter Kramer, Carlo Innocenzi, Giovanni D'Anzi, Eldo Di Lazzaro, Vincenzo De Crescenzo, Domenico Martuzzi, Aniello Califano, Colombino Arona. Arranged and conducted by Henry Mancini, 1984.
- Passione – 12 songs by Ernesto Tagliaferri, Paolo Tosti, Mario Pasquale Costa, Teodoro Cottrau, Evemero Nardella, Rodolfo Falvo, De Curtis, Di Capua, E. A. Mario, Gaetano Lama and Salvatore Cardillo. Orchestra del Teatro Comunale di Bologna. Giancarlo Chiaramello 1985
- Volare – 16 songs by Domenico Modugno, Luigi Denza, Cesare Andrea Bixio, Gabriele Sibella, Giovanni D'Anzi, Michael John Bonagura, Edoardo Mascheroni, Ernesto De Curtis, Ermenegildo Ruccione, Pietro Mascagni, Guido Maria Ferilli. arranged and conducted by Henry Mancini 1987
- Ti Adoro – songs by Romano Musumarra, Carlo Mioli, Ornella D'Urbano, Michele Centonze, Andrea Bellantani, Daniel Vuletic, Veris Giannetti, Nino Rota/Elsa Morante, Edoardo Bennato, Hans Zimmer/Gavin Greenaway/Jeffrey Pescetto, Lucio Dalla. Royal Philharmonic Orchestra Orchestra di Roma. Bulgarian Symphony Orchestra. Romano Musumarra Giancarlo Chiaramello, 2000

== Selected videography ==
- Mozart: Idomeneo (1982), Deutsche Grammophon DVD, 00440-073-4234, 2006
- The Metropolitan Opera Centennial Gala (1983), Deutsche Grammophon DVD, 00440-073-4538, 2009
- The Metropolitan Opera Gala 1991, Deutsche Grammophon DVD, 00440-073-4582, 2010

== Awards and honors ==
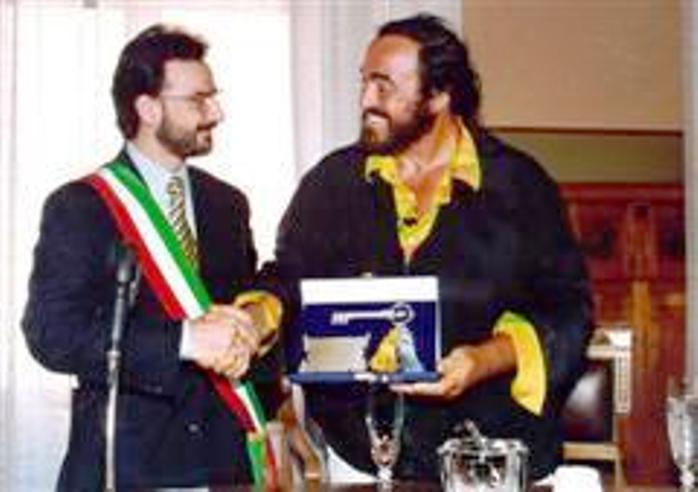
Luciano Pavarotti receiving Keys to the City of Portomaggiore, Italy

=== Civil awards ===
- 1976 – 3rd Class / Commander of the Order of Merit of the Italian Republic
- 1980 – 2nd Class / Grand Officer of the Order of Merit of the Italian Republic
- 1988 – 1st Class / Knight Grand Cross of the Order of Merit of the Italian Republic
- 1992 – Officer of the French Legion of Honour
- 1993 – Commander of the Order of Cultural Merit (Monaco)

In November 2003, he was made a Commander of Monaco's Order of Cultural Merit.

He posthumously received the Italy-USA Foundation's America Award in 2013 and the Brit Award for Outstanding Contribution to Music in 2014.

Pavarotti was a National Patron of Delta Omicron, an international professional music fraternity.

=== Grammy Awards ===
The Grammy Awards are awarded annually by the National Academy of Recording Arts and Sciences.

Year	Nominee / work	Award	Result
1978	Luciano Pavarotti – O Holy Night	Best Classical Vocal Solo	Nominated
1979	Luciano Pavarotti – Hits From Lincoln Center	Best Classical Vocal Solo	Won
1980	Luciano Pavarotti & the Bologna Orchestra for O Sole Mio – Favorite Neapolitan Songs	Best Classical Vocal Solo	Won
1982	Marilyn Horne, Luciano Pavarotti, Joan Sutherland, Richard Bonynge (conductor) & the New York City Opera Orchestra for Live From Lincoln Center – Sutherland/Horne/Pavarotti	Best Classical Vocal Solo	Won
1982	Marilyn Horne, Luciano Pavarotti, Joan Sutherland, Richard Bonynge (conductor) & the New York City Opera Orchestra for Live From Lincoln Center – Sutherland/Horne/Pavarotti	Best Classical Album	Nominated
1987	Luciano Pavarotti Passione Pavarotti – Favorite Neapolitan Songs	Best Classical Vocal Solo	Nominated
1987	Verdi: Un Ballo In Maschera	Best Opera Recording	Nominated
1989	Luciano Pavarotti, Emerson Buckley (conductor) & the Symphony Orchestra of Amelia Romangna for Luciano Pavarotti in Concert	Best Classical Vocal Solo	Won
1989	Bellini: Norma	Best Opera Recording	Nominated
1989	Mozart: Idomeneo	Best Opera Recording	Nominated
1991	José Carreras, Plácido Domingo, Luciano Pavarotti, Zubin Mehta (conductor) & the Orchestra Del Maggio Musicale for Carreras, Domingo, Pavarotti in Concert	Best Classical Vocal Solo	Won
1991	José Carreras, Plácido Domingo, Luciano Pavarotti, Zubin Mehta (conductor) & the Orchestra Del Maggio Musicale for Carreras, Domingo, Pavarotti in Concert	Best Classical Album	Nominated
1995	José Carreras, Plácido Domingo and Luciano Pavarotti with Zubin Mehta – The Three Tenors in Concert 1994	Best Pop Vocal Album	Nominated
1995	José Carreras, Plácido Domingo and Luciano Pavarotti with Zubin Mehta – The Three Tenors in Concert 1994	Album of the Year	Nominated
1997	Frank Sinatra and Luciano Pavarotti – My Way	Best Pop Collaboration with Vocals	Nominated
1998	Luciano Pavarotti	MusiCares Person of the Year	Won
1998	Luciano Pavarotti	Grammy Legend Award	Won

=== Emmy Awards ===
The Emmy Awards are awarded annually by the Academy of Television Arts & Sciences.

Year	Nominee / work	Award	Result
1980	New York Philharmonic with Zubin Mehta and Luciano Pavarotti	Outstanding Classical Program in the Performing Arts	Nominated
1981	Joan Sutherland, Marilyn Horne and Luciano Pavarotti	Outstanding Classical Program in the Performing Arts	Nominated
1983	Pavarotti in Philadelphia: La bohème	Outstanding Classical Program in the Performing Arts	Won
1983	Live From Lincoln Center: Luciano Pavarotti and the Artists	Outstanding Individual Performance in a Variety or Music Program	Nominated
1985	Duke of Mantua, Rigoletto Great Performances	Outstanding Individual Performance in a Variety or Music Program	Won
1987	An Evening with Joan Sutherland and Luciano Pavarotti	Outstanding Classical Program in the Performing Arts	Nominated
1991	Pavarotti Plus! Live From Lincoln Center	Outstanding Classical Program in the Performing Arts	Nominated
1992	The 100th Telecast: Pavarotti Plus! Live From Lincoln Center	Outstanding Classical Program in the Performing Arts	Nominated
1994	Pavarotti In Paris	Outstanding Cultural Program	Nominated

=== Other awards and recognitions ===
- 1965 – Principessa Carlotta award
- 1980 – Grand Marshal at the New York City's Columbus Day Parade on 12 October. He decided to lead the parade riding a horse and wearing a cloak with stripes, stars and the colours of the US flag
- 1984 – Ville de Paris awarded by mayor Jacques Chirac
- 1986 – Favorite Classical Music Performer award from People's Choice Awards
- 1989 – Hamburger Kammersänger awarded by the Senate of Hamburg
- 1990 – Classical Artist of the Decade 1980–1989 awarded by Billboard
- 1993 – World's Best Classical Artist by the World Music Awards
- 1998 – United Nations Messenger of Peace by SG of the United Nations Kofi Annan
- 1998 – 22 November the Mayor of New York, Rudy Giuliani, proclaimed Luciano Pavarotti Day to celebrate his 30th anniversary at the Metropolitan Opera House.
- 1999 – Asteroid 5203 Pavarotti, discovered by Zdeňka Vávrová in 1984, was named after him
- 2001 – Kennedy Center Honors award
- 2001 – The Nansen Refugee Award given by United Nations High Commissioner for Refugees for his work on behalf of refugees and victims of conflict
- 2001 – World Social Award received from president Mikhail Gorbachev in Vienna
- 2004 – Eisenhower Medallion
- 2004 – NIAF Hall of Fame in Music by the National Italian American Foundation
- 2006 – Honorary citizenship by the city of Sarajevo for his efforts on behalf of Bosnian children
- 2006 – The Puccini Award in the 36th edition of Puccini Festival Foundation
- 2006 – Premio Donizetti in the Bergamo Music Festival
- 2007 – Premio Eccellenza nella cultura given by Italy's Ministry of Culture Francesco Rutelli, awarded 4 September, two days before his death
- Various honorary degrees from several universities, including Philadelphia, Pittsburgh, Oklahoma City, Parma, Urbino and Lima

=== Posthumous awards and recognitions ===
- 2013 – Premio America awarded by the Italy–USA Foundation
- 2013 – Lifetime Achievement Award at Classic BRIT Awards
- 2022 – Honored with a star on the Hollywood Walk of Fame, located at 7065 Hollywood Boulevard

== See also ==
- Pavarotti & Friends for the Children of Bosnia
- Pavarotti & Friends for the Children of Liberia
- Pavarotti & Friends for Guatemala and Kosovo
- Centro Educativo Pavarotti
- Pavarotti, a 2019 documentary film by Ron Howard
