= Zoster (band) =

Reggae group from Bosnia and Herzegovina

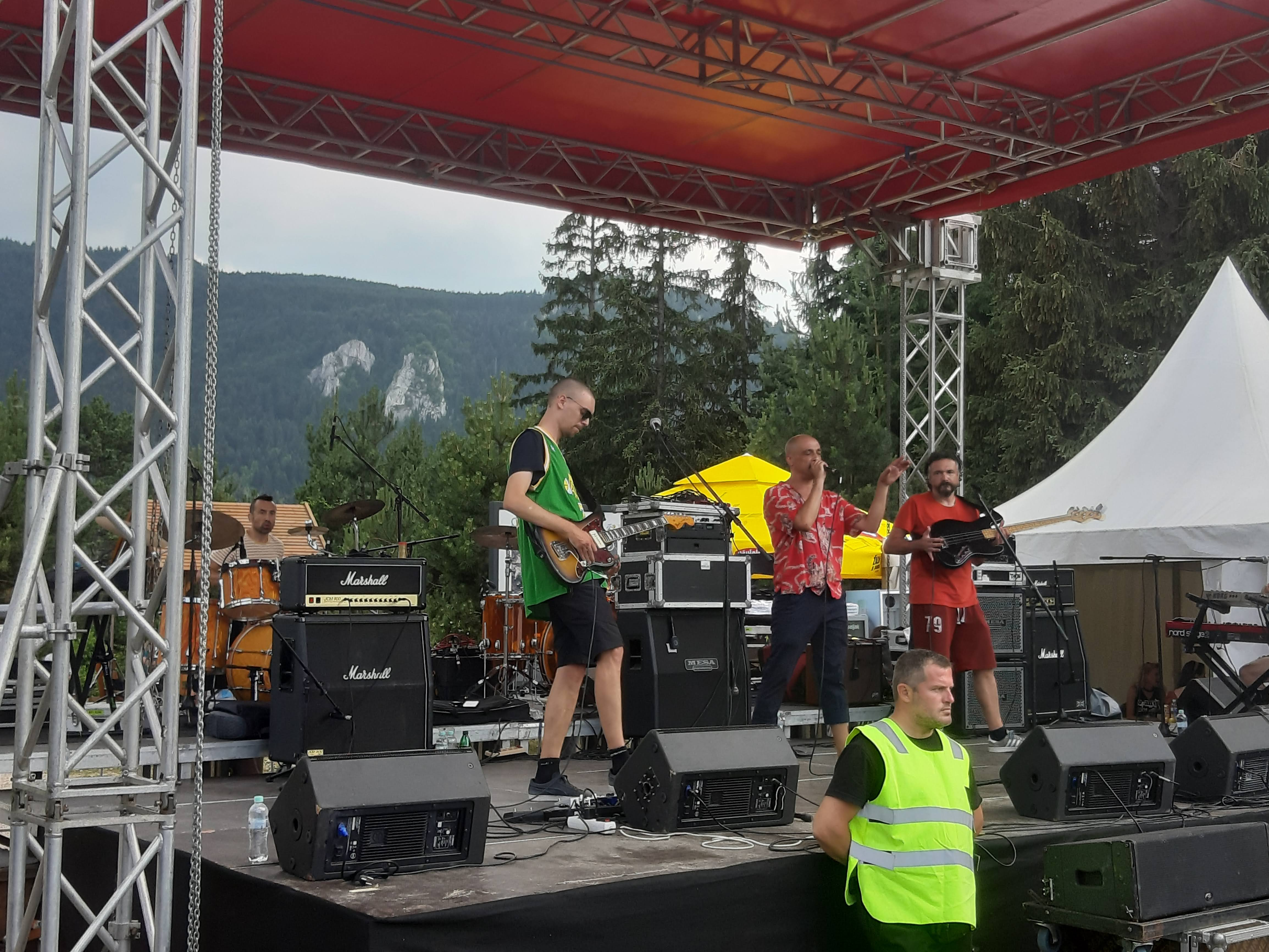
- Zoster performing at Vidikovac Fest in Sarajevo in July 2022

Background information
- Origin: Mostar, Bosnia and Herzegovina
- Genres: Reggae; Alternative rock
- Years active: 2000–present
- Labels: Gramofon, Menart, Croatia Records
- Members: Mario Knezović; Silvije Nuić; Adis Sirbubalo; Nikola Galić; Anes Beglerbegović
- Past members: Atilla Aksoj; Boris Gutić; Marko Jakovljević; Dražan Planinić

Zoster is an alternative rock-reggae group from Bosnia and Herzegovina formed in Mostar in 2000.

They released five studio albums – their latest studio album "Najgori" in 2023. Slogan of the band and concert greeting is "Band Zoster, Your Band".

== History ==
The group was formed in the fall of 2000 on the initiative of Mario Knezović and Dražan Planinić. The name Zoster appeared after Mario got over herpes zoster, a virus that lives in the human body, and when the immunity drops, it manifests itself on the surface of the skin in the form of a rash and spreads over time, and the Zoster group was created as a result of the drop in society's immunity.

Zoster believes that reggae music is suitable for these dangerous areas where the dose of aggressiveness even in music is too much. The group therefore conveys messages of tolerance, peace, progressiveness and affirmation, and sometimes education.

== Festivals ==
Zoster performed on several major regional festivals like Exit festival in Novi Sad, InMusic Festival in Zagreb, Sarajevo film festival, Lake fest Nikšić, Jazz fest Sarajevo, Soča Reggae Riversplash music festival, Seasplash Pula, OK Fest Tjentište, Arsenal fest Kragujevac, Bedem fest Nikšić, Love fest Vrnjačka Banja, Mostar Summer Fest and other.

== Discography ==
Studio albums:

- Ojužilo (Gramofon, 2005)
- Festival budala (Gramofon, 2007)
- Imači kada (Gramofon, 2012)
- Srce uzavrelo (Gramofon and Menart 2014)
- Najgori (Croatia Records, 2023)

Singles:

- Kuda idu svi ti ljudi (Croatia Records, 2020)
- Treba mi keš (Croatia Records, 2021)
- Čovjek želi da je ptica (2022)
- Čovjek zvani činjenica (2023)
