= Ernesto Tagliaferri =

Italian musician and composer (1889–1937)

Ernesto Tagliaferri (November 18, 1889 in Naples – March 6, 1937 in Naples), was an Italian musician and composer of Neapolitan songs. His songs are world-famous and have been recorded by many singers.

== Biography ==
Born in Naples on 18 November 1889, the father was a barber with his "Salon" in Via S. Antonio Abate in Naples. He graduated in violin and composition at the Conservatory S. Pietro a Maiella of Naples. He began his career directing main companies in the Eden and La Fenice theatres in Naples. During the First World War he started an orchestra giving concerts for the troops and composing patriotic songs like "Italia mia". In 1926 he started the musical publishing house La bottega dei Quattro (The Workshop of the Four) with the authors Bovio, Lama and Valente. He settled down in Torre del Greco with his wife Lucia D'Orlando, sister-in-law of tenor Francesco Albanese. He died suddenly the 6 March 1937 aged 48. The poet Libero Bovio expressed the funeral oration in the plaza of Torre del Greco.

== Famous songs ==
- Nun me scetà
- Italia mia
- Napule canta
- Napule ca se ne va
- Pusilleco
- Mandulinata a Napule
- Quì fu Napoli
- Piscatore e Pusilleco
- Quanno ammore vo' filà
- 'O cunto 'e Mariarosa
- Passione
