= Faris Arapović =

Bosnian drummer (1970–2019)

- Born: 1970; Sarajevo, SR Bosnia and Herzegovina, SFR Yugoslavia
- Died: 18 September 2019 (aged 48–49); Sarajevo, Bosnia and Herzegovina
- Occupation: Drummer
- Years active: 1987–2019
- Musical career
- Genres: New Primitivism; Rock; Alternative rock; Rock and roll
- Instrument: Drums
- Formerly of: Zabranjeno Pušenje; Sikter

Faris Arapović (1970 – 18 September 2019) was a Bosnian drummer. He was widely known as a drummer of Sarajevo-based rock bands Zabranjeno Pušenje and Sikter. Also, he was a founder of Sikter.

== Career ==
Arapović joined a Sarajevo-based rock band Zabranjeno Pušenje in 1986, after their drummer Predrag Rakić left. As a drummer, he performed on their two studio albums: Pozdrav iz zemlje Safari (1987) and Male priče o velikoj ljubavi (1989). In early 1990, he left the band with some other members.

In 1990, Arapović founded Sarajevo-based alternative rock band Sikter. Arapović performed on their first two studio albums: Now, Always, Never (2000) and Queen of the Disco (2002). In 2003, he parted ways with the band.

Arapović died on 18 September 2019.

== Discography ==
Sikter

- Now, Always, Never (2000)
- Queen of the Disco (2002)

Zabranjeno pušenje

- Pozdrav iz zemlje Safari (1987)
- Male priče o velikoj ljubavi (1989)
