= Sikter =

Bosnian alternative rock band

Background information
- Origin: Sarajevo, Bosnia and Herzegovina
- Genres: Punk rock (early), alternative rock, funk, disco music, house music
- Years active: 1990–2017
- Labels: Bock, Gramofon, Hayat Production
- Members: Enes Zlatar; Igor Čamo; Dragan Rokvić; Esad Bratović; Nedim Zlatar; Leonardo Šarić; Dejan Kajević
- Past members: Faris Arapović (deceased); Nebojša Šerić; Davor Tadić; Davor Čolić; Darko Jelisić; Nedžad Sladić (deceased); Igor Vukašinović (deceased); Sandi Ilić; Dušan Vranić; Hamdija Kreševljaković; Jan Kooper; Wilbrandt Meischke; Renato Foder; Režinald Šimek

Sikter was a Bosnian alternative rock band from Sarajevo. The band was formed in 1990 as a punk rock project of a few students, but became one of the most successful Bosnian rock bands. The name of the band is translated as Buzz Off!

From 1990 onwards, they changed lineups many times, as well as musical styles. Their first songs were parodies of Yugoslavian pop songs. Sikter became the first band from Bosnia and Herzegovina whose video "Pain in Brain" was broadcast on MTV for several months.

They recorded four albums: Now, Always, Never in 2000, Queen of the Disco in 2002, My Music in 2005 and Ego Trip in 2009. The album Now, Always, Never was produced by English musician Brian Eno.

== History ==
Sikter was formed in spring 1990 in Sarajevo. It was created spontaneously at a party at the Sarajevo Academy of Fine Arts. At the party, pop rock band Regina was supposed to play but when they began, Enes Zlatar, Igor Čamo, Faris Arapović, and Davor Čolić came to the stage and repelled Regina from stage with word Sikter, which means Buzz Off and started to play. After that party, Sikter was formed and they played a parody of Yugoslavian pop songs with punk rock elements. For their first two years, the band did not have a consistent lineup or rehearsals, so many musicians played in the band from 1990 to 1992.

By the beginning of the war in Bosnia and Herzegovina, the band's sound began evolving from punk rock to alternative rock band but still with elements of punk. During the Siege of Sarajevo, the city had a large alternative scene and numerous club concerts. Sikter was one of the most active bands during that period. They performed during the Rock Under Siege concert in rgw Sloga club organized by Radio ZID. In 1994, they performed as the opening act at a Bruce Dickinson concert in Sarajevo. MTV reported from their concert at the Obala Arts Center in Sarajevo.

In 1995, Haris Pašović invited the band members to join his theatre ensemble. During that time, a team of journalists from BBC came to Sarajevo and started to hang out with the band members. They decided to record their first music video for the song "Pain in Brain", which was directed by Haris Pašović. It aired often on MTV UK in 1995. In April 1995, Sikter visited London with the theatre ensemble to perform in the play "Silk Drums" at the festival Memories 45–95, but the theatre ensemble ultimately did not perform. Because the airport in Sarajevo was closed, they could not return to Bosnia and Herzegovina and were forced to remain in London for a couple of weeks. After that, they travelled to Amsterdam, and the band started to rehearse and play again. They performed several concerts in the Netherlands during 1995 and met producer Brian Eno in one of the Amsterdam clubs. Dutch saxophonist Jan Kooper also joined the band. In July 1995, Vasco Rossi invited the band to play on his double concert Rock sotto l'assedio, which held on San Siro stadium in Milan.

After the end of the war, Sikter returned to Bosnia and Herzegovina. In 1996, Rossi again invited them to join him on his tour across Italy. After Italy, the band went on tour in Belgium, France, and the Czech Republic during 1996. By the end of 1996, they started to rehearse and play in Bosnia while planning their debut album.

In 1997, Sikter performed as an opening act for U2 during their concert in Sarajevo. Sikter were also invited to open the Pavarotti Music Centre in Mostar and perform with Bono, Jovanotti, and Eno. Also, they reached an agreement with Eno for him to visit Mostar and help them to record their debut album. They started to record in the spring 1998 and completed it by the end of 1998.

The album Now, Always, Never was released on 21 November 2000, two years after it was recorded. Long-awaited in Bosnia and Herzegovina, the album received positive reviews. It was distributed internationally by The Orchard.

By the end of February 2002, band released a second album Queen of the Disco. The album was not well received due to the band changing their musical style from alternative rock to disco music.

In 2004, Sikter signed a contract with the record label Gramofon in Sarajevo, which issued their third album My Music and the single "Don't You Miss Me". The album was supported by the DVD My Documents in 2006. The DVD included a film about the band I Was Dreaming About Smirnoff Buffalo directed by Timur Makarević.

In 2009, the band released their last album Ego Trip. The album was released by one of the biggest labels in Bosnia and Herzegovina, Hayat Production.

At the start of the 2017, Sikter decided to disband and held a farewell concert on February 2, 2017, at Bosnian national television studio.

== Discography ==
Studio albums

- Now, Always, Never (2000)
- Queen of the Disco (2002)
- My Music (2005)
- Ego Trip (2009)

Singles

- "Don't You Miss Me" from the album My Music (2005)

Video releases

- My Documents (2006)

== Members ==
Final line-up

- Enes Zlatar - vocals, keyboards (1990–2017)
- Esad Bratović - guitar (1994–2017)
- Dragan Rokvić - bass, vocals (1996–2017)
- Igor Čamo - keyboards (1990, 2000–2017)
- Nedim Zlatar - drums (2002–2017)
- Leondardo Šarić - backing vocals (2005–2017)
- Dejan Kajević - backing vocals (2005–2017)

Former members

- Faris Arapović (deceased) - drums (1990, 1993–2002)
- Davor Tadić - bass (1990–1992)
- Davor Čolić - guitar (1990–1992)
- Darko Jelisić - drums (1990–1992)
- Nebojša Šerić - bass, guitar (1990–1995)
- Nedžad Sladić (deceased) - guitar (1990–1992)
- Igor Vukašinović (deceased) - guitar (1992–1993)
- Sandi Ilić - bass (1993)
- Dušan Vranić - keyboards (1994)
- Hamdija Kreševljaković - bass (1995)
- Jan Kooper - saxophone (1995, 2006)
- Wilbrandt Meischke - bass (1995)
- Renato Foder - keyboards (2002)
- Režinald Šimek - keyboards (2004–2006)
