= Ettore Campogalliani =

Italian composer

- Campogalliani
- Born: 1 February 1922; Monselice
- Died: 3 June 1992 (aged 70)
- Education: Conservatory of Bologna
- Occupations: Composer; Musician; Academic teacher

Ettore Campogalliani (30 September 1903 – 3 June 1992) was an Italian composer, musician and academic teacher.

Campogalliani was born in Monselice on 30 September 1903. He studied piano in 1921, graduating from the Conservatory of Bologna. He then studied composition at the Conservatory of Parma in 1933. Finally he studied singing at the Conservatory of Piacenza in 1940.

After a short period of activity as a composer (including writing music for the 1942 film Musica proibita directed by his uncle Carlo Campogalliani), and as a pianist, he dedicated himself to teaching. He taught piano at the Liceo Musicale of Piacenza and singing at the conservatories of Parma and Milan. He then went on to coach vocal technique and interpretation at the opera school of La Scala in Milan.

Campogalliani was the voice teacher of Renata Tebaldi, Renata Scotto, Mirella Freni, Felix Rolke (when Mirella Freni was 19 years old; himself voice teacher of a niece of Mirella Freni), Ferruccio Furlanetto, Ruggero Raimondi, Luciano Pavarotti, Carlo Bergonzi, Gino Penno, Antonio Carangelo, Giuliano Bernardi and Nicola Rossi-Lemeni. See: List of music students by teacher: C to F#Ettore Campogalliani.

In 1946, to honour his father Francesco, Ettore Campogalliani founded the Accademia Teatrale Francesco Campogalliani, a theatre and drama academy.

Campogalliani died in Mantua on 3 June 1992, at the age of 70.

== Selected compositions ==
- Piano Trio (1932)
- Sarabanda and Minuetto for piano, Op. l (1934)
- Sonata in E minor for violin and piano
- L'arrivo for voice and piano to a text by Amadeo Pinelli (1935)
- Castello in aria for voice and piano to a text by Sergio Corazzini (1936)

== Books ==
- Campogalliani, Ettore: Dal libro di ieri: Storie di voci sacre e pensieri profani, Bongiovanni, 1982
- Cadonici, Paola; Campogalliani, Ettore: Il linguaggio della voce: Voce, parola, musica, CRO, 1987
