= Pavarotti Music Centre =

Coordinates: 43°20′05″N 17°49′03″E

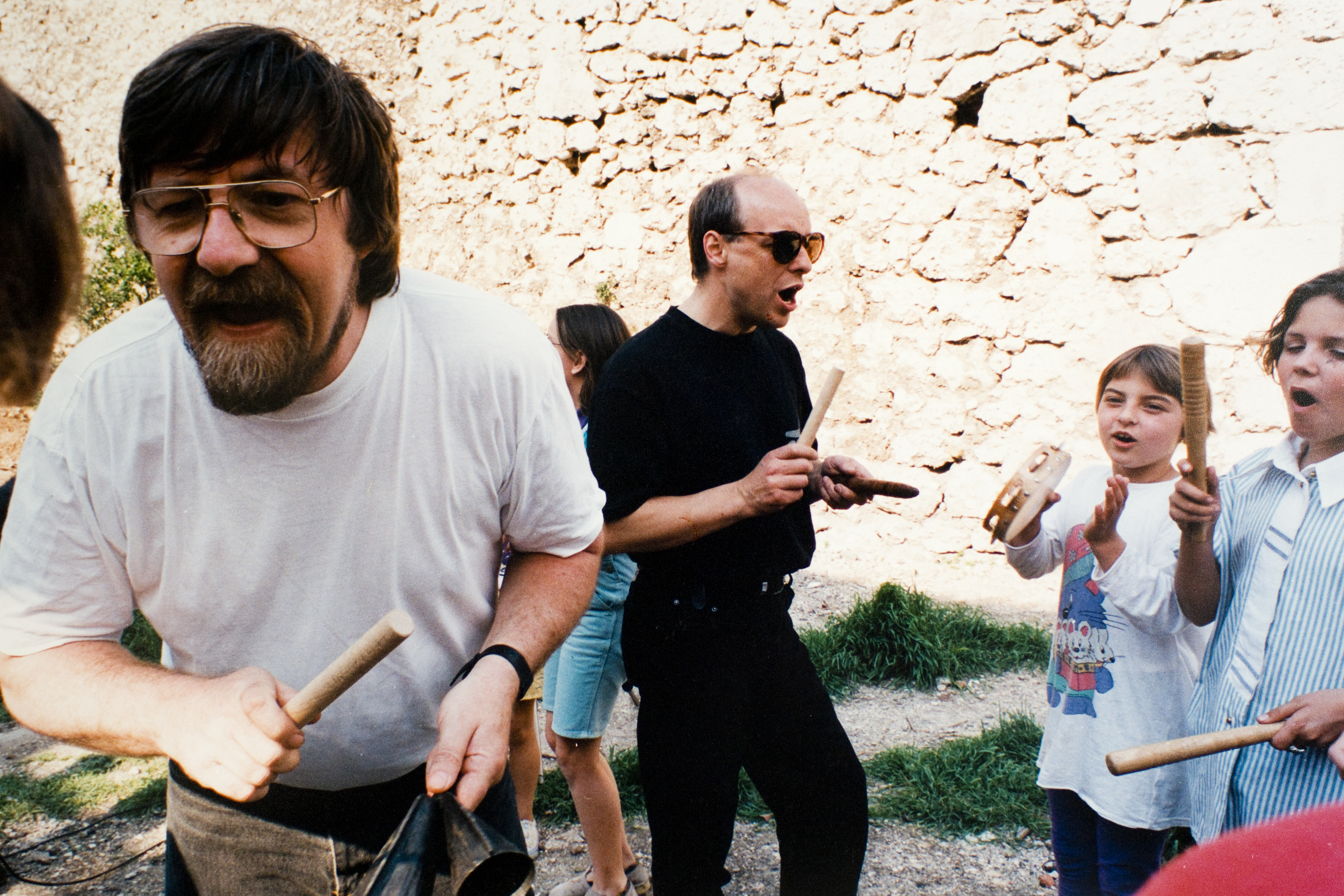
Nigel Osborne & Brian Eno working in Mostar with Pavarotti Music Center 1994-1995.

Pavarotti Music Centre (Croatian and Bosnian: Muzički centar Pavarotti) is a non-profit arts institution located in Mostar, Bosnia and Herzegovina. It was opened on 21 December 1997 and its premises are located in a former primary school. It was funded entirely by War Child thanks to a number of concerts organized by Luciano Pavarotti, Brian Eno, members of U2 and other artists. The center provides music education for young people and other services, such as workshops, dance classes, and theatre performances. The Centre is housed within a building constructed in 1908 during the Austrian-Hungarian period according to the project of architect D. Knezic.

== Activities ==
Pavarotti Music Centre offers a variety of educational and creative activities for children and teens and it often employs elements of creative therapy. It also engages in a variety of art programs in Mostar and the region. The Center strives to revive art scene of local communities by organizing various lectures and seminars, providing space and equipment for non-profit organizations, institutions and individuals. It promotes development of relations and cooperation with other cultural, youth, educational and social organizations at the local level and internationally.
