= Segundo López =

1953 film

- Directed by: Ana Mariscal
- Written by: Leocadio Mejías; Ana Mariscal
- Produced by: Ana Mariscal
- Starring: Ana Mariscal
- Cinematography: Valentín Javier
- Edited by: Francisco García Velázquez; Margarita de Ochoa
- Music by: Antón Apruzzese; Rafael Franco
- Production company: Bosco Films
- Distributed by: Bosco Films
- Release date: 5 February 1953
- Running time: 80 minutes
- Country: Spain
- Language: Spanish

Segundo López or Segundo López, Urban Adventurer (Spanish:Segundo López, aventurero urbano) is a 1953 Spanish drama film directed by and starring Ana Mariscal. It marked the directoral debut of Mariscal, a leading actress of General Franco's Spain. The film's style contains elements of neorealism, dealing with social issues primarily affecting migrants from the countryside.

== Plot ==
An honest man from the provinces arrives in Madrid for a living, with no more baggage than a little money and plainness. He befriends a street urchin, "The Chirri", and both live countless urban adventures.

== Cast ==
- Ana Mariscal as Marta
- Luisa Esteso
- Martín Ramírez as Chirri
- Tony Leblanc as Fotógrafo
- Adela Carboné
- Mariano Azaña as Podólogo
- Dolores Bremón
- Matilde Artero
- Emilio González de Hervás
- Ernesto Lapeña
- José Luis Alonso
- Carlos Fernández Cuenca
- Manuel Mur Oti
- Leocadio Mejías as El escritor
- Severiano Población as Segundo López

== Bibliography ==
- Bentley, Bernard. A Companion to Spanish Cinema. Boydell & Brewer 2008.
