= Lawless Mountain =

1953 film by Miguel Lluch

- Directed by: Miguel Lluch
- Written by: José Germán Huici
- Starring: José Suárez; Isabel de Castro
- Cinematography: Pablo Ripoll
- Edited by: Ramon Quadreny
- Music by: Augusto Algueró
- Production company: Ignacio Ferrés Iquino Producción
- Distributed by: IFISA
- Release date: 21 September 1953
- Running time: 95 minutes
- Country: Spain
- Language: Spanish

Lawless Mountain (Spanish: La montaña sin ley) is a 1953 Spanish western film directed by Miguel Lluch and starring José Suárez, Isabel de Castro and Teresa Abad.

== Cast ==
- José Suárez as Zorro
- Isabel de Castro as María
- Teresa Abad
- Juan Balañá
- Barta Barri
- Jesús Colomer
- Luis Induni
- Paco Martínez Soria
- Pedro Mascaró
- Jorge Morales
- Carlos Otero
- José Manuel Pinillos
- Ramón Quadreny
- María Zaldívar

== Bibliography ==
- Pitts, Michael R. Western Movies: A Guide to 5,105 Feature Films. McFarland, 2012.
