= Gone to the Mountain =

- Directed by: Alfonso Ungría
- Written by: Alfonso Ungría
- Produced by: Luis Mamerto López-Tapia
- Starring: Julieta Serrano; Yelena Samarina; José Renovales
- Cinematography: Ramón F. Suárez
- Edited by: Roberto Fandiño
- Music by: Carmelo A. Bernaola
- Production company: Mota Films
- Release date: 1974
- Running time: 102 minutes
- Country: Spain
- Language: Spanish

Gone to the Mountain (Spanish:Tirarse al monte) is a 1974 Spanish drama film directed by Alfonso Ungría and starring Julieta Serrano, Yelena Samarina and José Renovales.

== Cast ==
- Julieta Serrano
- Yelena Samarina
- José Renovales
- Luis Ciges
- Francisco Llinás
- Andrés Mejuto
- Carlos Otero as Guardia
- Mario Gas
- Maxi Martín
- Ricardo Lucía
- José Vidal
- Manuel Pereiro
- María Reniu as Chica del cementerio
- Carlos Vasallo
- Luis Alonso
- Danièle Juving as Conchita

== Bibliography ==
- Bentley, Bernard. A Companion to Spanish Cinema. Boydell & Brewer 2008.
