= En carne viva =

En carne viva may refer to:

- En carne viva (1951 film), a Mexican drama film
- En carne viva (1954 film), an Argentine film
