= Carlos Larrañaga =

Spanish actor (1937–2012)

- Born: Carlos Larrañaga Ladrón de Guevara; 11 March 1937; Barcelona, Spanish Republic
- Died: 30 August 2012 (aged 75); Málaga, Spain
- Occupation: Actor
- Spouse(s): Ana Escribano (2006–his death); María Teresa Ortiz-Bau (2000–2006); Ana Diosdado (1979–1999); María Luisa Merlo (1959–1975)
- Awards: Cinema Writers Circle Award for Best Supporting Actor; 2008 Luz de Domingo; TP de Oro Award for Best Actor; 1993 Farmacia de Guardia; 1995 Farmacia de Guardia

Carlos Larrañaga Ladrón de Guevara (11 March 1937 – 30 August 2012) was a Spanish actor.

== Biography ==
=== Personal life ===
Larrañaga was born in Barcelona to actress María Fernanda Ladrón de Guevara, and was the half-brother of actress Amparo Rivelles. He was the father of Amparo Larrañaga, Pedro Larrañaga and Luis Merlo, all actors, and the father-in-law of actress Maribel Verdú.

=== Career ===
His film debut was in 1941, at age four, in Alma de Dios, directed by Ignacio F. Iquino. His first success was in 1950 with Pequeñeces, directed by Juan de Orduña. He had a major supporting role in The Pride and the Passion with Cary Grant, Frank Sinatra and Sophia Loren and then starred in Ha llegado un ángel and El extraño viaje, among other films. His most remembered role is in the TV series Farmacia de guardia (1991–1995) directed by Antonio Mercero.

== Death ==
Carlos Larrañaga died on 30 August 2012 at age 75 in Málaga. He died from heart disease

== Selected filmography ==
- Heart of Gold (1941) - Niño de Ezequiela
- Serenata española (1947) - Isaac Albéniz (niño)
- Cita con mi viejo corazón (1950)
- Pequeñeces (1950) - Paquito
- The Adventures of Gil Blas (1956) - Le Prince
- The Pride and the Passion (1957) - Jose
- Classe di ferro (1957)
- La puerta abierta (1957) - Pedro
- ...Y eligió el infierno (1957)
- 15 bajo la lona (1959) - Fernando Fresneda
- Parque de Madrid (1959)
- Un vaso de whisky (1959) - Carlos Aranda
- A sangre fría (1959) - Carlos
- The Little Colonel (1960) - Teniente Eduardo Aranda
- El traje de oro (1960) - Quique
- Peaches in Syrup (1960) - Carlos
- La moglie di mio marito (1961) - Baldassarre
- Siega verde (1961) - Enric Pujalt
- Ha llegado un ángel (1961) - Javier
- Siempre es domingo (1961) - Luis Lara
- La alternativa (1963)
- El extraño viaje (1964) - Fernando
- De cuerpo presente (1967) - Nelson
- Escuela de enfermeras (1968) - Dr. Ramón Terán
- Las amigas (1969) - Príncipe
- Casa Flora (1973) - Ramón
- Los pájaros de Baden-Baden (1975) - Ricardo
- Las verdes praderas (1979) - Ricardo González de Sotillo
- Los locos vecinos del 2º (1980) - Julio
- Gay Club (1981) - Gobernador civil
- 127 millones libres de impuestos (1981) - Manolo
- Adolescencia (1982) - Antonio
- Y del seguro... líbranos Señor! (1983) - Ramiro
- Redondela (1987) - Arturo Méndez
- Farmacia de Guardia (1991-1996) Adolfo Segura
- Pesadilla para un rico (1996) - Álvaro
- Atraco a las 3... y media (2003) - Otto
- Tiovivo c. 1950 (2004) - Marcelino
- Escuela de seducción (2004)
- Bienvenido a casa (2006) - Andrés
- The Last Gateway (2007) - Sheriff McOwen
- Luz de domingo (2007) - Atila
- Sangre de Mayo (2008) - Isidoro Máiquez
- Malditos sean! (2011) - (segment "Alimenta la caja")
- Los muertos no se tocan, nene (2011) - Doctor Salamoya (final film role)
