= Persecution in Madrid =

1952 film

- Directed by: Enrique Gómez
- Written by: Ignacio F. Iquino; Juan Lladó
- Starring: Manuel Monroy
- Cinematography: Emilio Foriscot; Pablo Ripoll
- Edited by: Juan Pallejá; Ramon Quadreny
- Music by: Augusto Algueró
- Production company: IFI Producción
- Distributed by: Universal Films Española
- Release date: 11 August 1952
- Running time: 86 minutes
- Country: Spain
- Language: Spanish

Persecution in Madrid (Spanish:Persecución en Madrid) is a 1952 Spanish crime film directed by Enrique Gómez.

== Cast ==
- Francisco Albiñana
- Barta Barri
- Roberto Camardiel
- Isabel de Castro
- María Victoria Durá
- Ramón Fernández
- María Francés
- Manuel Gas
- Ramón Giner
- Liria Izquierdo
- Manuel Monroy
- José Morales
- Silvia Morgan
- Manolo Morán
- Carlos Otero
- Fernando Porredón
- Luis Pérez de León
- Miguel Ángel Valdivieso

== Bibliography ==
- Bentley, Bernard. A Companion to Spanish Cinema. Boydell & Brewer 2008.
