= The Football Lottery =

1960 film

- Directed by: Ana Mariscal
- Written by: Antonio de Lara; Luis Ligero; Tono Ligero; Ramón Agustín Valdivieso
- Starring: Rafaela Aparicio; José Calvo; Raúl Cancio
- Cinematography: Valentín Javier
- Music by: Juan Solano Pedrero
- Production company: Bosco Films
- Distributed by: Universal Films Española
- Release date: 29 August 1960
- Running time: 90 minutes
- Country: Spain
- Language: Spanish

The Football Lottery (Spanish: La quiniela) is a 1960 Spanish comedy film directed by Ana Mariscal.

== Cast ==
- Rafaela Aparicio
- José Calvo
- Raúl Cancio
- Félix Dafauce
- Rafael Durán
- Félix Fernández
- Ana Mariscal
- Manuel Monroy
- Erasmo Pascual
- Manuel Peiró
- Joaquín Roa
- Ángel Álvarez

== Bibliography ==
- Timothy J. Ashton. Soccer in Spain: Politics, Literature, and Film. Scarecrow Press, 2013.
