= They Fired with Their Lives =

- Directed by: Ana Mariscal
- Written by: Ana Mariscal; Jesús Evaristo Casariego (novel); Jesús Evaristo Casariego
- Produced by: Ana Mariscal; Augusto Boué
- Starring: Ana Mariscal
- Cinematography: Valentín Javier
- Edited by: Sara Ontañón
- Music by: Salvador Ruiz de Luna
- Production company: Bosco Films
- Distributed by: PROCINES
- Release date: 21 September 1959
- Running time: 80 minutes
- Country: Spain
- Language: Spanish

They Fired with Their Lives (Spanish: Con la vida hicieron fuego) is a 1959 Spanish war film directed by and starring Ana Mariscal. It is set against the backdrop of the Spanish Civil War.

== Cast ==
- Ana Mariscal as Armandina
- George Rigaud as Quico
- Roberto Rey as Fernando
- José María Lado as Manolón
- Raúl Cancio as Marinín
- Ángel Aranda as Falin
- Malila Sandoval as Isabelita
- Nicolás D. Perchicot as Raimundo
- Adela Carboné
- Manuel Requena as Joaquín
- Rafael Bardem as Viqueira
- Manuel Guitián
- Félix Briones
- Matilde Artero
- Ángel Álvarez
- Enrique Ferpi
- Francisco René
- Manuel Flores
- Mary Lamar as Viuda de Marinín

== Bibliography ==
- Bentley, Bernard. A Companion to Spanish Cinema. Boydell & Brewer 2008.
