= There's a Road on the Right =

1953 film by Francisco Rovira Beleta

- Directed by: Francisco Rovira Beleta
- Written by: Manuel María Saló Vilanova; Francisco Rovira Beleta
- Produced by: Antonio Bofarull
- Starring: Francisco Rabal; Julia Martínez; Carlos Otero
- Cinematography: Salvador Torres Garriga
- Edited by: Albert Gasset Nicolau
- Music by: Federico Martínez Tudó
- Production company: Titán Films
- Distributed by: Titán Films
- Release date: 28 October 1953
- Running time: 96 minutes
- Country: Spain
- Language: Spanish

There's a Road on the Right (Spanish: Hay un camino a la derecha) is a 1953 Spanish drama film directed by Francisco Rovira Beleta and starring Francisco Rabal, Julia Martínez and Carlos Otero.

== Cast ==
- Francisco Rabal as Miguel
- Julia Martínez as Inés
- Carlos Otero as Goyo
- Manuel García as Víctor
- Juan Manuel Soriano as Tormo
- José Ramón Giner as El Chiva
- José Luis García as El Zurdo
- Ramón Hernández as El Chepa
- José Manuel Pinillos as El Aldeano
- Enrique Borrás as Don Andrés
- Consuelo de Nieva as Florista
- Salvador Muñoz as Cirujano
- Luz de Sevilla as Bailarina
- Isabel de Castro as Maruja
- Antonio Bofarull as Vicente

== Bibliography ==
- D'Lugo, Marvin. Guide to the Cinema of Spain. Greenwood Publishing, 1997.
