= Man in Hiding =

Man in Hiding or The Man in Hiding is the title of two films:

- Man in Hiding, American title of Mantrap (1953 film), a British crime film
- The Man in Hiding (Spanish title: El hombre oculto), a 1971 Spanish drama
