= La Dama de Beirut =

- Directed by: Ladislao Vajda
- Written by: Jesús María de Arozamena, Alfonso Balcázar
- Cinematography: Christian Matras
- Edited by: Alfonso Santacana
- Music by: Gregorio García Segura
- Release date: 1965
- Countries: Italy, Spain, France
- Languages: Italian, Spanish

La Dama de Beirut is a 1965 Italian film directed by Ladislao Vajda.

== Cast ==
- Sara Montiel as Isabel Llanos
- Fernand Gravey as Dr. Castello
- Giancarlo Del Duca as Francis Castello
- Magali Noël as Gloria Lefevre
- Alain Saury as Xandro Lakaris 'el griego'
- José Calvo
- Gemma Cuervo as Amparo
- Carlos Casaravilla
- Daniele Vargas
- Marcel Lupovici
- Joaquín Díaz as Selim
- Chonette Laurent as Lucila Morales
- Luis Padrós
- Mariano Azaña
- César Ojinaga
- Ricardo Valor
