= A Man on the Road =

1949 film by Manuel Mur Oti

- Directed by: Manuel Mur Oti
- Written by: Manuel Mur Oti
- Starring: Ana Mariscal; Fernando Nogueras; Pacita de Landa
- Cinematography: Manuel Berenguer
- Edited by: Antonio Gimeno
- Music by: Jesús García Leoz
- Production company: Sagitario Films
- Release date: 30 December 1949
- Running time: 92 minutes
- Country: Spain
- Language: Spanish

A Man on the Road (Spanish: Un hombre va por el camino) is a 1949 Spanish drama film directed by Manuel Mur Oti and starring Ana Mariscal, Fernando Nogueras and Pacita de Landa.

== Cast ==
- Ana Mariscal as Julia
- Fernando Nogueras as Luis Rodríguez
- Pacita de Landa as Blanca
- Julia Pachelo
- Matilde Artero
- Manuel Guitián
- Francisco Arenzana
- Enrique Ramirez
- Felisa Ortuondo
- Aurelia Barceló
- Marina Lorca

== Awards ==
CEC Awards

Category	Person	Result
Best Actress	Ana Mariscal	Winner
Best Cinematography	Manuel Berenguer	Winner
Best Music	Jesús García Leoz	Winner
Premio Jimeno	Manuel Mur Oti	Winner
