= Heart of Gold (1941 film) =

1941 film

- Directed by: Ignacio F. Iquino
- Written by: Carlos Arniches (play); Aureliano Campa; Enrique García Álvarez (play); Ignacio F. Iquino
- Produced by: Aureliano Campa
- Starring: Amparo Rivelles
- Cinematography: Emilio Foriscot
- Edited by: Juan Serra
- Music by: José Serrano
- Production company: CIFESA
- Distributed by: CIFESA
- Release date: 15 September 1941
- Running time: 74 minutes
- Country: Spain
- Language: Spanish

Heart of Gold (Spanish: Alma de Dios) is a 1941 Spanish comedy film directed by Ignacio F. Iquino and starring Amparo Rivelles.

== Cast ==
In alphabetical order

- José Acuaviva as Orencio
- Matilde Artero as Rosa
- Juan Barajas as Tío Zuro
- Trini Borrull as dancer
- Miguel García as Pepe
- Manuel González as Adrián
- Teresa Idel as Marcelina
- José Isbert as El tío Matías
- Carlos Larrañaga as Niño de Ezequiela
- Paco Martínez Soria as Saturiano
- Guadalupe Muñoz Sampedro as Ezequiela
- Luis Prendes as Agustín
- Amparo Rivelles as Eloísa
- Eulalia Rodriguez as Balbina
- Francisco Sanz as Pelegrín
- Pilar Soler as Irene

== Bibliography ==
- Bentley, Bernard. A Companion to Spanish Cinema. Boydell & Brewer 2008.
