= Enrique Gómez (director) =

- Born: 1919; Barcelona, Spain
- Died: 1955 (aged 35–36); Madrid, Spain
- Other name: Enrique Gómez Bascuas
- Occupations: Director, Screenwriter
- Years active: 1935-1954(film)

Enrique Gómez (1916–1955) was a Spanish screenwriter and film director. Gómez was a Catalan from Barcelona, who directed eleven feature films between 1945 and 1954, including the bullfighting saga The Party Goes On (1948), before his career was ended by his early death.

== Selected filmography ==
- The Party Goes On (1948)
- Persecution in Madrid (1952)

== Bibliography ==
- Bentley, Bernard. A Companion to Spanish Cinema. Boydell & Brewer 2008.
