= Farmacia de guardia =

- Directed by: Antonio Mercero
- Starring: Concha Cuetos; Carlos Larrañaga; Miguel Ángel Garzón; Julián González; Emma Ozores; África Gozalbes; Maruchi León; Eva Isanta; Alicia Rozas; Esperanza Grases; María Luisa Ponte; Luis Ciges; María Garralón; Cesáreo Estebánez; Álvaro de Luna; Amparo Valle; Amparo Moreno; Miguel Ángel Valcárcel; Iñaki Vallejo; María Adánez; Caco Senante; Ángel Pardo; Kim Manning
- Country of origin: Spain
- Original language: Spanish
- No. of seasons: 5
- No. of episodes: 169

Production
- Producer: Andrés Gandara
- Running time: 30 minutos (approx.)

Original release
- Network: Antena 3
- Release: September 19, 1991 – December 28, 1995

Farmacia de guardia ("Pharmacy on Duty") is a Spanish comedy serial, originally broadcast on Antena 3 from 1991 to 1995. It is set in a drugstore.

== Cast ==
- Concha Cuetos - Lourdes Cano
- Carlos Larrañaga - Adolfo Segura
- José Soriano - Don Enrique Cano
- Maruchi León - Pili Fernández
- África Gozalbes - Reyes «Queen» González
- Miguel Ángel Garzón - Enrique Segura
- Julián González - Guillermo Segura

== Awards ==
Year	Award	Category	Nominee	Result
1991	Premios TP de Oro:	Mejor serie nacional		Won
1991	Premios TP de Oro:	Mejor actriz principal	Concha Cuetos	Won
1991	Premios TP de Oro:	Mejor actor principal	Carlos Larrañaga	Nominated
1992	Premios Ondas	Mejor serie nacional		Won
1992	Premios TP de Oro	Mejor serie nacional		Won
1992	Premios TP de Oro	Mejor actriz principal	Concha Cuetos	Won
1992	Premios TP de Oro	Mejor actor principal	Carlos Larrañaga	Won
1993	Fotogramas de Plata	Mejor actriz de televisión	Concha Cuetos	Won
1993	Fotogramas de Plata	Mejor actriz de televisión	María Luisa Ponte	Nominated
1993	Fotogramas de Plata	Mejor actor de televisión	Carlos Larrañaga	Nominated
1993	Premios de la Unión de Actores:	Mejor actriz principal de televisión	Concha Cuetos	Nominated
1993	Premios de la Unión de Actores:	Mejor actriz secundaria de televisión	Maruchi León	Nominated
1993	Premios de la Unión de Actores:	Mejor actor secundario de televisión	Cesáreo Estébanez	Nominated
1993	Premios TP de Oro	Mejor serie nacional		Won
1993	Premios TP de Oro	Mejor actriz principal	Concha Cuetos	Won
1993	Premios TP de Oro	Mejor actor principal	Carlos Larrañaga	Nominated
1993	Premio ADIRCAE	Mejor serie de televisión		Won
1994	Premios Ondas	Mejor actor secundario de televisión	Cesáreo Estébanez	Won
1994	Premios TP de Oro	Mejor serie nacional		Won
1994	Premios TP de Oro	Mejor actor principal	Carlos Larrañaga	Won
1994	Premios TP de Oro	Mejor actriz principal	Concha Cuetos	Nominated
1995	Premios Ondas	Mejor actriz principal de televisión	Concha Cuetos	Nominated
1995	Premios TP de Oro:	Mejor serie nacional		Nominated
1995	Premios TP de Oro:	Mejor actor principal	Carlos Larrañaga	Nominated
1995	Premios TP de Oro:	Mejor actriz principal	Concha Cuetos	Nominated
