= Jesús Evaristo Casariego Fernández-Noriega =

Spanish writer (1913–1990)

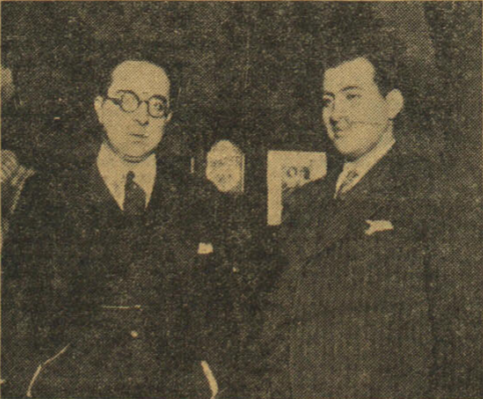
- Born: Jesús Evaristo Casariego Fernández-Noriega; 1912; Tineo, Spain
- Died: 1990; Luarca, Spain
- Known for: writer
- Political party: Carlism

Jesús Evaristo Díaz-Casariego y Fernández-Noriega (7 November 1913 – 16 September 1990) was a Spanish writer and publisher, popular especially during the early and mid-Francoism. Among some 60 books and booklets he wrote most are popular and semi-scientific historiographic works, though he was known chiefly as a novelist, especially as the author of Con la vida hicieron fuego (1953). In the early 1940s he managed a vehemently militant Francoist daily El Alcazár, yet in his youth and older age he was active as a Carlist. Today he is considered the author of second-rate literature, occasionally recognized as expert on Asturian culture and history.

== Family and youth ==
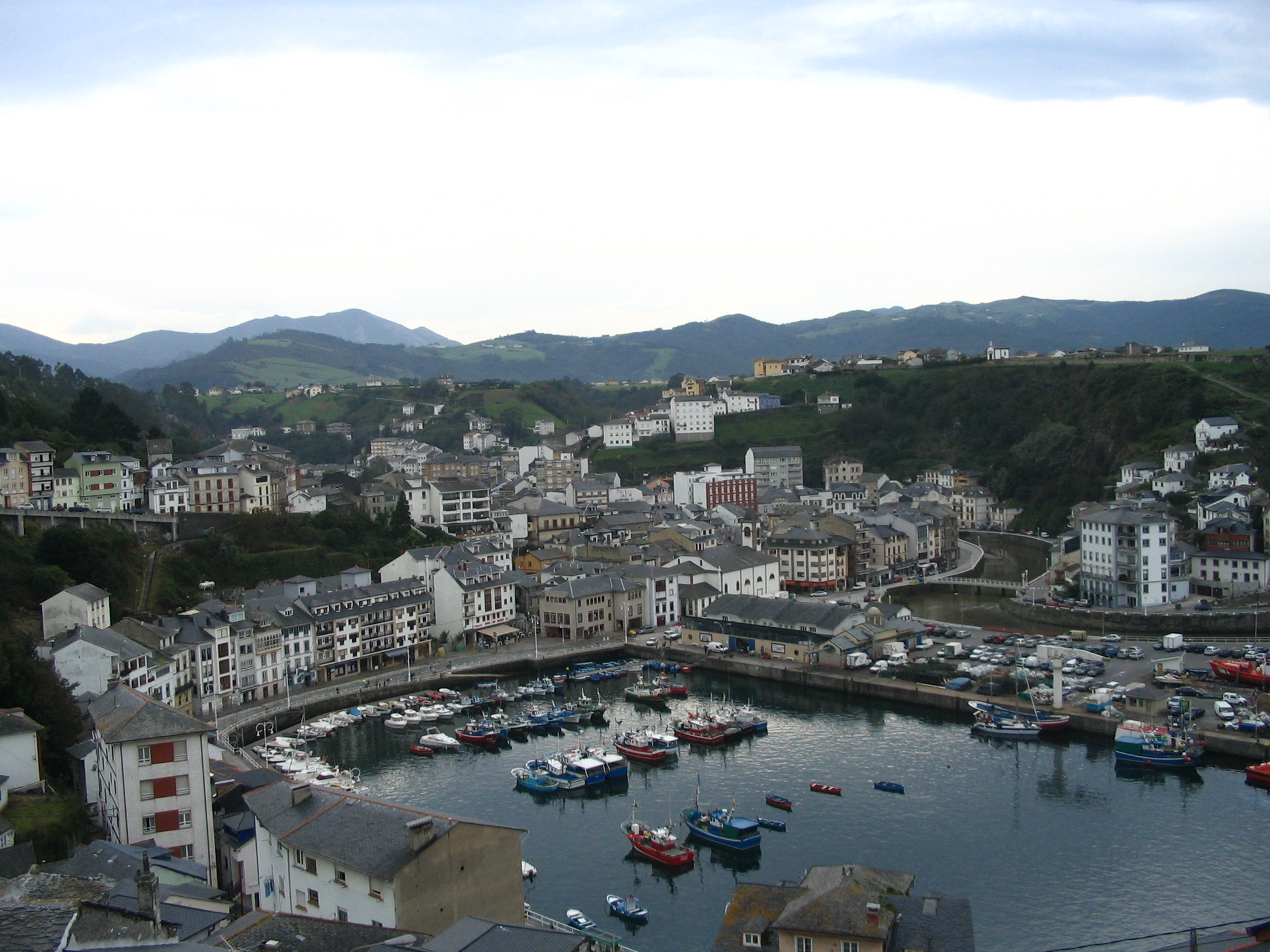
Luarca

The best known of Casariego's ancestors was an admiral who in the late 16th century served as governor of Florida. The family got very branched in course of the following centuries, yet none of its members rose to similar honors; one of its arms, the Casariegos, have always been related to Western Asturias. The paternal grandfather of Jesús Evaristo, Evaristo Díaz-Casariego y López-Acevedo (1849-1930), served in the navy; he held various posts in Spain and overseas and fought in the Spanish–American War. Though not exactly a writer he developed some knack for letters and published a number of navy-related manuals. He married Carmen de Pazos y Rodríguez-Varela; the couple had only one child, Jesús Díaz-Casariego Pazos, born in Aviles. He opted for a civilian career and practiced as a dentist, first in Luarca and then in Gijón. In 1913 he married Ramona Fernandez Noriega from Tineo, daughter to a local fiscal municipal and former indiano. The couple settled in Luarca and had 6 children, Jesús Evaristo born as the oldest one.

As a child Jesús Evaristo was brought up mostly by his paternal grandparents, who pursued a very traditional education model; as a mature man he later applauded them for childhood "con estilo antigue y virtuoso en el santo temor de Dios y en fidelidad constante a los grandes ideas de mi raza". He spent early years in Luarca and Tineo, and obtained bachillerato in an unnamed institution in Tineo. At unspecified time in the late 1920s he enrolled at the Faculty of Law of the University of Oviedo; he graduated in the early 1930s in Madrid. Though educated to be a lawyer, during his academic years Casariego was tempted by letters, especially that apart from his grandfather also other of his ancestors and some distant relatives tried their hand in literature. The young Jesús Evaristo started to follow the Filosofía y Letras curriculum in Madrid; in the mid-1930s he also studied history in Germany. Already in 1929 he started contributing to the local Asturian daily Región, in the early 1930s to Madrid-based La Nación and El Siglo Futuro, and other periodicals.

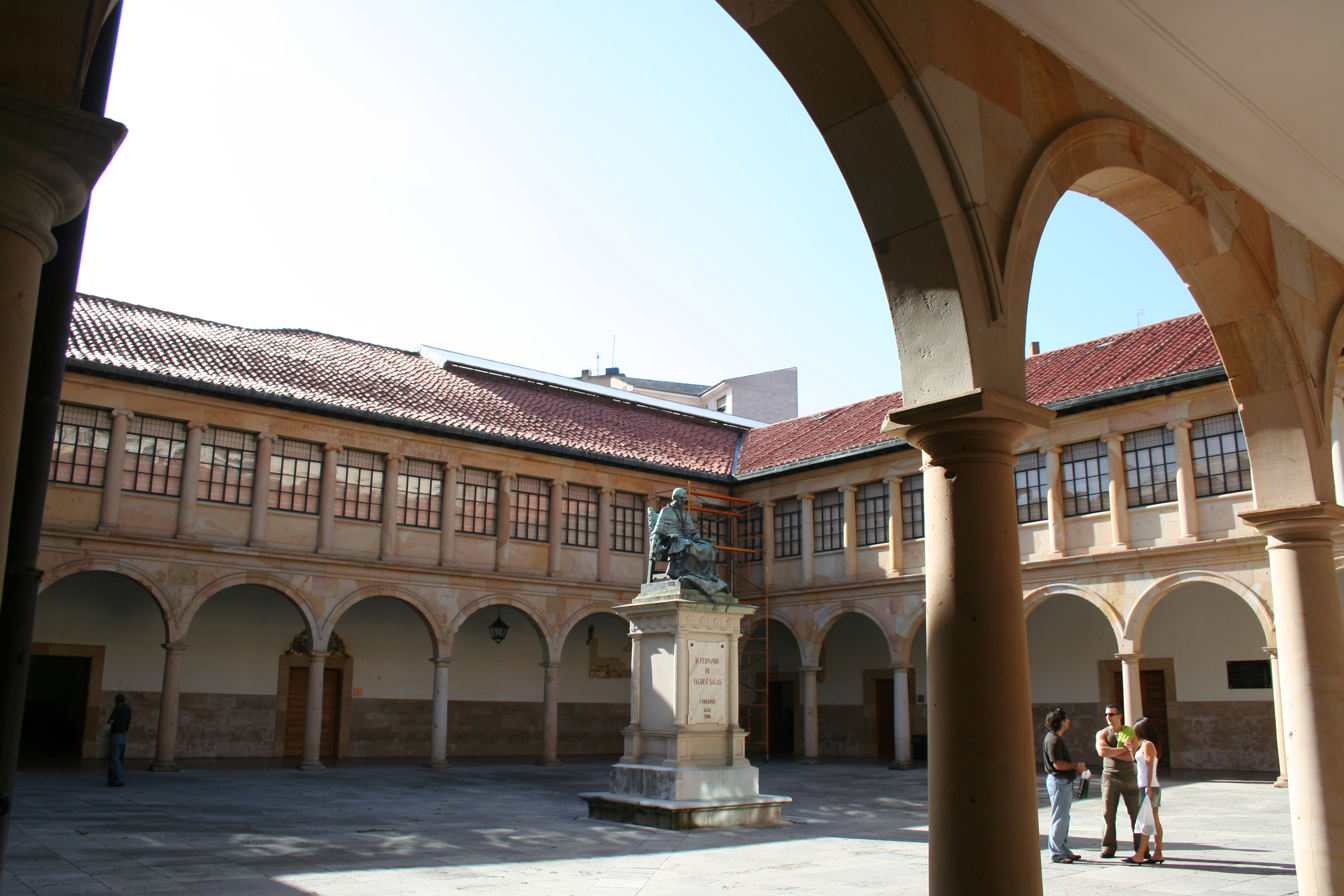
Oviedo University

In 1935 Casariego married María Paz Aguillaume Cadavieco, granddaughter to a Frenchman who in the late 19th century arrived in Asturias building a railway network. His son and Casariego's father-in-law Manuel Aguillaume Valdes held various post office managerial jobs in Asturias; a militant free-thinker, socialist and UGT activist, he was promoted by the Republican administration holding high postal jobs in Oviedo and Toledo, but charged with 13 crimes allegedly committed during the Civil War, he was later trialed and eventually executed during early Francoism. Jesús Evaristo and María Paz settled in Madrid, they had 4 children, all of them daughters: Carmen, María Paz, Margarita and Julia. None of them became a public figure, though three were active in culture contributing to belles-letters, film and historiography.

== Early Carlist militancy ==
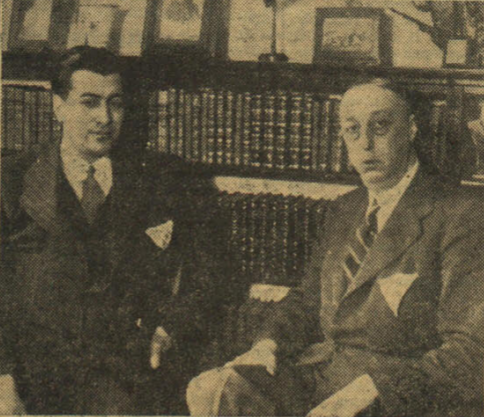
Casariego and Rodezno, 1930s

Casariego was born to family of Carlist heritage. Some of his distant paternal relatives contributed to legitimist press during the Isabelline period, some fought in the First Carlist War; and some in the Third Carlist War. It is not clear what sympathies prevailed among Casariego's parents, as his father is not known for political engagements and his mother came from a militantly Liberal family; however, Casariego credited paternal grandparents for implanting his Traditionalist outlook. It turned out to be more that a juvenile sentiment, as during academic years in the early 1930s he openly declared himself the follower of the Carlist claimant Don Jaime and member of Partido Católico Monárquico. In 1932 he helped to set up the Oviedo branch of Juventud Tradicionalista and engaged in the Madrid section of Juventud Carlista, growing to its vice-president soon. Within the party he made himself known in 1933, when Casariego published a brief treaty on Traditionalist doctrine; it was preceded by a foreword by the Carlist political leader, conde de Rodezno.

Since 1932 Casariego worked for a conservative daily La Nación, running the crónica política column and acting as a correspondent; around the same time he started contributing to the central Madrid Carlist daily El Siglo Futuro, initially as an Oviedo correspondent and since 1936 as member of the editorial board. He covered the Asturian Revolution and recognized as reactionary journalist, in Madrid was subject to violence himself. He was active in Carlist propaganda, e.g. organizing homages to requetés fighting the revolutionaries in Asturias in 1934, though it is not clear whether he engaged in Carlist anti-Republican plots. One source vaguely suggests that Casariego did conspire and another one notes that he was many times detained. Most specific information is that Casariego led some 160 Carlist paramilitary when training warfare near Oviedo, engaged in Sanjurjada and briefly sought refuge in Portugal.

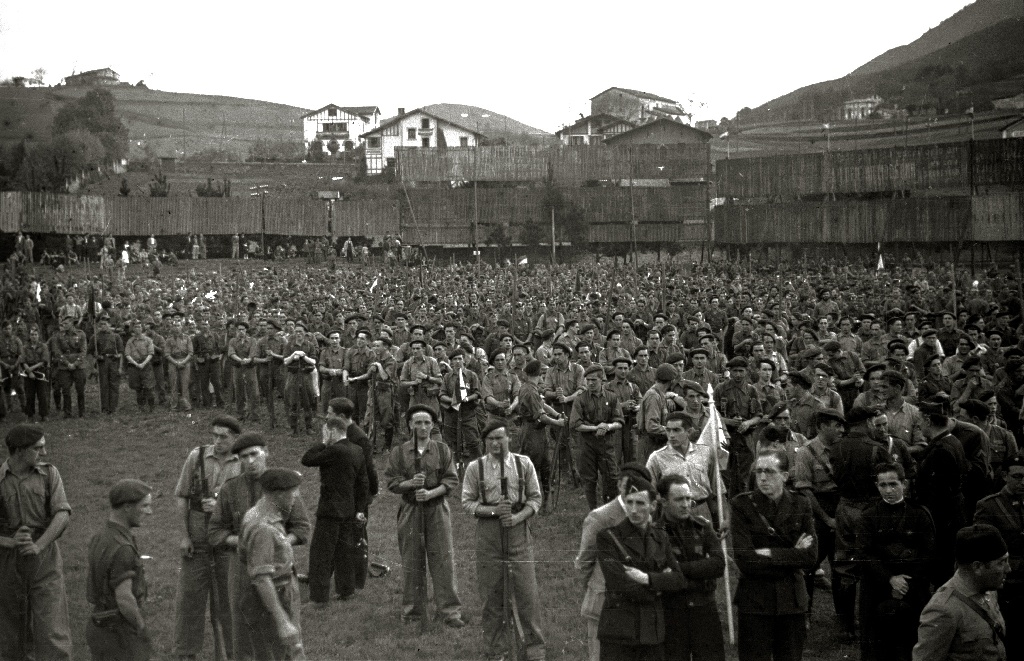
requeté gathering, 1937

The July coup caught Casariego in Asturias, where the family used to spend their summer holidays. He joined the Carlist requeté militiamen engaged in defense of Oviedo, held by the Nationalists but besieged by the Republicans. He was active in combat at least until early 1937. Details are not clear; information provided by Casariego in his later writings is considered confusing by historians. The unit he often referred to, Tercio de Nuestra Señora de Covadonga, is viewed by scholars as sort of a "unidad fantasma", created chiefly by Casariego's literary works. It seems he was either promoted or acted as an officer, his rank given either as teniente or as capitán. According to himself Casariego was heavily wounded when fighting against the Lincoln Brigade. He later probably led a machine-gun company in the Legion, and in early 1939 was noted entering Barcelona with the victorious Nationalist units. It is not known when Casariego ceased to serve under arms, yet no-one has questioned his military merits and some hail his heroic performance. Some sources claim he faked execution of Republican POWs in order to save their lives.

== Early Francoism: El Alcazár ==
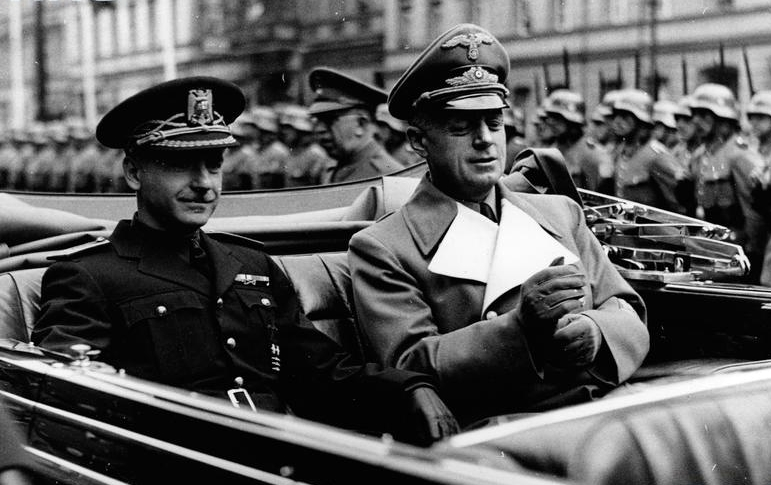
Serrano Suñer in Berlin, 1940

Following the Nationalist victory Casariego returned to Madrid. At that time he already must have had access to at least some individuals forming top layer of Francoist Spain, Ramón Serrano Suñer having been one of them; he launched a bid to restart publishing El Siglo Futuro and La Nación, and possibly to assume management of one of these dailies. Serrano appreciated Casariego's vehement anti-Left militancy yet remained skeptical about his Traditionalist leaning; eventually Casariego was marked as director of El Alcázar, a Toledo-based „diario del frente de Madrid” freshly transferred to Madrid and coveted by two competing organizations. Its original manager was fired at the first opportunity and in October 1939 Casariego assumed directorship of the daily, first temporarily and them permanently. His nomination reflected the Francoist concept of "doctrina de información": parent companies were free to propose managers, but Ministry of Interior was free to reject or confirm them; commercially they were responsible before the board, politically before the state administration.

Casariego's tenure in El Alcazár was marked by permanent conflict with the owners and the board, headed by general Moscardo; it resulted from personal decisions and conflicting managerial visions rather than from political discrepancies, both sides blaming each other for dropping sales and poor commercial performance. In 1942 the conflict escalated to legal denunciations over alleged illegal trading in paper; official investigation strengthened Casariego's position. As press envoy from a neutral country he travelled across the war-torn Europe and interviewed Hitler, Mussolini and Churchill. In terms of political line El Alcazár demonstrated more than zealous loyalty to the new Spain, exalting Franco, Falange and the new Spain in general. However, Casariego did not abandon his earlier ideological leaning: one of key threads which characterized El Alcazár’s profile of the period was "tradicionalismo de raíz carlista", combined with "hispanismo imperialista". He also made sure that these members of El Siglo Futuro staff who survived the war found employment in El Alcazár.

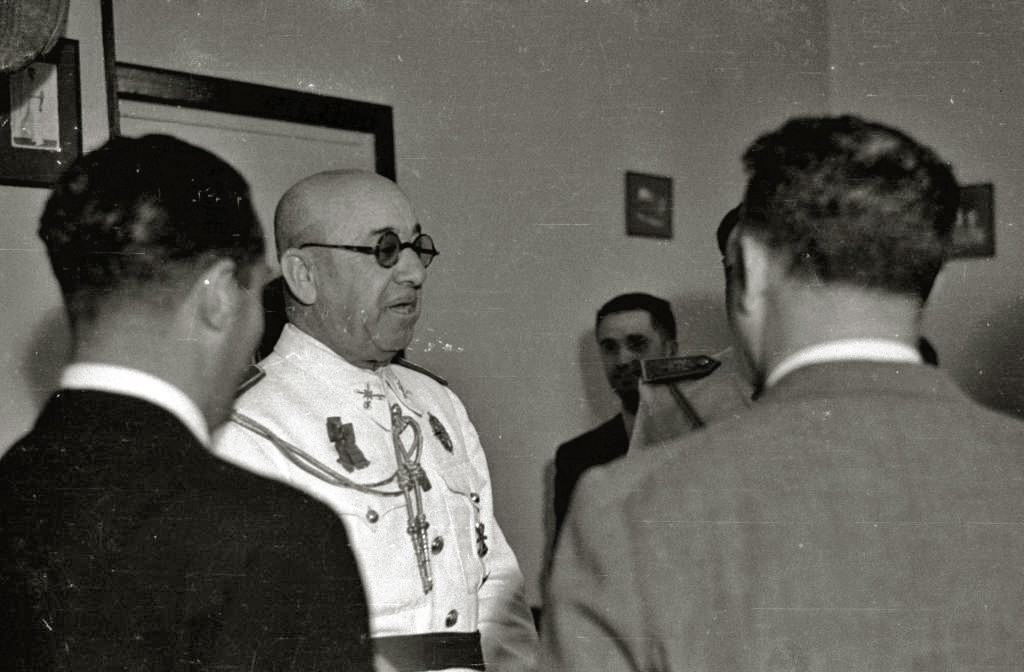
Moscardo, 1940s

One more thread marking El Alcazár was its "militante germanofilia"; according to some sources, the paper was financially supported by the National Socialists. Regardless of his editorial duties, also as a writer Casariego exalted the Germans. His poem Hitler, Mussolini y Franco. Romancillo de los tres Capitanes hailed Nazi Germany as "músculo y motor" which provided a new impulse "desde Flandes a Polonia", and applauded Hitler as Christian crusader against Bolshevism; indeed it seems that the anti-Communist zeal prevailed over pro-German leaning, as during the Hitler-Stalin rapprochement Casariego kept lambasting Moscow as arch-enemy of Europe. What worked to Casariego's advantage changed when pro-Nazi Serrano Suñer was sidetracked and Jordana presided over a new course of the Spanish foreign policy. The new foreign minister demanded that germanophile tones in the Spanish press are de-emphasized; El Alcazár sort of complied, but went on exalting extremely militant anti-Communism, which in turn annoyed Jordana. The board seized the opportunity and in June 1944 Moscardo suggested to Arrese that Casariego should be removed; indeed, few weeks later he left.

== Mid-Francoism: scholar, correspondent, pundit ==
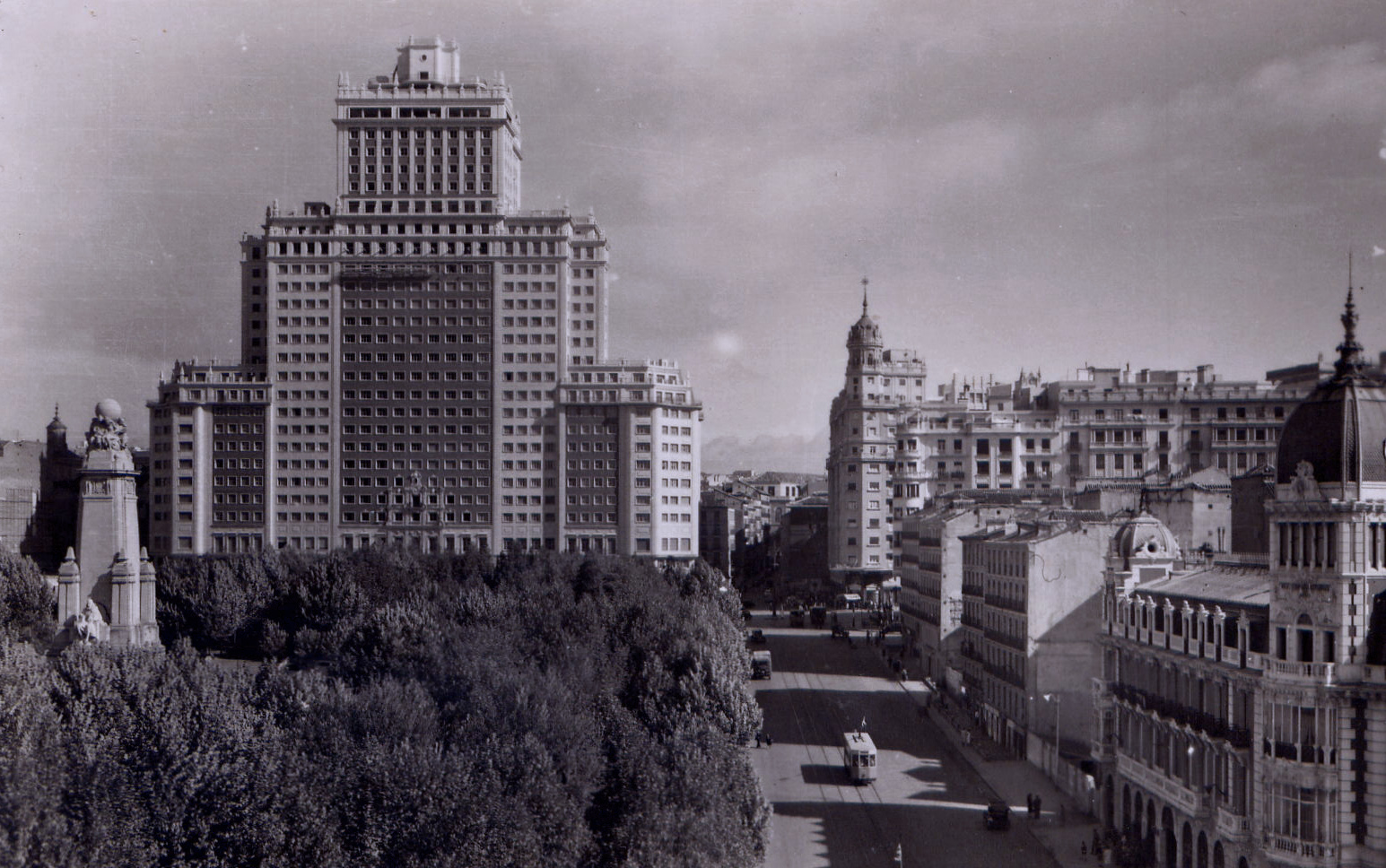
Madrid, 1950s

The ministry-approved Casariego's departure from El Alcazár was not a fall from grace; in some Francoist spheres he remained an appreciated militant camaráda and in 1946 was received at a personal audience by Franco, the privilege granted also in 1948. Already in the early 1940s he commenced an academic career. In 1941 Casariego obtained PhD honors thanks to a dissertation on Spanish imperial legal infrastructure in America, which in turn enabled his assumption of teaching duties at University of Madrid. At the faculties of Law and Political/Economic Sciences he was delivering the course on Historia de las Instituciones Civiles de España en América; it is not clear when his engagement came to an end, yet as late as 1949 he was still recorded as giving lectures at the university. Resident in Madrid, he was noted also as organizing literary tertulias and delivering lectures at Instituto de Cultura Hispanica, Escuela de Periodismo, Centro Asturiano de Madrid and Union Mercantil. At times he contributed also to other Madrid newspapers.

Casariego withdrew from Carlist political militancy. He did not engage in political structures, did not frequent Carlism-flavored events and did not contribute to Carlism-flavored press; historiographic works on Carlism during early and mid-Francoism do not mention him at all. Due to his pro-Francoist zeal demonstrated during the El Alcazár spell many Traditionalists considered him traitor and dubbed him "El Diablo". Some authors suggest that Casariego was left embittered, disappointed and perhaps bewildered, others suggest he withdrew to some sort of political skepticism, "contracorriente de vientos dictatoriales y democráticos". This, however, by no means amounted to opposition or publicly demonstrated discontent; also in the 1950s and 1960s he was a few times admitted by Franco at private audiences. He marginally practiced as a lawyer and was also involved in fishing business in his native Asturias.

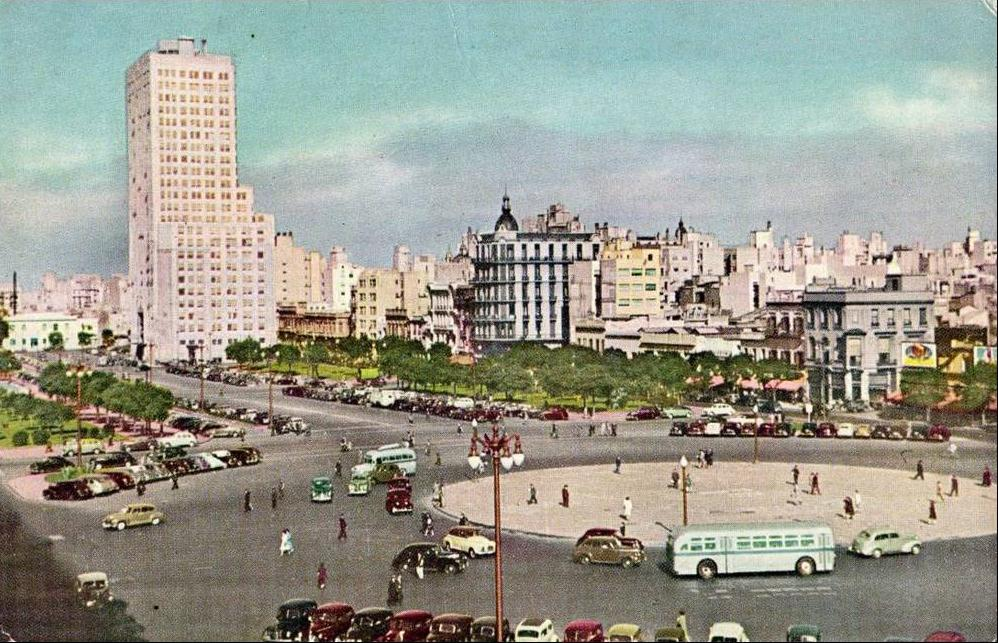
Buenos Aires, 1960s

In the mid-1950s Casariego resumed his press career; as special envoy of ABC he spent the late 1950s and the early 1960s in Latin America, be it Argentina or Cuba, contributing in particular to the ABC companion weekly Blanco y Negro. Upon return to Spain in the mid-1960s Casariego did not return to Madrid but settled in his native Luarca; in its borough of Barcellina he owned a large family house. His interest focused on culture and history, largely formatted as gathering manuscripts, old prints, graphics and other documents. He resumed academic duties, this time in University of Oviedo; already in 1966 he was referred to as "catedratico de historia" and among various courses he managed the role which stands out is this of director del Seminario de Historia Contemporanea de Asturias, performed at least until the early 1970s. He dedicated more and more time to works of the Oviedo-based Instituto de Estudios Asturianos, recognized among chief experts on Asturian history and culture.

== Late Francoism and after: renewed militancy ==
Carlist standard

In 1969 Casariego produced a legal treaty which claimed citizenship rights for the Borbón-Parmas and presented it to the Cortes. No scholar clarifies its origin, especially that Casariego was an unlikely candidate for advocate of a Progressist prince Carlos Hugo. One historian refers a thesis that the initiative was part of a Francoist plot, with Carrero Blanco and CIA money in the background. The initiative bore no fruit, yet Casariego undertook another one: in 1970 he addressed the Carlist Junta Suprema with a widely publicized memorandum. It denounced Left-wing course of the party leadership "camarilla" and dwelled on Traditionalist doctrine. Casariego suggested a grand Carlist assembly to be organized beyond Spain, presided by Don Javier and tasked with setting the political direction. Junta replied that Spain was no longer "a country of illiterate peasants", yet Casariego's letter might have triggered another wave of secessions from the Progressist-dominated movement.

In the early 1970s Casariego joined few isolated initiatives aimed at reinforcing Traditionalist influence within Carlism; he published a booklet, contributed to El Pensamiento Navarro, signed few open letters and planned launch of a Traditionalist periodical. All these bids bore no fruit and at the moment of Franco's death Casariego was among a group of Carlist orthodoxes left out in the cold by the Left-wing Partido Carlista. Following some hesitation related to recognition of Juan Carlos in the mid-1970s Casariego was among founders of Comunión Tradicionalista, one of few attempts to re-institutionalize orthodox Carlism. As its delegate he ran for Senate from the Alianza Nacional 18 de Julio list in the 1977 elections, yet his Oviedo bid proved unsuccessful; in the 1978 by-elections he was standing as the CT candidate and lost decisively. Despite these defeats at times he assumed high profile as leader of far-Right groupings; during the nationwide rally against the constitution draft, the gathering which amassed hundreds of thousands of people on the Madrid Plaza de Oriente in November 1978, Casariego was among the key speakers. The event marked the climax but also the end of his political career; except interventions in few rallies of 1979 he withdrew from politics.

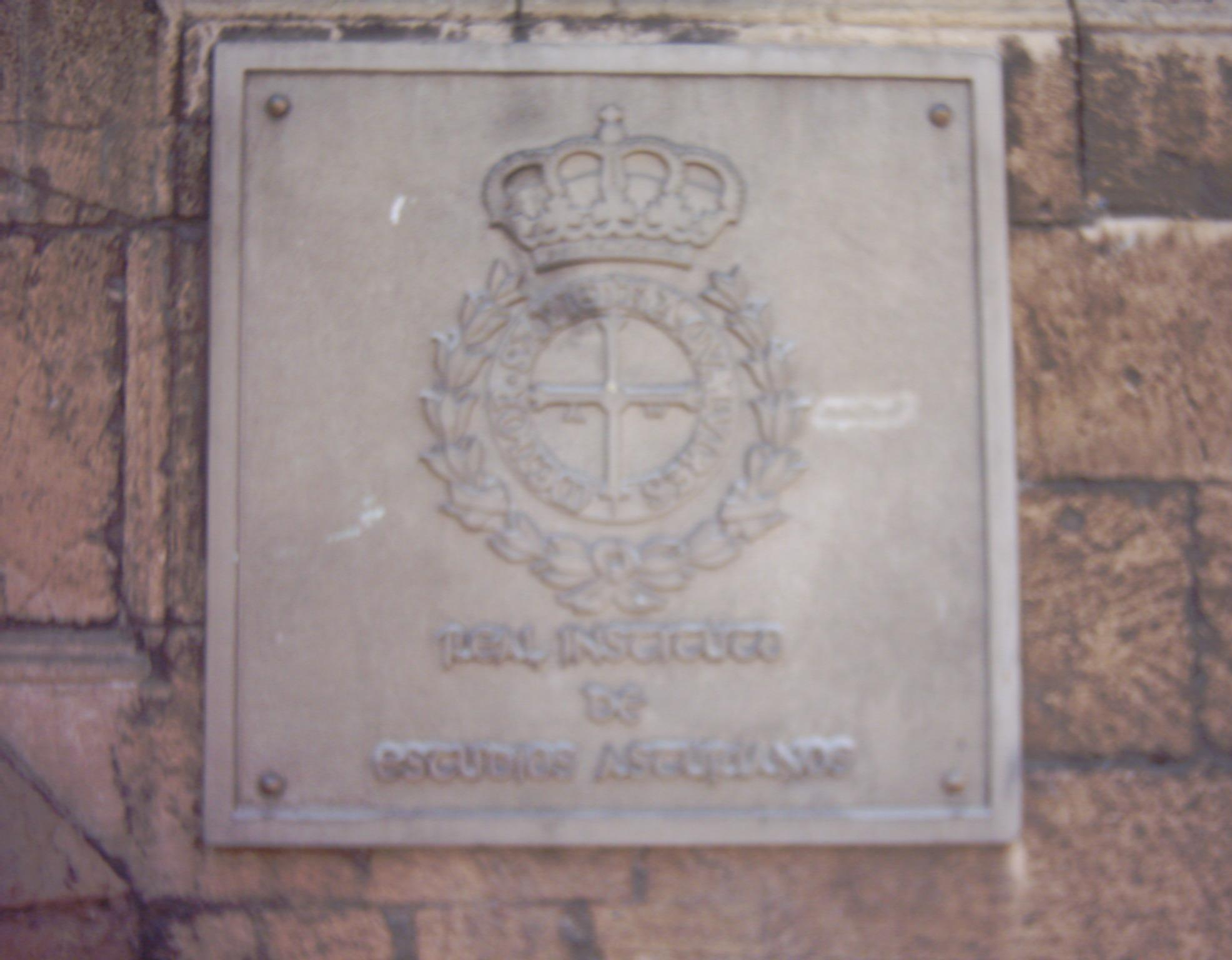
plaque at IDEA headquarters

For decade engaged in Institute of Asturian Studies, by some considered ideological outpost of Francoism in Asturias, in 1978 Casariego was the first elected director of IDEA; he held the job for the next 12 years. His public engagements of the 1980s are almost exclusively related to Asturian issues, he also kept contributing to the IDEA bulletin. He paid special attention to bable, promoted it and found himself among co-founders of Amigos de los Bables, though he also opposed institutionalization and codification of the language. As late as 1989 he appeared as prestigious expert during local events, delivering lectures in the Oviedo ayuntamiento and addressing the audience which included top local officials. Despite public recognition and grand house in Barcellina his financial status was shaky and some claim he died "in austerity"; when admitted to the hospital it turned out he had no social insurance.

== Writer ==
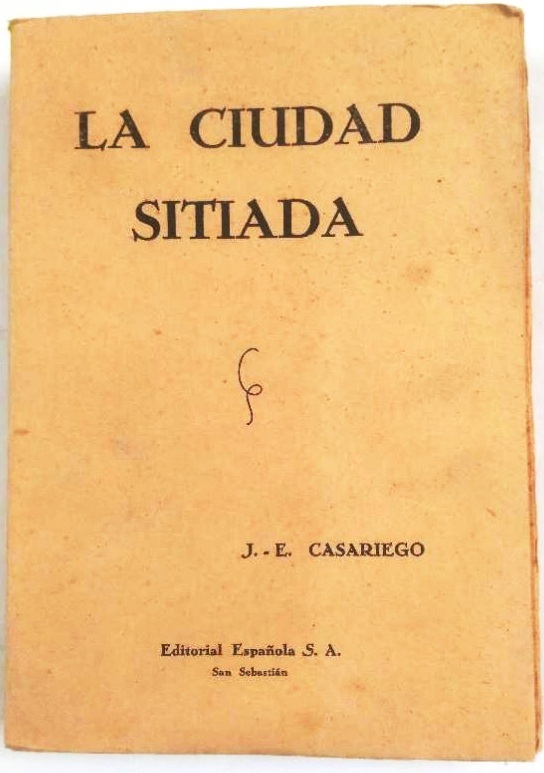

His contemporaries knew Casariego mostly as a novelist. Flor de hidalgos (1938), La ciudad sitiada (1939) and the best-known Con la vida hicieron fuego (1953) are set during the Civil War; the first two provide accounts of Carlists requetés fighting the Republicans, the last novel remained within the same genre, but assumed a somewhat melancholic tone. El mayorazgo navegante (1944) was an adventure story in a historical setting. Far less popular was Casariego's poetry: Romances modernos de toros, guerra y caza (1945), Romancillos de la fregata y de la diligencia (1951), Mares y veleros de España (1953), La historia triste de Fernando y Belisa (1960), Los cantos del bosque (1973) and Cantos de las soledades (1976).

Most Casariego's books fall into historiography. His interest was very much in grandeur of Hispanidad; key works in the area are essays grouped in Grandeza y proyección del mundo hispánico (1941) and Exaltación y estirpe de las cosas de España (1944), plus more systematic studies El municipio y las cortes en el imperio español de Indias (1943), Jovellanos o el equilibrio (1944), Historia del derecho y de las instituciones marítimas del mundo hispánico (1947) and El marqués de Sargadelos (1976), apart from a number of minor works.

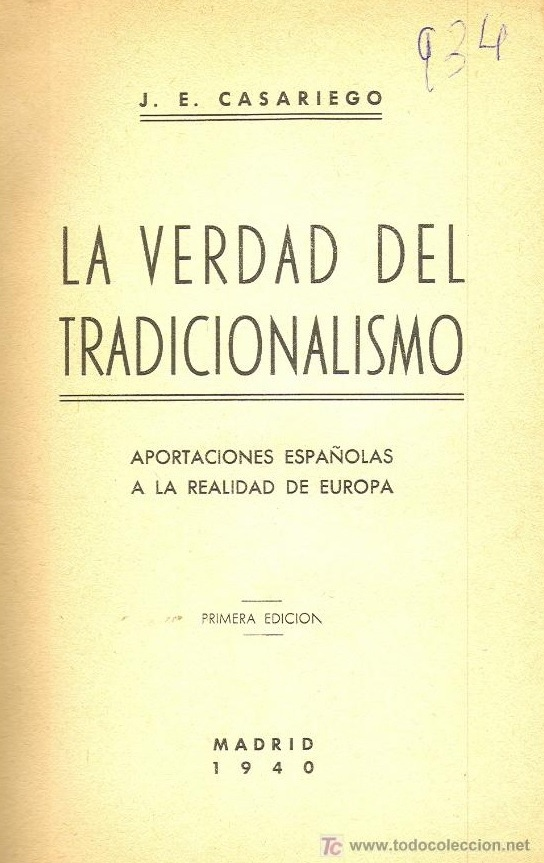

In the last three decades of his life Casariego focused on history and culture of Asturias. Among some 15 works on the subject the one which stands out is Historias asturianas de hace más de mil años (1983), followed by Las Asturias guerrera (1976), Caminos y viajeros de Asturias (1979) and Oviedo en la historia y la literatura a través de 1200 años (1987); the rest are minor booklets. Casariego investigated also some specific topics. His interest in maritime history was best expressed in Los orígenes del Derecho Marítimo (1947) and Los grandes periplos de la antigüedad (1949), accompanied by a translation from Greek and other works. Interest in history of arms and hunting was pursued in perhaps the best Casariego's historiographic studies, Tratado histórico de las armas (1962), Tratado de montería y caza menuda (1976), Caza en el arte español (1982) and Armas de España (1984).

The least-known Casariego's works are related to politics. Some are general militant propaganda pamphlets: España ante la guerra del mundo and ¡Guerra en Finlandia! La Unión Sovietica contra Europa (both 1940), ¡Alerta Europa! Un llamamiento a la conciencia de los europeos no rojos (1943) and somewhat more analytical La generación de 1936 y sus problemas (1954) and La unidad de España y los mitos del separatismo vasco (1980). Some are treaties on history and theory of Carlism: El Tradicionalismo como doctrina del derecho político (1933), Para la historia del Carlismo (1939), Carlismo y Facismo, La verdad del Tradicionalismo: aportaciones españoles a la realidad de Europa (both 1940), Historia militar y política de Zumalacárregui (1941) and Lo que es hoy un carlismo (1970).

== Reception and legacy ==
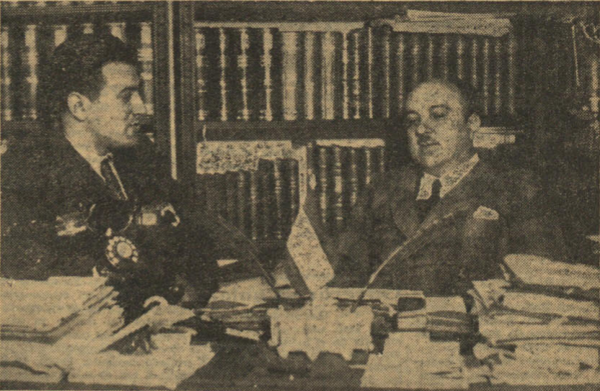
interviewing Albiñana, 1936

Before the Civil War Casariego was known only to readers of La Nacíon and to a few Carlists; until the mid-1940s he gained some recognition due to El Alcazár assignment and the first two novels. It was Con la vida hicieron fuego which in the mid-1950s earned him the nationally recognized status. Popular among both readers and critics, the book was dubbed "novela de una generación" and applauded by intellectuals like Marañon; many appreciated its Galdosian breadth. The novel also served as basis for a 1956 movie, yet the cinematographic work traded the original melancholy for "exaltación oficialista" and was not a success. The late 1950s marked the climax of Casariego's popularity; though he kept writing his later volumes were addressed to limited audience interested in specific topics, like hunting, maritime history, Carlism and the culture of Asturias. Only in his native region he gained monumental status, in the 1970s recognized as an expert on Asturian past but also as sort of a living relic, "un gran tipo", picturesque icon, "man living in the 18th century" and a protagonist of countless anecdotes. He was named Hijo Adoptivo by Luarca and Hijo Predilecto by Tineo and in 1983 earned a commemorative booklet.

The writings of Casariego did not stand the test of time. As a novelist he is absent in general works on 20th-century Spanish prose, reduced to short passages in accounts on "literatura fascista" or civil war novel. His books are usually presented as slightly more than propaganda. With political apologetics, lively yet simple plot, nagging moralizing objectives and anachronistic message, they are counted within "corriente martirológico-heroica" and denied major value. Even more damning are scholars who focus on pro-Nazi threads in Casariego's writings; they quote poems which exalted Hitler and his crusade against Soviet bolshevism or British plutocracy and note that as late as 1953 protagonists of his novels identified with Fascism. There are also competitive views, though. Apart from apparently ideologically-grounded references to "outstanding writer", also by foreign authors, some students note that especially Con la vida was grounded in philosophical concepts, protagonists remained complex figures in dialectic relationship with environment and the message was far from unambiguous proselytizing. Nazi threads are presented as Casariego's protest against hypocrisy, which turned Wehrmacht generals who invaded Poland into criminals and Soviet generals who invaded Poland into prosecutors.

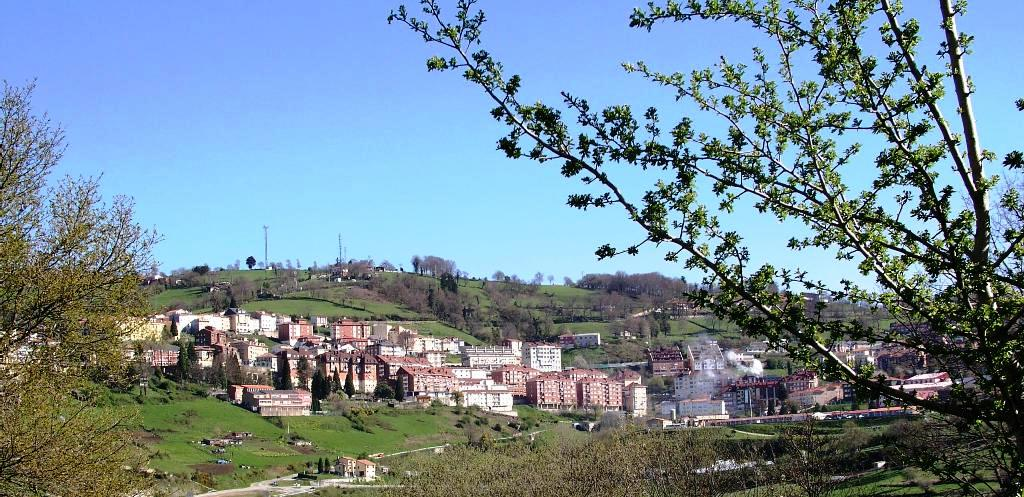
Tineo. "Travesia Jesús Evaristo Casariago" is the road running through lower part of the photo

Casariego historiographic works went into almost total oblivion, though they are at times quoted by historians of Carlism, Asturias, hunting or navigation. His best-known contribution is actually an erroneous concept on Marx and Carlism, which entered wide circulation and which needed decades to get corrected. Among the Traditionalists Casariego is considered a valiant soldier, talented writer and recently also a theorist, counted among "maestros del tradicionalismo hispanico de la segunda mitad del siglo XX". There is a street named after Casariego in Tineo and some local prints name him "tinetense universal". His massive collection was largely lost in chaos following his death; his house in Barcellina was until recently in decay approaching a ruin.

== See also ==
- El Alcázar
- Traditionalism (Spain)
- Carlism
- Carlo-francoism
- Carlism in literature
