= The Island of Contenda =

1995 film by Leão Lopes

- Directed by: Leão Lopes
- Written by: Henrique Teixeira de Sousa; José Fanha; Leão Lopes
- Produced by: Paulo de Sousa
- Starring: João Lourenço; Camacho Costa; Luísa Cruz
- Edited by: Denise Vindevogel
- Music by: Manuel Paulo Felgueiras
- Production companies: Vermédia; RTP; MBSA; Saga Film; Instituto Cabo-verdiano de Cinema
- Distributed by: Marfilmes
- Release date: 1995
- Running time: 110 minutes
- Country: Cape Verde
- Language: Portuguese

The Island of Contenda (original title: O Ilhéu de Contenda) is a 1995 drama film directed by Leão Lopes.

== Synopsis ==
Cape Verde, 1964. At the feet of a mighty volcano, the traditional Cape Verdean society is undergoing a steady change. The old land-owning aristocracy is disintegrating. A class of mulatto begins to emerge, with a trade-based financial power that threatens the landlords. A new identity arises, a mix of old and new, of African and Portuguese culture, sensual and dynamic.

The songs of Cesária Évora follow this inevitable transformation with the beautiful landscape of Fogo, Cape Verde, as scenery.

The Island of Contenda was the first feature film to be produced with the financial support of the Cape Verde national film institute (Instituto Cabo-verdiano de Cinema) that no longer exists.

It is adapted from the novel by Henrique Teixeira de Sousa.

== Cast ==
- João Lourenço – Eusébio
- Camacho Costa – Felisberto
- Luísa Cruz – Esmeralda
- Filipe Ferrer – Alberto
- Betina Lopes – Soila
- Cecília Guimarães – Nha Noca
- Marina Albuquerque
- Henrique Espírito Santo – Governor
- José Fanha – Carneiro
- Laurinda Ferreira – Alice
- Leandro Ferreira – Father Vitório
- Isabel de Castro – Nha Caela
- Teresa Madruga – Beliha
- Luís Mascarenhas – Inspector
- Mano Preto – Chiquinho
- Carlos Rodrigues – Augusto Foleiro
- Horácio Santos – Anacleto
- Diogo Vasconcelos
- Pedro Wilson – Dr. Vicente

== Release ==
The film was released in 1996 in Cape Verde

== Festivals ==
- Cabo Verde International Film Festival
- Milan Film Festival, Italy (1997)
- Amiens International Film Festival, November 10, 1997

== Awards ==
- Best Original Score at FESPACO – Panafrican Film and Television Festival of Ouagadougou, Burkina Faso (1997)
- First Prize at Festival de Cine Internacional de Ourense, Spain (1997)

== See also ==
- Leão Lopes
- Cinema of Cape Verde
