= Ana Mariscal =

Spanish actress, director, screenwriter, and producer (1923–1995)

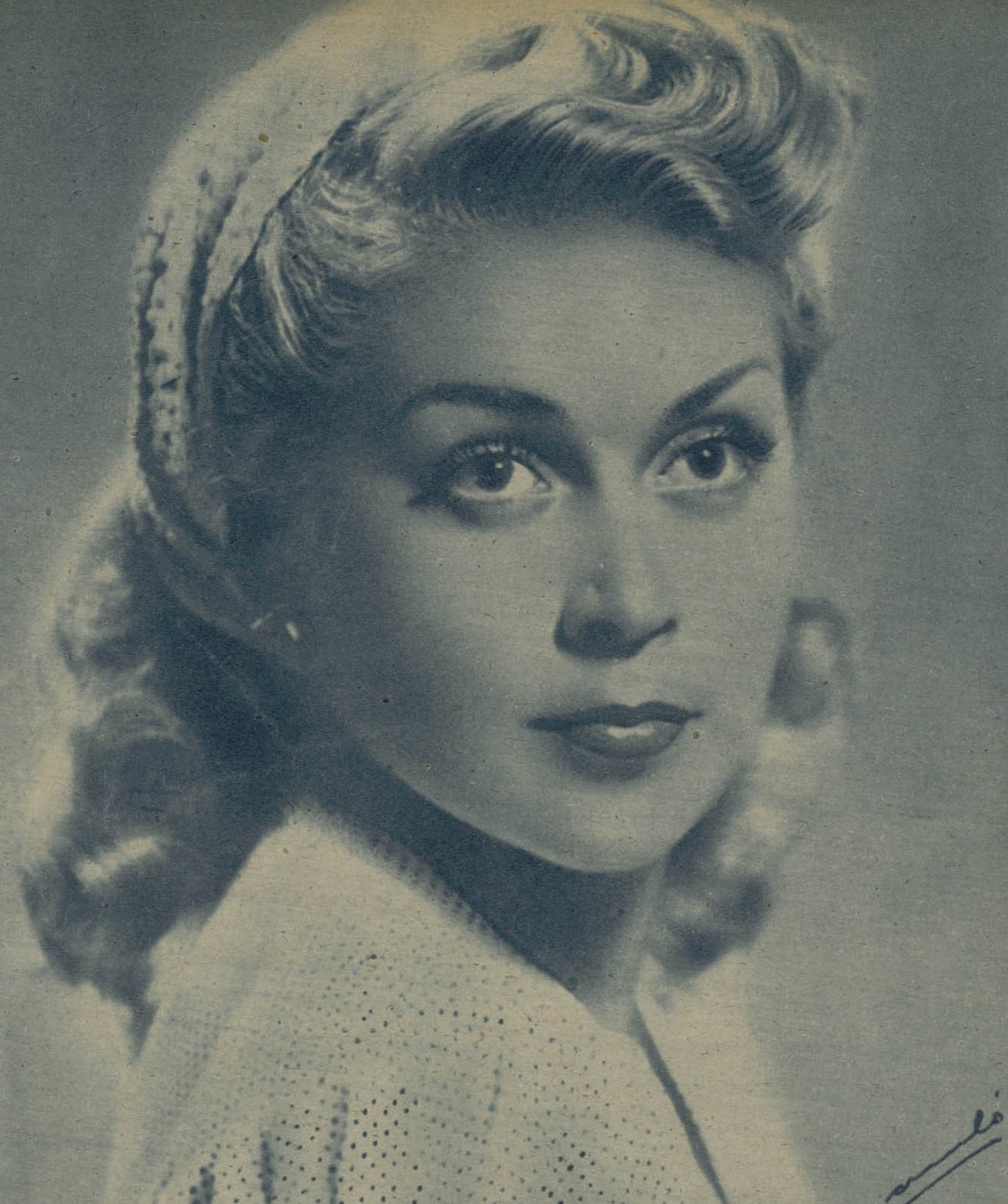
- Mariscal in 1944
- Born: Ana María Arroyo Mariscal; July 31, 1923; Madrid, Spain
- Died: March 28, 1995 (aged 71); Madrid, Spain
- Years active: 1940–1968
- Spouse: Valentín Javier García-Fernández (m.1954)

Ana María Arroyo Mariscal (31 July 1923 – 28 March 1995) better known as Ana Mariscal was a classic Spanish film actress, director, screenwriter and film producer. Mariscal worked in well over 50 films between 1940 and 1968, often starring in films she also wrote and directed. She is iconic in 1940s and 1950s Spanish cinema. She also acted in Argentinean films. Her brother Luis Arroyo (1915–1956) was also an actor and film director.

== Early life and education ==
Mariscal was born in Madrid in 1923 to a middle-class family. Her father owned a furniture store and a theater that would provide Mariscal much of her early exposure to acting. While occasionally appearing in theater productions with her brother, Mariscal intended to go to university to study mathematics. In 1936 she performed in a revival of El Trovador by the amateur theater group Anfistora, directed by Pura Maortua de Ucelay. She decided to pursue acting after being incidentally cast in her first film role.

== Career ==
Ana Mariscal began her career after accompanying her actor brother Luis Arroyo to an audition for El Ultimo Husar. Almost by chance, she was noticed by the director Luis Marquina and cast in the film. This would start a prolific career in acting and directing.

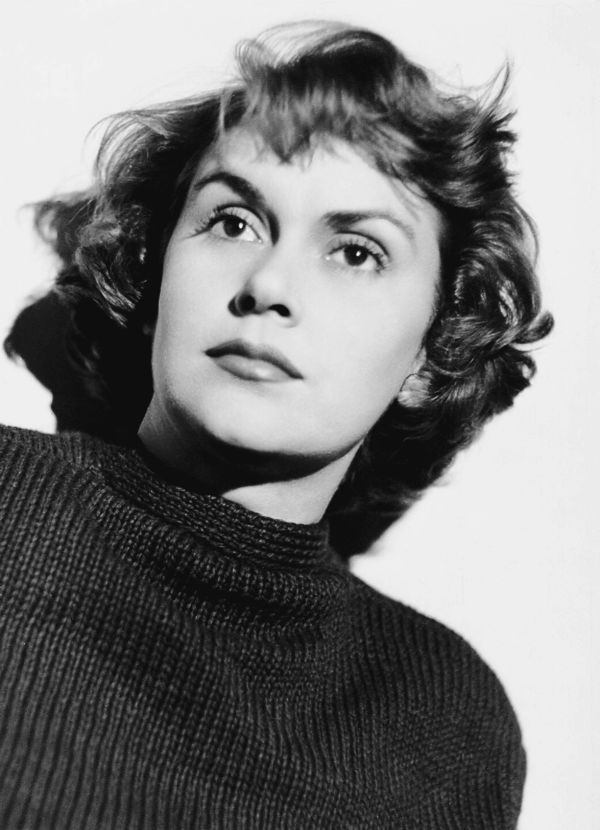
Ana Mariscal, 1952

Over the next decade, Mariscal starred in over 20 films, becoming a household name in Spain. A few notable films from this time include The Queen's Flower Girl, Raza, A Shadow at the Window, and The Princess of the Ursines. After a decade of typecast roles, Mariscal started her own production company called BOSCO and begin writing and directing her own works. She made her directorial debut with Segundo Lopez, a film she also wrote and starred in. It was a critically well-received comedy with Italian Neo-realist influences. She later directed her esteemed work They fired with their lives that deals with the Spanish Civil War; an event Mariscal herself lived through during her childhood.

In her later career, she shifted among film, television, and theater pursuits, still using her production company to fund her projects. During this period, she directed or became involved with Occidente y sabotaje, El Camino, and The Other Woman. She began teaching classes at the IIEC (Institute of Investigations and Cinematographic Experiences) while still balancing acting and directing jobs. She eventually receded from the world of film making and dedicate her time entirely to the study of literature.

Just a few months before her death, she received the gold medal for Merit in the Fine Arts in 1995.

== Filmography ==
Year	Film	Actress	Director	Producer	Writer
1940	El último húsar	Yes	No	No	No
1940	Amore di ussaro	Yes	No	No	No
1940	The Queen's Flower Girl	Yes	No	No	No
1942	Raza	Yes	No	No	No
1942	¡Qué contenta estoy!	Yes	No	No	No
1942	Siempre mujeres	Yes	No	No	No
1942	Vidas cruzadas	Yes	No	No	No
1943	Cuarenta y ocho horas	Yes	No	No	No
1944	Cabeza de hierro	Yes	No	No	No
1945	A Shadow at the Window	Yes	No	No	No
1945	¡Culpable!	Yes	No	No	No
1945	Viento de siglos	Yes	No	No	No
1945	El obstáculo	Yes	No	No	No
1947	Dulcinea	Yes	No	No	No
1947	Noche sin cielo	Yes	No	No	No
1947	The Princess of the Ursines	Yes	No	No	No
1948	The Drummer of Bruch	Yes	No	No	No
1948	Amanhã Como Hoje	Yes	No	No	No
1948	La próxima vez que vivamos	Yes	No	No	No
1948	La vida encadenada	Yes	No	No	No
1949	Aquellas palabras	Yes	No	No	No
1949	Pacto de silencio	Yes	No	No	No
1949	Doce horas de vida	Yes	No	No	No
1949	A Man on the Road	Yes	No	No	No
1950	Woman to Woman	Yes	No	No	No
1950	La fuente enterrada	Yes	No	No	No
1951	The Great Galeoto	Yes	No	No	No
1953	Segundo López, aventurero urbano	Yes	Yes	Yes	Yes
1953	Jeromín	Yes	No	No	No
1953	Vértigo	Yes	No	No	No
1954	Morena Clara	Yes	No	No	No
1954	En carne viva	Yes	No	No	No
1955	Un día perdido	Yes	No	No	No
1955	Baccara	Yes	No	No	No
1955	De noche también se duerme	Yes	No	No	No
1956	Los maridos de mamá	Yes	No	No	No
1956	Enigma de mujer	Yes	No	No	No
1958	The Violet Seller	Yes	No	No	No
1958	Hay que bañar al nene	Yes	No	No	No
1958	Patio andaluz	Yes	No	No	No
1958	Carlota	Yes	No	No	No
1959	Juego de niños	Yes	No	Yes	No
1959	They Fired with Their Lives	Yes	Yes	Yes	Yes
1959	The Magistrate	Yes	No	No	No
1960	The Football Lottery	Yes	Yes	No	No
1961	Hola, muchacho	Yes	Yes	No	No
1962	Feria en Sevilla	Yes	Yes	No	No
1962	Queen of the Chantecler	Yes	No	No	No
1962	Occidente y sabotaje	Yes	Yes	No	Yes
1963	El Camino	No	Yes	Yes	Yes
1964	The Other Woman	Yes	No	No	No
1966	Los duendes de Andalucia	No	Yes	Yes	Yes
1966	Vestida de novia	Yes	Yes	No	No
1968	El paseíllo	Yes	Yes	No	Yes
1987	El polizón del Ulises	Yes	No	No	No

== Awards ==
Year	Award	Category	Film
1945	CEC Medal	Best Leading Actress	A Shadow at the Window
1949	CEC Medal	Best Leading Actress	A Man on the Road
1950	CEC Medal	Best Leading Actress	Woman to Woman
1994	Gold Medal for Merits in Fine Arts	N/A	N/A
