= A Shadow at the Window =

1944 film

- Directed by: Ignacio F. Iquino
- Written by: Cecilio Benítez de Castro (novel); Ignacio F. Iquino
- Starring: Manuel Luna; Ana Mariscal; María Martín; Adriano Rimoldi
- Cinematography: Sebastián Perera
- Music by: Ramón Ferrés
- Production company: Emisora Films
- Release date: 1944
- Running time: 77 minutes
- Country: Spain
- Language: Spanish

A Shadow at the Window (Spanish: Una sombra en la ventana) is a 1944 Spanish crime film directed by Ignacio F. Iquino and starring Manuel Luna, Ana Mariscal and María Martín. It was based on a novel by Cecilio Benítez de Castro.

== Cast ==
- Teresa Idel
- Manuel Luna
- Ana Mariscal
- María Martín
- Francisco Melgares
- Adriano Rimoldi
- Jesús Tordesillas

== Bibliography ==
- Bentley, Bernard. A Companion to Spanish Cinema. Boydell & Brewer 2008.
