= The Pelegrín System =

- Directed by: Ignacio F. Iquino
- Written by: Wenceslao Fernández Flórez (novel)
- Produced by: José Carreras Planas; Carlos Grande; Ignacio F. Iquino
- Starring: Fernando Fernán Gómez; Isabel de Castro; Sergio Orta
- Cinematography: Pablo Ripoll
- Edited by: Juan Pallejá
- Music by: Augusto Algueró
- Production company: IFI Producción
- Distributed by: IFISA
- Release date: 23 June 1952
- Running time: 96 minutes
- Country: Spain
- Language: Spanish

The Pelegrín System (Spanish: El sistema Pelegrín) is a 1952 Spanish sports comedy film directed by Ignacio F. Iquino and starring Fernando Fernán Gómez, Isabel de Castro and Sergio Orta.

== Cast ==
- Fernando Fernán Gómez as Héctor Pelegrín
- Isabel de Castro as Luisa
- Sergio Orta as Don Carlos Martínez
- Manuel Monroy as Moscoso
- Luis Pérez de León as Ferrán
- Rafael Luis Calvo as Bremón (padre)
- Ramón Giner as Gómez
- José Calvo as Padre de Gelasio
- Gerardo Esteban as Locutor
- Carmen Valenzuela as Madre de Gelasio
- Federico Górriz
- Augusto Ordóñez as Padre de Jeromín
- Ricardo Valor
- María Zaldívar as Madre de Rosita
- Mario Bustos as Sr. Pons
- Isabel Estorch as Rosita
- Carmen Valor
- Matías Ferret as Alcalde
- Jaime Planas

== Bibliography ==
- Bentley, Bernard. A Companion to Spanish Cinema. Boydell & Brewer 2008.
