= Leão Lopes =

Cape Verdean director, writer, plastic artist and professor

- Born: 1948; Ribeira Grande, Santo Antão, Cape Verde
- Occupation(s): director, writer, plastic artist, professor

Leão Lopes (born 1948 in Ribeira Grande, Santo Antão, Cape Verde) is a Cape Verdean director, writer, plastic artist and professor.

As a filmmaker, he made the first ever feature of Cape Verdean fiction, The Island of Contenda (1996), based on a novel by Henrique Teixeira de Sousa. He is also author of various documentary including Bitú (2009) which was about the Mindelo native artist filmed in 2006, and São Tomé - Os Últimos Contratados (2010).

In 1979, he founded AtelierMar in Mindelo, a non-government organization, dedicated to formation of a cultural capacity and local development in which still presides.

He was Minister of Culture and Communications during the Carlos Veiga legislature between 1991 and 2000, he is currently deputy member at the Cape Verdean National Assembly and elected as MpD party.

He founded the University Institute of Arts, Technological and Culture (M_EIA) in Mindelo and is currently dean and professor.

== Academic career ==
After finishing his secondary studies in Cape Verde, Leão Lopes headed to Lisbon and was graduated in painting at the Lisbon High School of Fine Arts (Escola Superior de Belas-Artes de Lisboa). In France, he was a doctorate at University of Rennes II with a thesis about the Cape Verdean writer Baltasar Lopes.

Currently he is a rector at M_EIA with teaching in various disciplines, even post-graduation in film and audiovisual.

== Visual arts ==
His visual artistry is an expression of Cape Verdean experiences, mainly in his native island. Leão Lopes even rejects the labels of different areas of the part. In an interview by the reviewer NosGenti: Never worn the clothing of a writer of a plastic artist. I approaches art, not as plural, but only and exclusively singular. The supports which largely allows to express, regardless of an area, are the ones who elect at the time..

== Filmography ==
=== Feature film ===
- The Island of Contenda (1995)

=== Documentaries ===
- O Últimos Contratados (The Last Contracts) (2009)
- Bitú (2010)

== Published works ==
- Unine, 1998, short storiey
- O contexto jurídico dos media em Cabo Verde (Judicial Context of Cape Verdean Media), 1998, essay
- Baltasar Lopes: 1907-1989, 2002, doctoral dissertation
- Capitão Farel: A Fabulosa História do Capitão Farewell, o Pirata de Monte Joana (Captain Farel: The Fabulous History of Captain Farewell, the Pirate of Mount Joanne), 2009, children's story
- Baltasar Lopes: um homem arquipélago na linha de todas as batalhas (Baltasar Lopes; A Man of the Archipelago in the Line of All Battles), 2011, essay

=== Collaborations ===
- Santo Antão: alguns olhares, 1984
- A partilha do indivisível: imagens dos objectivos do Milénio, 2006
- Ejercicios poéticos: Exercícios poéticos (Poetic Exercises), 2010
- A História de Blimundo, Dima, o passarinho que criou o mundo: mitos, contos e lendas dos países de língua portuguesa, 2013, short story
