= África (film) =

- Theatrical release poster
- Directed by: Alfonso Ungría
- Screenplay by: Alfonso Ungría
- Story by: Alfonso Ungría; Joaquín Oristrell
- Starring: Imanol Arias; Julie Carmen; Zoe Berriatúa; Elena Anaya
- Cinematography: Hans Burmann
- Music by: Suso Saiz
- Production companies: Sogetel; Bocaboca Producciones
- Distributed by: Columbia TriStar Films de España
- Release date: 17 May 1996
- Country: Spain
- Language: Spanish

África is a 1996 Spanish drama film directed by Alfonso Ungría which stars Zoe Berriatúa, Elena Anaya, Imanol Arias, and Julie Carmen.

== Plot ==
Set in the working-class district of San Blas, the plot follows Martín (an admirer of runner Abebe Bikila) and his fraught and oedipical relation with his father Arturo, as well as his budding romantic relationship with África, a young girl the same age as him, who works in a bar with her mother Isabel.

== Cast ==
- Zoe Berriatúa as Martín
- Elena Anaya as África
- Julie Carmen as Isabel
- Imanol Arias as Arturo

== Production ==
The screenplay was based on a story by Ungría and Joaquín Oristrell. The film is a Sogetel and Bocaboca Producciones production. It boasted a budget of around 160 million ₧. It was shot on location in San Blas.

== Release ==
The film was theatrically released in Spain on 17 May 1996.

== Reception ==
Augusto Martínez Torres of El País considered that Alfonso Ungría "not only manages to provide a solid dramatic structure to his story, but also proves to be a great actor's director".

In the view of Josep Torrell, as featured in his chronicle "El cine español de 1996", the film is "imperfect", "laconic and honest", featuring a "splendid photography by Hans Burmann".

== See also ==
- List of Spanish films of 1996
