= Under the Skies of the Asturias =

- Directed by: Gonzalo Delgrás
- Written by: Armando Palacio Valdés (novel); Manuel Bengoa; Margarita Robles
- Cinematography: Pablo Ripoll
- Edited by: Ramon Quadreny
- Music by: Josep Maria Torrens
- Production company: Producciones Iquino
- Distributed by: IFISA
- Release date: 30 July 1951
- Running time: 79 minutes
- Country: Spain
- Language: Spanish

Under the Skies of the Asturias (Spanish: Bajo el cielo de Asturias) is a 1951 Spanish drama film directed by Gonzalo Delgrás and starring Isabel de Castro, Augusto Ordóñez and Luis Pérez de León.

== Cast ==
- Isabel de Castro as Angelina Quirós
- Augusto Ordóñez as A. Quirós / J. Quirós
- Luis Pérez de León as Padre Tiburcio
- José Luis González as Foro
- Alfonso Estela as G. Manrique
- Soledad Lence as Carmina
- Carlos Otero as Federico
- Ramón Giner as Pepín
- María Zaldívar as Griselda
- Vicente Miranda as Pepón
- Rosario Vallín as Sinfo
- Luis Villasiul as Fray Ceferino
- Matías Ferret as Vigil
- Manuel Santullano as Román
- Silvia Morgan as Felisa
- Carlo Tamberlani as Fray Atanasio

== Bibliography ==
- Crusells, Magi. Directores de cine en Cataluña: de la A a la Z. Edicions Universitat Barcelona, 2009.
