= The Dance of the Heart =

1953 film

- Directed by: Raúl Alfonso; Ignacio F. Iquino
- Written by: Antonio Fraguas; José Francés (novel); Ignacio F. Iquino; Juan Lladó
- Produced by: Aureliano Campa
- Starring: Tony Leblanc; Isabel de Castro; Manuel Monroy
- Cinematography: Pablo Ripoll
- Edited by: Ramon Quadreny
- Music by: Augusto Algueró
- Production company: IFI Producción
- Distributed by: IFISA
- Release date: 2 March 1953
- Running time: 75 minutes
- Country: Spain
- Language: Spanish

The Dance of the Heart (Spanish: La danza del corazón) is a 1953 Spanish musical film directed by Raúl Alfonso and Ignacio F. Iquino and starring Tony Leblanc, Isabel de Castro and Manuel Monroy. It was made by the Barcelona-based company IFI Producción.

== Synopsis ==
Elena falls in love with the director of a zarzuela company as she passes through a Spanish capital. She leaves with him, but her father will oppose this relationship. Her remorse for having disobeyed her father and having left him alone does not go away, to the point of reaching the breaking point.

== Cast ==
- Tony Leblanc as Luis Calzada
- Isabel de Castro as Elena Montes
- Manuel Monroy as Joaquín Solari
- Tita Gracia as Mari Morales
- Soledad Lence as Vicenta
- Barta Barri as Don Pablo
- Carlos Otero as Maestro Luján
- María Zaldívar as Tía Rosa
- Juan Montfort as García
- Paco Martínez Soria as Jaime Miravall
- Mercedes Mozart as Alejandrina

== Bibliography ==
- Àngel Comas. Diccionari de llargmetratges: el cinema a Catalunya durant la Segona República, la Guerra Civil i el franquisme (1930-1975). Cossetània Edicions, 2005.
