= The Gang of Eight =

1962 film by Tulio Demicheli

- Directed by: Tulio Demicheli
- Written by: Pedro Mario Herrero; Florentino Soria
- Produced by: José López Moreno
- Cinematography: José F. Aguayo
- Edited by: José Antonio Rojo
- Music by: Isidro B. Maiztegui
- Production company: AS Films
- Distributed by: AS Films
- Release date: 27 August 1962
- Running time: 81 minutes
- Countries: Mexico; Spain
- Language: Spanish

The Gang of Eight (Spanish:La banda de los ocho) is a 1962 Mexican-Spanish comedy film directed by Tulio Demicheli.

== Cast ==
- Cesáreo Quezadas 'Pulgarcito'
- Luz Romero
- Antonio Vela as Quique
- Mari Loli Cobos as Cobo, Mari Loli
- Cristina Villerino
- Fernando Alcaide
- Mercedes Barranco
- José María Caffarel
- José Calvo
- José Vicente Cerrudo
- Francisco Díaz
- Ángel Díaz
- Alfonso Gallardo
- Luis Induni
- Nicolás D. Perchicot
- Mary Paz Pondal
- María Luisa Ponte
- Francisco Vázquez
- Ángel Álvarez

== Bibliography ==
- John King & Nissa Torrents. The Garden of Forking Paths: Argentine Cinema. British Film Institute, 1988.
