= Yelena Samarina =

Spanish actor (1927–2011)

- Born: 16 December 1927; Omsk, Soviet Union
- Died: 4 May 2011 (aged 83); Madrid, Spain
- Other name: Yelena Georgievna Vologzhaninova
- Occupation: Actress
- Years active: 1958-2004

Yelena Samarina (née Elena Georgievna Vologzhaninova | Vologzhanina, Volozhanina), 16 December 1927, Omsk – 4 May 2011, Madrid - was a Russian-born actress who settled in Spain. She was originally selected to play the lead in Wim Wenders' historical The Scarlet Letter (1973), but the film's financial backers insisted on the casting of the better-known Senta Berger.

== Selected filmography ==
- Cuéntame (2004)
- Antivicio (2001)
- La duquesa roja (1997)
- Don Juan in Hell (1991)
- The Tunnel (1988)
- Lulú de noche (1986)
- Coarse Salt (1984)
- Cervantes (1981)
- Madrid al desnudo (1979)
- Trout (1978)
- La Carmen (1976)
- Gone to the Mountain (1974)
- Daughter of Dracula (1972)
- The Man in Hiding (1971)
- Spaniards in Paris (1971)
- The House of 1,000 Dolls (1967)
- Currito of the Cross (1965)
- The Blackmailers (1963)
- The Balcony of the Moon (1962)
- Let's Make the Impossible! (1958)

== Bibliography ==
- R. Barton Palmer. Nineteenth-Century American Fiction on Screen. Cambridge University Press, 2007.
