= The Princess of the Ursines =

1947 film

- Directed by: Luis Lucia
- Written by: Alfonso Danvila; Carlos Blanco; Luis Lucia
- Produced by: Joaquín Cuquerella
- Starring: Ana Mariscal; Fernando Rey; Eduardo Fajardo
- Cinematography: José F. Aguayo; Alfredo Fraile
- Edited by: Juan Serra
- Music by: José Ruiz de Azagra
- Production company: CIFESA
- Distributed by: CIFESA
- Release date: 7 November 1947
- Country: Spain
- Language: Spanish

The Princess of the Ursines (Spanish: La princesa de los ursinos) is a 1947 Spanish historical film directed by Luis Lucia and starring Ana Mariscal, Fernando Rey, and Eduardo Fajardo. It was made by CIFESA, Spain's largest studio at the time. The film is loosely based on real events that took place in the eighteenth-century reign of Philip V of Spain.

== Plot ==
During the War of the Spanish Succession, King Louis XIV of France sends the Princess of the Ursines to Madrid to strengthen French influence at the Spanish court. Her mission is to persuade his grandson, King Philip V, to advance French interests and grant France certain concessions. Cardinal Portocarrero, suspicious of her intentions, asks Luis Carvajal to keep her under surveillance. However, the princess gradually becomes attached to Spain and falls in love with Carvajal. When the Archduke Charles launches an offensive against Spain, she returns to France to seek Louis XIV's support for Philip V.

== Cast ==
- Mariano Alcón as Secretario de Goncourt
- Emilio Alonso
- Mariano Asquerino as Torcy
- Julio Rey de las Heras as Ministro
- Manuel Dicenta as Capitán de control
- Adriano Dominguez as Jefe de corchetes
- Juan Espantaleón as Cardenal Portocarrero
- Eduardo Fajardo as Capitán emisario
- Félix Fernandez as Cochero
- Luis García Ortega as Conde de la Vega
- César Guzman
- José Isbert as Maese Pucheros
- María Isbert as Lidia
- José Jaspe as Truhán
- José María Lado as Embajador Goncourt
- Ana Mariscal as Ana María de la Tremouille
- Arturo Marín as D'Armegnon
- Julia Pachelo as Dama
- José Prada as Ortuzar
- Manuel Requena as Ventero
- Fernando Rey as Felipe V
- Roberto Rey as Luis Carvajal
- Santiago Rivero as Souville
- Conrado San Martín as Capitán de frontera
- Pilar Santisteban as La reina
- Isidro Sotillo as Secretario del cardenal
- Antonio Vadillo as Bronquista
- Aníbal Vela as Ministro de la Guerra

== Bibliography ==
- Mira, Alberto; Nouselles, Alberto Mira (2010). The A to Z of Spanish Cinema. Rowman & Littlefield. ISBN 978-0-8108-7622-4.
- Triana-Toribio, Núria. Spanish National Cinema. Routledge, 2012.
