= Alfonso Ungría =

Spanish film director and screenwriter

- Born: 30 March 1943 (age 83); Madrid, Spain
- Other name: Alfonso Ungría Ovies
- Occupations: Director, Screenwriter
- Years active: 1969–present

Alfonso Ungría (born 30 March 1943) is a Spanish screenwriter and film director.

== Selected filmography ==
- The Man in Hiding (1971)
- Gone to the Mountain (1974)
- África (1996)

== Bibliography ==
- Bentley, Bernard. A Companion to Spanish Cinema. Boydell & Brewer 2008.
