= At Five O'Clock in the Afternoon =

1961 film

- Directed by: Juan Antonio Bardem
- Written by: Alfonso Sastre; Juan Antonio Bardem
- Starring: Rafael Alcántara
- Cinematography: Alfredo Fraile
- Release date: 16 May 1961
- Running time: 103 minutes
- Country: Spain
- Language: Spanish

At Five O'Clock in the Afternoon (Spanish: A las cinco de la tarde, also released as At Five in the Afternoon) is a 1961 Spanish drama film directed by Juan Antonio Bardem and starring Rafael Alcántara. The film was selected as the Spanish entry for the Best Foreign Language Film at the 33rd Academy Awards, but was not accepted as a nominee. According to MGM records, the film made a profit of $46,000.

== Cast ==
- Rafael Alcántara as Acompañante
- Ramsay Ames as Americana
- Manuel Arbó as Camarero viejo
- Matilde Artero as Encargada de servicios
- Joaquín Bergía as Policía
- José Calvo as Amigo
- Germán Cobos as José Álvarez
- Faustino Cornejo as Amigo
- Rafael Cortés as Aficionado
- Enrique Diosdado as Manuel Marcos (as Enrique A. Diosdado)
- Núria Espert as Gabriela

== See also ==
- List of submissions to the 33rd Academy Awards for Best Foreign Language Film
- List of Spanish submissions for the Academy Award for Best Foreign Language Film
