= Carmelo Bernaola =

Spanish composer and clarinetist

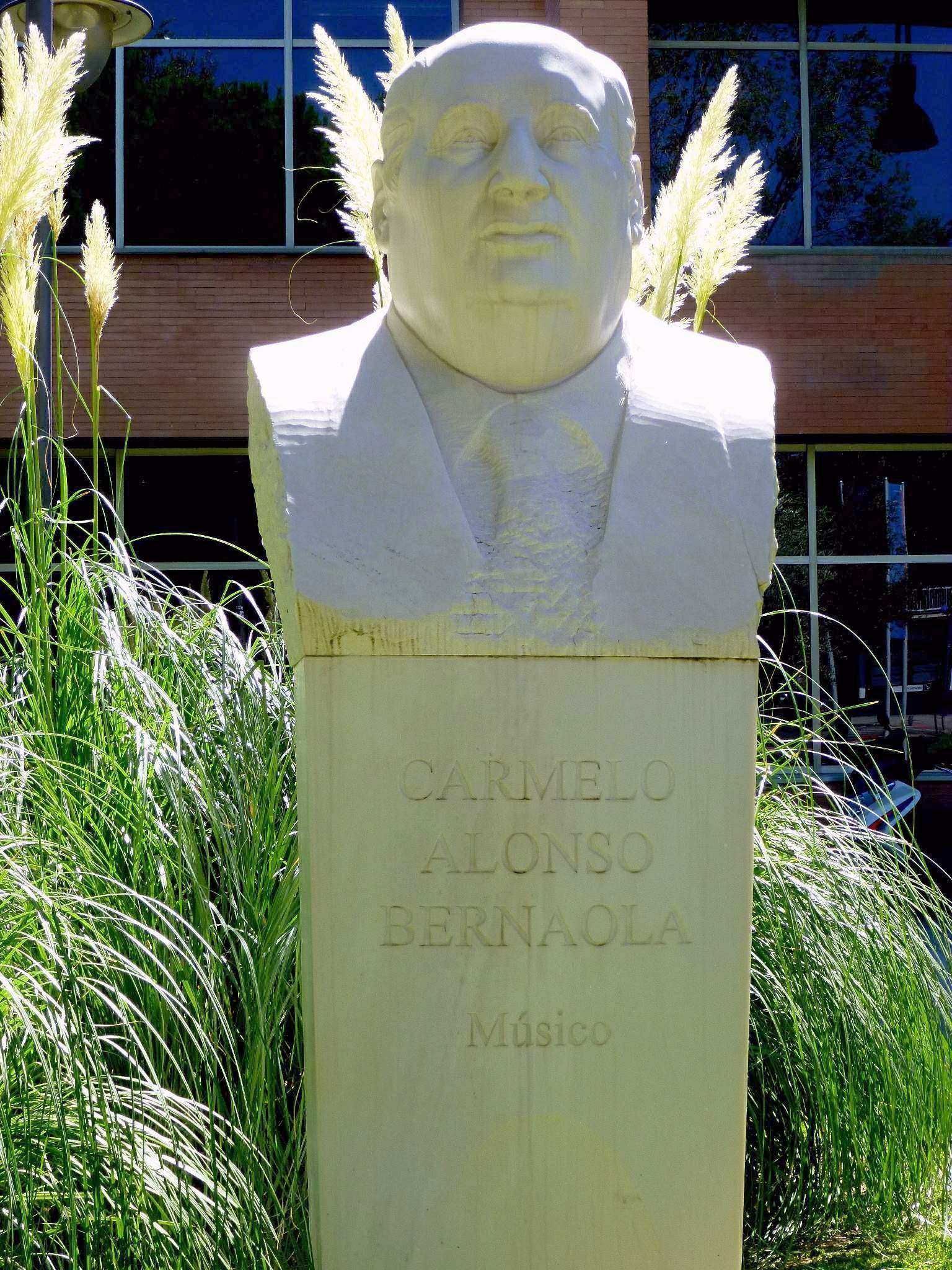
- Statue of Bernaola
- Born: 16 July 1929; Otxandio, Bizkaia, Spain
- Died: 5 June 2002 (aged 72); Madrid, Spain
- Occupations: Composer, clarinetist

Carmelo Alonso Bernaola (16 July 1929 – 5 June 2002) was a Spanish Basque composer and clarinetist. A member of the Generation of '51, he was one of the most influential composers in the Spanish musical scene of the second half of the 20th century. He composed more than 300 works in popular and academic forms including award-winning soundtracks for film and television, and is credited with introducing notions of chance to Spanish composition.

== Early years ==
Bernaola was born in Otxandio, Bizkaia, Spain. His father was Amado Alonso and his mother was Rufina Bernaola. He later chose to use his mother's surname, rather than his father's. When he was age 7, he and his family moved to Medina de Pomar (Burgos), where he received his first musical education. In 1943, he moved to the city of Burgos, where he studied with professor Blanco. In 1948, to allow him to continue studies without interruption by military service he joined the local Engineers Academy Band, playing clarinet.

In 1951, he obtained a job as clarinetist with the Band of the Armed Forces' Ministry and he moved to Madrid, gaining the rank of Sergeant. There he met various future members of the Generation of '51 including Cristóbal Halffter, Manuel Angulo y Ángel Arteaga. Together they worked to find new sounds and musical directions.

At Madrid Conservatory he studied counterpoint, fugue and composition with Massó, Calés Pina and Julio Gómez. In 1953, he got a new job as clarinettist with the Madrid City Band, and after winning various national prizes, he received a scholarship from the San Fernando Royal Academy of Fine Arts to continue his studies. In 1959, he obtained the Prix de Rome and moved to Italy where he lived from 1960 to 1962.

In Italy he studied composition with Goffredo Petrassi in the Accademia Nazionale di Santa Cecilia and conducting with Sergiu Celibidache in the Accademia Chigiana di Siena. These were two of the musicians that influenced him the most. In addition, during this period he participated in the Darmstadt International Summer Courses under the direction of Bruno Maderna and Olivier Messiaen and there he met Pierre Boulez, Karlheinz Stockhausen, Luigi Nono and Ramón Barce. In Spain, he completed his studies with André Jolivet and Alexander Tansman in Santiago de Compostela.

== Maturity ==
After returning to Madrid in 1962 he took up once again his clarinet place in the Municipal Symphony Band (Banda Sinfónica Municipal de Madrid), but dedicated the majority of his time to composition. He composed soundtracks for films and television as well as art pieces, totalling over 300 pieces in his career.

As well as composition, he worked as a professor of Harmony in the Madrid Conservatory and was director of the Jesús Guridi Conservatory in Vitoria-Gasteiz from 1981 until retiring in 1991.

In 1998, he received an honorary doctorate from Complutense University alongside Cristóbal Halffter, Luis de Pablo and Tomás Marco.

He died in hospital in Torrelodonis, Madrid of cancer at the age of 72.

== Musical Works ==
Within art music he is considered responsible for the introduction of modern classical to Spain, and the development of chance through his concept of flexible music, based on free interpretation within limits set by the composer. Key among his works are the three symphonies (1974, 1980, 1990), the Rondo for Orchestra (1992), Clamores y Secuencias (1993) and Song for Euskera (1995), a tribute to his native language. He also scored Adolfo Marsillach's 1989 theatre production of la Celestina.

Notable among his popular works are the 1982 arrangement of the Athletic Bilbao FC anthem Athleticen ereserkia, and numerous works for television series: El pícaro (1974), La clave (1976) y Verano azul (1981). Notable among the 82 film soundtracks he composed are Mambrú has gone to war (1986), Wait for me in heaven (1988) and the Goya-winning Pasodoble (1989).

The works indicated in this list do not include his compositions for several plays, films and TV shows. He regarded these "functional" compositions as distinct from his "real" catalogue of vocal and instrumental works.

- 1955: Trío-Sonatina (for oboe, clarinet and bassoon); Capricho (for clarinet and piano); Music for wind quintet.
- 1956: Three piano pieces.
- 1957: Suite-divertimento (piano and orchestra); Homenaje a Scarlatti (piano and orchestra); String Quartet No.1.
- 1958: Canción y danza (piano).
- 1959: Cuatro piezas infantiles (piano).
- 1960: Píccolo Concerto (violin and string ensemble); Constantes (voice, 3 clarinets and percussion).
- 1961: Superficie número 1 (chamber ensemble); Sinfonetta Progresiva (string ensemble).
- 1962: Espacios variados; Superficie número 2 (violoncello).
- 1963: Permutado (violin and guitar); Superficie número 4; Morfología sonora (piano).
- 1964: Mixturas.
- 1965: Heterofonías.
- 1966: Episodio (bass); Traza.
- 1967: Músicas de cámara.
- 1968: Continuo (piano).
- 1969: Polifonías.
- 1970: Oda für Marisa.
- 1971: Relatividades.
- 1972: Impulsos; Argia ezta ikusten.
- 1974: Sinfonía en do; Negaciones de San Pedro (bass and choir); Presencia (string quartet and piano); Per due.
- 1976: Superposiciones variables.; Así; Tiempos (violoncello and piano); Pieza I.
- 1977: Achode (clarinet quintet).
- 1978: Villanesca; Entrada; Juegos.
- 1979: A mi aire; Qué familia; Superficie número 5 (double bass).
- 1980: Variantes combinadas (chamber ensemble); Symphony No.2.; Galatea, Rocinante y Preciosa; Koankinteto; Variantes combinadas.
- 1981: Béla Bartók I; Tres piezas.
- 1984: Las siete palabras de Cristo en la Cruz.
- 1985: Variaciones concertantes (Espacios variados número 2).
- 1986: Nostálgico (piano and orchestra).
- 1987: Perpétuo, cántico, final (piano).
- 1988: El retablillo de Don Cristóbal; Per a Fréderic (trio).
- 1989: La Celestina.
- 1990: Symphony Nº 3.
- 1992: Scherzo.
- 2001: Fantasías.

== Selected filmography ==
- The Wild Ones of San Gil Bridge (1966)
- Días de viejo color (1967)
- Si volvemos a vernos (1967)
- Urtain, el rey de la selva... o así (1969)
- Love and Other Solitudes (1969)
- A House Without Boundaries (1972)
- Corazón solitario (1972)
- Gone to the Mountain (1974)
- Count Dracula's Great Love (1974)
- Sex o no sex (1974)
- Pim, pam, pum... ¡fuego! (1975)
- Pasodoble (1988), directed by José Luis García Sánchez, for which he won a Goya.

== Awards and recognitions ==
- 1955: Honorary Mention in the Spanish National Prize for Music.
- 1956: Samuel Ross Prize.
- 1956: National Composers Prize from the National Students Union (SEU).
- 1959: Prix de Rome (Spanish section).
- 1962: Spanish National Prize for Music.
- 1967: National Film Music Prize (Premio Nacional de Música Cinematográfica).
- 1967: Circle of Cinematographic Writers Award for Best Music (Días de viejo color and Si volvemos a vernos).
- 1969: Circle of Cinematographic Writers Award for Best Music (Del amor y otras soledades).
- 1972: Circle of Cinematographic Writers Award for Best Music (Corazón solitario).
- 1987: Gold Medal of Merit in Fine Arts.
- 1989: Goya for Best Original Film Score for Pasodoble, by José Luis García Sánchez.
- 1990: Gold Medal of Vitoria.
- 1992: Spanish National Prize for Music.
- 1994: Premio Sabino Arana.
- 1994: Academician of the San Fernando Royal Academy of Fine Arts.
- 1998: Honorary doctorate from Universidad Complutense.
- 2001: Music Prize of Fundación Guerrero.
