= Mariano Azaña =

Spanish actor (1896–1965)

- Born: 1896; Madrid, Spain
- Died: 10 May 1965 (aged 68–69); Madrid, Spain
- Other name: Mariano Azaña
- Occupation: Actor
- Years active: 1941-1965 (film)

Mariano Azaña (1896–1965) was a Spanish film actor.

== Partial filmography ==
- El milagro del Cristo de la Vega (1941)
- Primer amor (1942)
- ¿Por qué vivir tristes? (1942)
- Todo por ellas (1942)
- Schottis (1943)
- Hace cien años (1952)
- Segundo López (1953) - Podólogo
- Younger Brother (1953)
- I Was a Parish Priest (1953) - Fermín - el cartero
- The Other Life of Captain Contreras (1955) - George Hernández Piñada
- Miracle of Marcelino (1955) - Fray Malo - Brother Bad
- Afternoon of the Bulls (1956) - Julián
- Uncle Hyacynth (1956) - Cerillero
- Manolo guardia urbano (1956) - Capitán
- Pasión en el mar (1957) - Viejo marinero
- The Little Nightingale (1957) - Martín - el sacristán
- ...Y eligió el infierno (1957) - Párroco
- Historias de Madrid (1958) - El propietario del inmueble
- Carlota (1958)
- Las de Caín (1959) - Segismundo Caín y de la Muela
- Where Are You Going, Alfonso XII? (1959) - Gobernador
- El Salvador (1959)
- Back to the Door (1959) - Alvarito
- Maria, Registered in Bilbao (1960) - Consignatario de Málaga
- My Street (1960) - Trigo
- Fray Escoba (1961) - Fray Cirilo
- The Mustard Grain (1962) - Matilla
- A Nearly Decent Girl (1963) - Manolo
- Como dos gotas de agua (1963) - Juez Agustín Palacio
- Isidro el labrador (1964)
- La Dama de Beirut (1965) - (final film role)

== Bibliography ==
- Florentino Soria. José María Forqué. Editora Regional de Murcia, 1990.
