= A Nearly Decent Girl =

1963 film

- Directed by: Ladislao Vajda
- Written by: Hans Jacoby; István Békeffy; Luis de Diego
- Starring: Liselotte Pulver; Alberto de Mendoza; Martin Held
- Cinematography: Günther Anders
- Edited by: Antonio Ramírez de Loaysa
- Music by: Manuel Parada
- Production companies: Chamartín; Fono Film
- Distributed by: Columbia-Bavaria Film
- Release date: 10 October 1963
- Running time: 89 minutes
- Countries: West Germany; Spain
- Language: German

A Nearly Decent Girl (German: Ein fast anständiges Mädchen, Spanish: Una chica casi formal) is a 1963 West German-Spanish comedy film directed by Ladislao Vajda and starring Liselotte Pulver, Alberto de Mendoza and Martin Held.

== Synopsis ==
The secretary of a German CEO accompanies him on a business trip to Madrid where she falls in love with a local man.

== Partial cast ==
- Liselotte Pulver as Lili Steiner
- Alberto de Mendoza as Carlos García-Manzanares y Soler
- Martin Held as Robert Steckler
- Manolo Morán as Álvarez
- Juanjo Menéndez as José
- Miguel Gila as Rodríguez
- Mariano Azaña as Manolo
- Venancio Muro as José 'Pepe' de la Vega
- Alicia Altabella as Rosita
- María Cabo as Marisa
- Goyo Lebrero as Guía Madrid by Night
- Cris Huerta as Kronlick
- Ana María Custodio as Madre de Carlos (as Ana Mª Custodio)
- Xan das Bolas as Propietario bar
- Pedro Rodríguez de Quevedo as Recepcionista hotel
- Carmen Rodríguez as Abuela de Carlos
- Juan Cazalilla as Dependiente tienda confección
- Manuel Arbó as Primer hombre en pagar corbata
- Ángel Álvarez as Guía Don Quijote

== Bibliography ==
- Bock, Hans-Michael & Bergfelder, Tim. The Concise CineGraph. Encyclopedia of German Cinema. Berghahn Books, 2009.
