= Blood in the Snow =

- Directed by: Ramón Quadreny
- Written by: Emilio Graells; Ramón Quadreny
- Cinematography: Manuel Berenguer
- Music by: José Casas Augé; Federico Martínez Tudó
- Production company: Producciones Cinematográficas Alcázar
- Release date: 1942
- Running time: 87 minutes
- Country: Spain
- Language: Spanish

Blood in the Snow (Spanish: Sangre en la nieve) is a 1942 Spanish crime film directed by Ramón Quadreny. The film's plot deals with smuggling.

== Cast ==
- Alfonso Albalat
- Raúl Cancio
- Alfonsina de Saavedra
- Fernando Fernández de Córdoba
- Emilio Graells
- Marta Grau
- José María Lado
- Alberto Nogue

== Bibliography ==
- Bentley, Bernard. A Companion to Spanish Cinema. Boydell & Brewer 2008.
