= José Ramón Zaragoza =

Spanish painter (1874–1949)

Self-portrait (date unknown)

José Ramón Zaragoza Fernández (16 March 1874, Cangas de Onís - 29 July 1949, Alpedrete) was a Spanish painter, primarily known for genre scenes and female portraits.

== Biography ==
He began his studies at the School of Arts and Crafts in Oviedo with Ramón Romea y Ezquerra. In 1892, he entered a work in the National Exhibition of Fine Arts for the first time. In the Exhibition of 1897, he earned an honorable mention for "The Lesson". That same year, he received a grant from the Diputación de Asturias and was able to enroll at the Real Academia de Bellas Artes de San Fernando, where he studied with Luis Menéndez Pidal.

He was further honored at the Exhibitions of 1901, when he was awarded a Second Class prize for "A Sick Child", which drew its inspiration from a poem by José Caveda y Nava, and 1906, when he received another Second Class prize for "Orpheus in Hades".

Thanks to another grant, from the Spanish government, he was able to study at the Spanish Academy in Rome from 1904 to 1910. Later, he painted in Paris and London, and travelled through Brittany, the Netherlands and Germany. These travels produced four works that he presented at the Exhibition of 1915; one of which, the "Portrait of Mr. Th. S." (Thomas Stanton), achieved his long-sought First Class prize. He would participate in the Exhibition once more, in 1920, with a portrait of Pío Baroja and a work called "Blue Eyes".

He also exhibited internationally; receiving a silver medal at the Internationalen Kunstausstellung in Munich (1913) and an honorable mention at the Paris Salon of 1914.

In 1923, he held a solo exhibit at the Museo de Arte Moderno (Madrid), with twenty-eight works. Two years later, he won a competition to paint three ceiling panels at the new headquarters of the Círculo de Bellas Artes. In 1928, he was named a professor at the School of Arts and Crafts in Madrid and, in 1930, passed a competitive exam among former grant holders to become a professor of painting at the Real Academia. He was elected a member candidate there in 1948, but died before he had formally accepted the position.

The Potter

The Real Instituto Jovellanos of Gijón held a major retrospective of his works in 1976. A similar exhibition was held in 1977, by the Círculo de Bellas Artes. The largest number of his works may be seen at the Museum of Fine Arts of Asturias.
