= José Calvo =

Spanish actor (1916–1980)

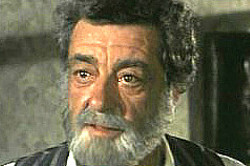
- José Calvo in The Price of Power (1969)
- Born: José Selgado; March 3, 1916; Madrid, Spain
- Died: May 16, 1980 (aged 64); Las Palmas, Gran Canaria, Canary Islands
- Years active: 1952–1980

José Calvo (March 3, 1916 – May 16, 1980) was a Spanish film actor best known for his roles in western films and historical dramas.

He made around 150 appearances mostly in films between 1952 and his death in 1980. He entered film in 1952 and was prolific as an actor throughout the 1950s and 1960s. He made many appearances in crime dramas, often with a historical theme and appeared in a high number of western films.

In 1964, he starred as the innkeeper Silvanito in Sergio Leone's Spaghetti Western production A Fistful of Dollars as one of Clint Eastwood's few "amigos" in the town of San Miguel. He later appeared in westerns such as Day of Anger (1967) opposite Lee Van Cleef, Anda muchacho, spara! (1971) and Dust in the Sun (1973) etc.

However, after the Spaghetti Western era of the late 1960s, in the 1970s he returned to appearing in primarily Spanish films and in contrast to the roles which dominated much of his career did appear in several Spanish comedy films often with slapstick humor as that genre grew popular in Latin cinema during this period.

He died in Gran Canaria on May 16, 1980, aged 64.

== Selected filmography ==
- Dulce nombre (1952)
- La forastera (1952)
- The Pelegrín System (1952) as Padre de Gelasio
- Babes in Bagdad (1952) (Spanish version)
- Concierto mágico (1953)
- La danza de los deseos (1954) as Padre de Candela
- Elena (1954)
- It Happened in Seville (1955) as Mayoral Manuel
- El indiano (1955) as Capataz
- La cruz de mayo (1955) as Fiscal
- El coyote (1955)
- Duelo de pasiones (1955)
- Un día perdido (1955) as Don Patricio
- El puente del diablo (1956) as Fiscal
- Ha pasado un hombre (1956) as García
- Uncle Hyacynth (1956) as Almacenista
- The Big Lie (1956) as Productor que habla con censor
- También hay cielo sobre el mar (1956)
- Todos somos necesarios (1956)
- Andalusia Express (1956) as Arturo
- El fenómeno (1956)
- La mestiza (1956) as Secretario
- Calle Mayor (1956) as Amigote #4 – Doctor
- Manolo guardia urbano (1956) as Conductor despistado
- Miracle of the White Suit (1956) as Ramón
- El maestro (1957) as Chauffeur
- Mensajeros de Paz (1957) as Ladrón en cárcel
- Ángeles sin cielo (1957) as Compinche de Curro
- Buongiorno primo amore! (1957) as Pepe
- Aquellos tiempos del cuplé (1958) as Cordero
- Heroes del Aire (1958) as Capitán
- El hincha (1958)
- El puente de la paz (1958)
- Red Cross Girls (1958) as Paciente de Andrés
- Marinai, donne e guai (1958) as complice di Aristotele
- Parque de Madrid (1959)
- Noi siamo due evasi (1959)
- Venta de Vargas (1959) as Ventero
- Una gran señora (1959) as Don Manuel
- El día de los enamorados (1959) as Nica
- El gafe (1959)
- El secreto de papá (1959)
- At Five O'Clock in the Afternoon (1960) as Amigo (uncredited)
- Juicio final (1960)
- El amor que yo te di (1960)
- El Litri y su sombra (1960) as Aficionado (uncredited)
- El hombre que perdió el tren (1960)
- Crimen para recién casados (1960) as Oficial naval
- El traje de oro (1960)
- La quiniela (1960)
- Don Lucio y el hermano pío (1960) as El pecas
- El vagabundo y la estrella (1960) as Eufrasio
- Alma aragonesa (1961) as Tío Ramón
- Viridiana (1961) as Don Amalio
- El indulto (1961) as Empleado estación de Madrid
- Fantasmas en la casa (1961)
- Kilómetro 12 (1961)
- Historia de un hombre (1961)
- The Gang of Eight (1962) as Padre de Miguelín
- I tromboni di Fra Diavolo (1962)
- The Castilian (1963) as Fraile
- The Running Man (1963) as Porter
- Shéhérazade (1963)
- El globo azul (1963)
- El sol en el espejo (1963) as Sr. Pardo
- Gunfight at Red Sands (1963) as Francisco (uncredited)
- The Swindlers (1963) as Brigadier (segment "Suore")
- Suspendido en sinvergüenza (1963)
- Júrame (1964)
- I maniaci (1964) (uncredited)
- Crucero de verano (1964) as Fodar
- Weeping for a Bandit (1964) as Cliente de la posada
- The Chosen Ones (1964) as Boquerón
- I marziani hanno 12 mani (1964) as Marito geloso
- A Fistful of Dollars (1964) as Silvanito
- Extraconiugale (1964) as Commendatore Sasselli (segment "Il mondo è dei ricchi")
- Oklahoma John (1965) as Rod Edwards
- La bugiarda (1965)
- Television Stories (1965) as Ramón Valladares
- El mundo sigue (1965) as Dueño Bar
- Legacy of the Incas (1965) (uncredited)
- Captain from Toledo (1965) as Don Canio
- Desperate Mission (1965) as The Director of the company
- La Dama de Beirut (1965)
- La primera aventura (1965) as Cosme
- In a Colt's Shadow (1965) as Sheriff
- Perché uccidi ancora (1965) as López
- Una ráfaga de plomo (1965) as Yusuff
- Weekend, Italian Style (1965) as Commendator Tagliaferri
- Platero y yo (1966) as Don José
- Due mafiosi contro Al Capone (1966) as Al Capone
- Monnaie de singe (1966) (uncredited)
- Nuevo en esta plaza (1966) as Tomás
- Web of Violence (1966)
- Che notte ragazzi! (1966) as Chófer
- For a Few Extra Dollars (1966) as Gordon
- Non faccio la guerra, faccio l'amore (1966) as Don Getulio
- El filo del miedo (1967) as Don César de Urdaz
- Day of Anger (1967) as Blind Bill
- Shoot Twice (1968) as Doctor Russell
- A Stranger in Paso Bravo (1968) as Vendedor de agua
- La notte è fatta per... rubare (1968) as Martin
- Rebus (1969) as Benson
- Cantando a la vida (1969)
- The Price of Power (1969) as Doctor Strips (uncredited)
- Golpe de mano (Explosión) (1970) as Padre de Novales
- Tristana (1970) as Campanero
- El Gran crucero (1970)
- The Underground (1970)
- Nights and Loves of Don Juan (1971) as Sultan Selim
- Dead Men Ride (1971) as Joselito Cosorito
- Murders in the Rue Morgue (1971) as Hunchback (uncredited)
- Los días de Cabirio (1971) as Padre de Mary Carmen
- Hector the Mighty (1972) as Lawyer
- Dust in the Sun (1972) as The Great Goldoni
- Tragic Ceremony (1972) as Sam David
- La redada (1973) as Jefe superior de Policía
- Carta de amor de un asesino (1973) as Ramón
- Little Funny Guy (1973) as Don Nicolone Salento
- Run, Run, Joe! (1974) as Don Salvatore
- Pim, pam, pum... ¡fuego! (1975) as Policía
- One Man Against the Organization (1975) as Zaccaria Rabajos
- Las bodas de Blanca (1975) as Cuñado de Antonio
- Esclava te doy (1976) as Juez
- Las delicias de los verdes años (1976) as D. Illán
- El secreto inconfesable de un chico bien (1976) as Don Gumersindo
- La espada negra (1976)
- Secretos de alcoba (1977) as Luis
- El último guateque (1977) as Don Julián
- The Frenchman's Garden (1978) as José Muñoz Lopera
- Mi mujer no es mi señora (1978) as Don Homero
- Soldados (1978)
- Tiempos de constitución (1979)
- En mil pedazos (1980) as Joaquín Faldrao
- ¡Qué verde era mi duque! (1980) as Palurdo
- Carta a nadie (1984) (final film role)
