= The Man in Hiding =

- Directed by: Alfonso Ungría
- Written by: Luis Mamerto López-Tapia; Emilio Martínez Lázaro; Augusto Martínez Torres; Alfonso Ungría
- Produced by: Luis Mamerto López-Tapia; Alfonso Ungría
- Starring: Carlos Otero; Yelena Samarina; Julieta Serrano
- Cinematography: Ramón F. Suárez
- Edited by: Juan Pisón
- Production company: Mota Films
- Release date: 28 October 1971
- Running time: 96 minutes
- Country: Spain
- Language: Spanish

The Man in Hiding (Spanish:El hombre oculto) is a 1971 Spanish drama film directed and co-written by Alfonso Ungría and starring Carlos Otero, Yelena Samarina and Julieta Serrano. Following the Spanish Civil War, a man goes into hiding to avoid arrest by the victorious Nationalist forces.

== Cast ==
- Carlos Otero as Martín
- Yelena Samarina as Amalia
- Julieta Serrano as Clara
- Luis Ciges as Santos
- Mario Gas as Novio de Belén
- Carmen Maura as Belén
- Cecilia Bayonas as Niña
- Laura Bayonas as Niña
- José María Nunes as Comandante
- Tatiana Samarina as Niña

== Bibliography ==
- Bentley, Bernard. A Companion to Spanish Cinema. Boydell & Brewer 2008.
