= Carlos Otero =

Portuguese actor

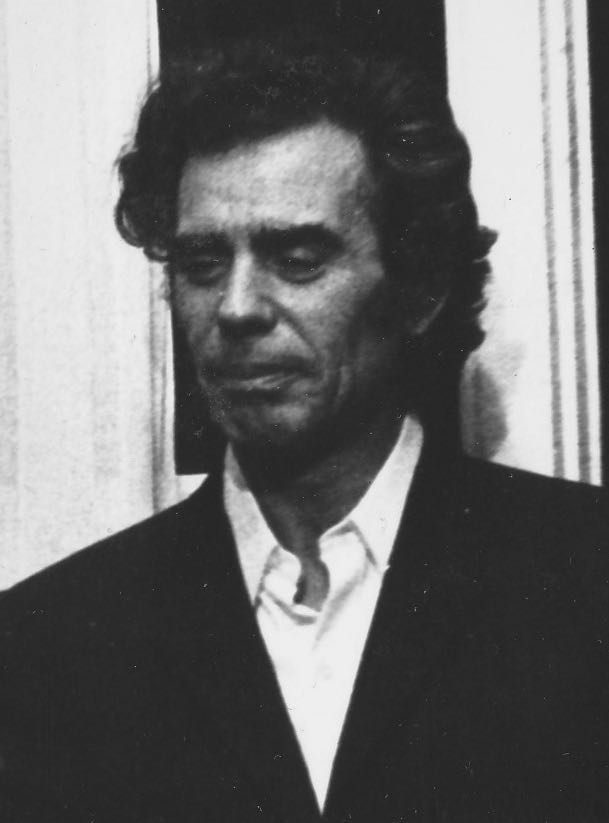
- Born: 30 May 1916; Lisbon, Portugal
- Other name: Carlos Otero Dos Santos Pereira
- Occupation: TV host
- Years active: 1942–1978 (film)

Carlos Otero (1916–1979) was a Portuguese film and television actor. He was married to the actress Isabel de Castro.

== Selected filmography ==
- Criminal Brigade (1950)
- Under the Skies of the Asturias (1951)
- Persecution in Madrid (1952)
- Forbidden Trade (1952)
- The Dance of the Heart (1953)
- Spanish Fantasy (1953)
- The Dance of the Heart (1953)
- There's a Road on the Right (1953)
- Isola Bella (1961)
- Operation Double Cross (1965) de Gilles Grangier
- Who Killed Johnny R.? (1966)
- The Man in Hiding (1971)
- My Horse, My Gun, Your Widow (1972)

== Bibliography ==
- Goble, Alan. The Complete Index to Literary Sources in Film. Walter de Gruyter, 1999.
