= Ignacio F. Iquino =

- Born: Ignacio Ferrés Iquino; October 25, 1910; Valls, Alt Camp
- Died: April 29, 1994 (aged 83); Barcelona
- Other names: Steve MacCohy, Steve McCohy, Steve McCoy, Prada-Iquino and John Wood
- Occupation(s): Film director, screenwriter, producer, cinematographer and editor
- Years active: 1934–1984
- Spouse: Juliana San José de la Fuente

Ignacio F. Iquino (October 25, 1910 – April 29, 1994) was a Spanish film director, screenwriter, producer, cinematographer and editor. He was the son of theater and film composer Ramón Ferrés and the actress Teresea Iquino.

He's most commonly known as a writer/producer/director of several low-budget paella westerns (a Spanish version of a spaghetti western), the better known of which starred Richard Harrison and Fernando Sancho. Iquino also worked with some other minor stars of the time, such as Erika Blanc in Stagecoach of the Condemned (1970).

From 1975 onwards, with the end of censorship in Spanish cinema, Iquino directed several films with a strong erotic content, such as Los violadores del amanecer, La Basura está en el ático, La caliente niña Julieta, La desnuda chica del relax, Los sueños húmedos de patrizia and Inclinación sexual al desnudo. Iquino was one of the first Spanish filmmakers to give visibility to transsexual actresses, such as Cristine Berna and Tessa Arno. He ended his career in 1984.

He died in Barcelona on April 29, 1994, at the age of 83.

== Selected filmography ==
- We Thieves Are Honourable (1942)
- Heart of Gold (1941)
- A Shadow at the Window (1944)
- The Drummer of Bruch (1948)
- The Vila Family (1950)
- Criminal Brigade (1950)
- Persecution in Madrid (1952)
- The Pelegrín System (1952)
- The Dance of the Heart (1953)
- Fire in the Blood (1953)
- The Louts (1954)
- One Bullet Is Enough (1954)
- Closed Exit (1955)
- La banda de los tres crisantemos (1970)
