= Adela Carboné =

Italian-born actress (1884–1960)

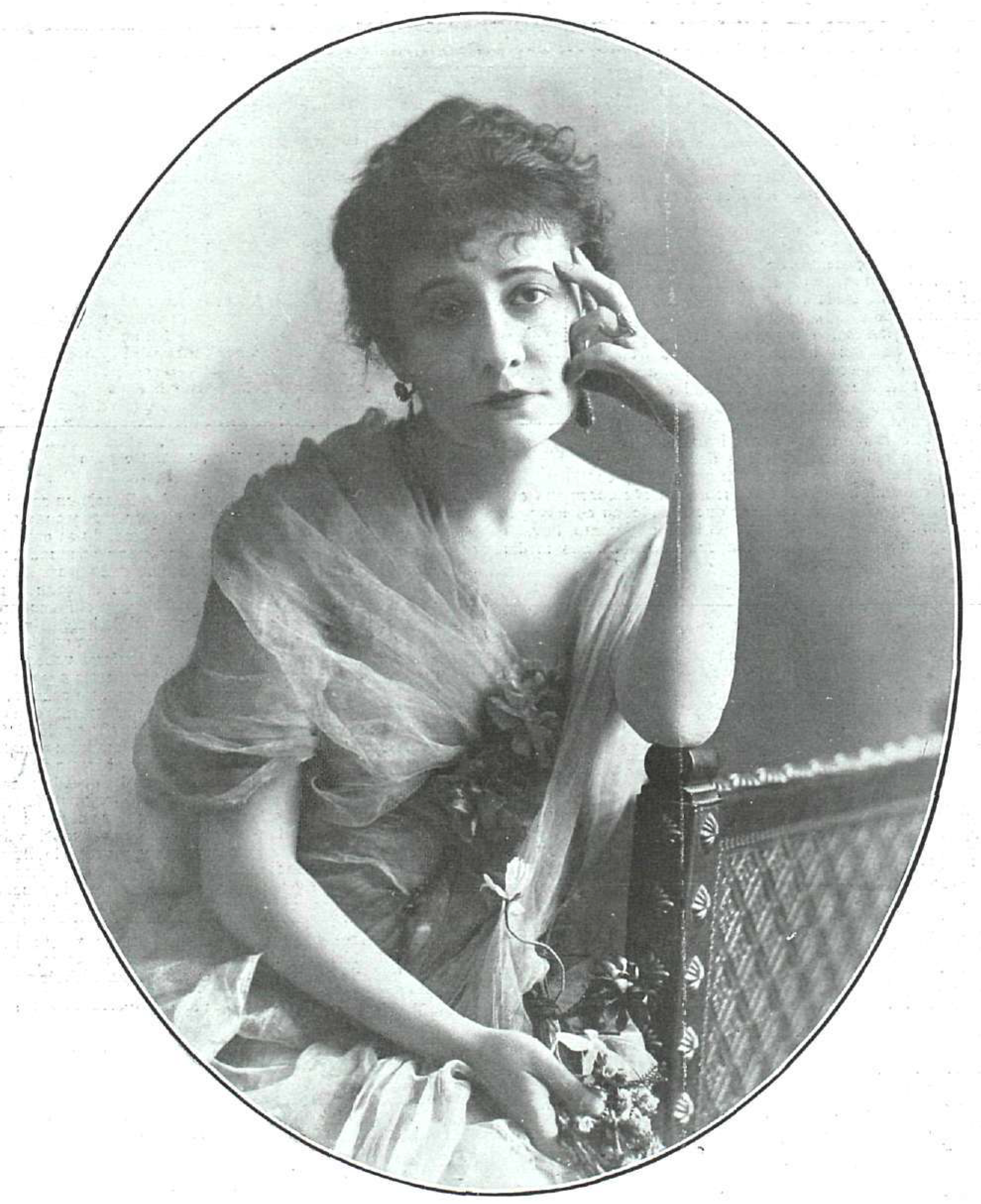
- Photograph by Kaulak (1916)
- Born: 1890; Genoa, Italy
- Died: 9 August 1960 (aged 69–70); Madrid, Spain
- Occupation: Actress
- Awards: National Theater Prize

Adela Carboné (1890 – 9 August 1960) was an Italian-born actress who lived in Spain.

== Biography ==
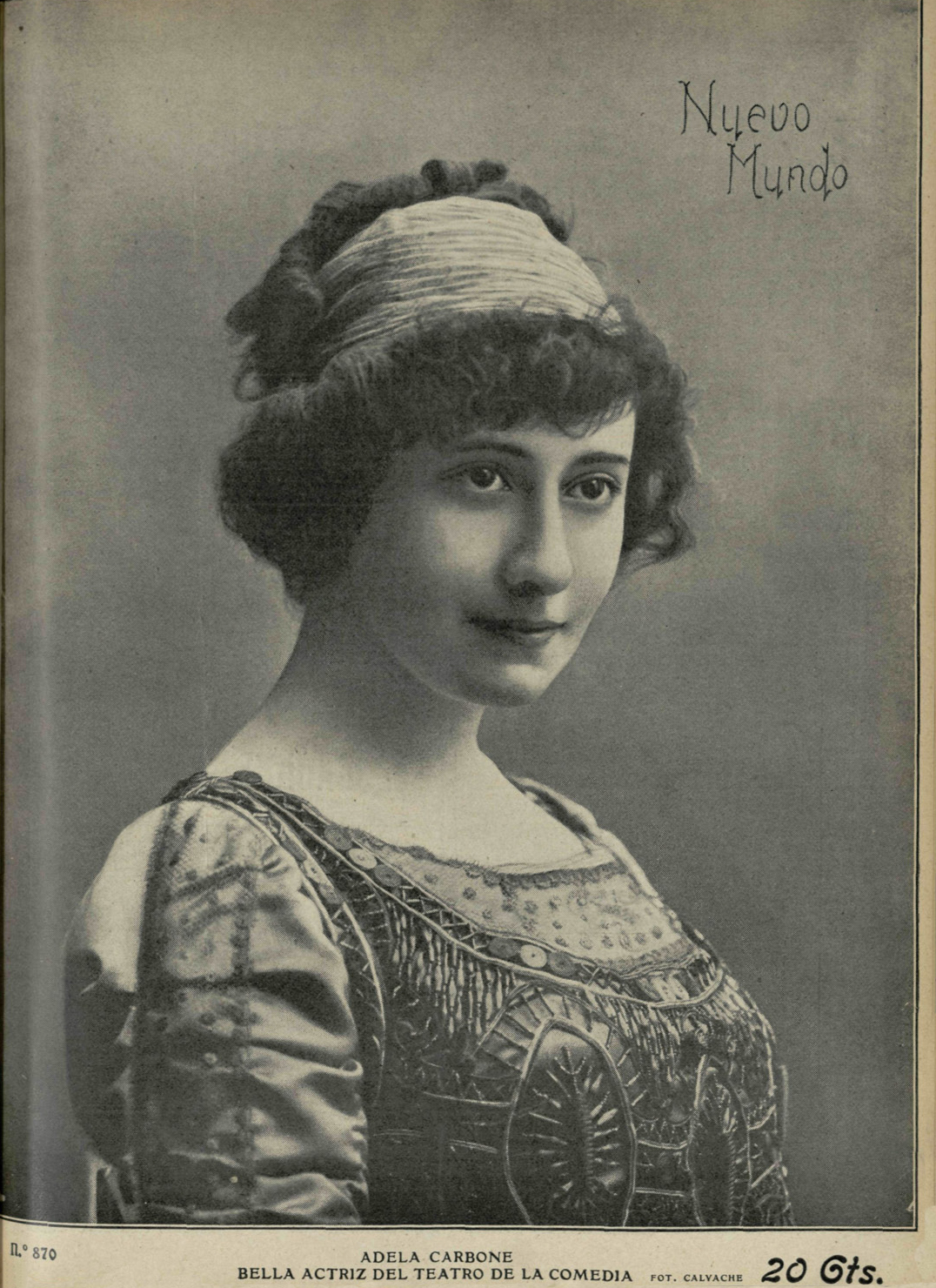
Adela Carbone (1910)

Adela Carboné was born in Genoa and moved to Spain when she was 10 years old. Dedicated to the theater at a young age, and after training with María Tubau, she debuted in the play Amor que pasa by the Quintero brothers at the Teatre Principal in Barcelona. She joined the Teatro de la Comedia, where she remained for 18 years. There she was featured in the plays La escuela de las princesas (1909) and La propia estimación (1915) by Jacinto Benavente, Genio y figura (1910) by Carlos Arniches, and El verdugo de Sevilla (1916) and El rayo by Pedro Muñoz Seca. Later she worked in the companies of Irene López Heredia and María Fernanda Ladrón de Guevara.

She acted in plays such as La noche del sábado, La venganza de Don Mendo, and Santa Juana de Castilla.

After the Spanish Civil War, Carboné continued her career until her retirement from the stage in 1959. During this time she appeared in plays such as Historia de una escalera (1949), El gran minué (1950), Celos del aire (1950), Veinte y cuarenta (1951), Ruy Blas (1952), The Italian Straw Hat (1952), Soledad (1953), The Taming of the Shrew (1953), The Crucible (1957), The Rose Tattoo (1958), El amor es un potro desbocado (1959), and El teatrito de don Ramón (1959).

Carboné acted in 20 films, including Jeromín (1953) and The Little Nightingale (1958).

She translated the Pirandello play Il carnevale dei morti into Spanish as Carnaval de los muertos. Her portrait was painted by José Ramón Zaragoza and exhibited at the Museum of Fine Arts of Asturias.

She died after a long and painful illness.

== Awards ==
- Gold Medal of the Círculo de Bellas Artes
- National Theater Prize (1955)
