= Matilde Artero =

Spanish actress

Matilde Artero is a Spanish actress who appeared in films from 1926 through 1961. She began her work in silent films, starting with Luis R. Alonso's La loca de la casa for Producciones Hornemann. Her first talkie was as 'Pepita' with Carlos Gardel in the 1933 French-made Les Studios Paramount Spanish musical romance Espérame, directed by Louis J. Gasnier. Her final screen appearance was in the production At Five O'Clock in the Afternoon, a Spanish drama film directed in 1961 by Juan Antonio Bardem.

== Filmography ==
Silent films

- La loca de la casa (1926)
- La ilustre fregona (1927)
- El orgullo de Albacete (1927)

Sound films

- Louis J. Gasnier|Espérame (1933) as Pepita
- Y tú, ¿qué haces? (1937)
- Barrios bajos (1937) as La Celestina
- La alegría de la huerta (1940)
- Una conquista difícil (1941)
- Heart of Gold (1941) as Rosa
- Pánico en el transatlántico (1942)
- We Thieves Are Honourable (1942)
- Malvaloca (1942) as Doña Enriqueta
- Audiencia pública (1946)
- Don Quixote de la Mancha (1947) as Doña Rodríguez
- Four Women (1947)
- Confidences (1948) as Pueblerina
- A Man on the Road (1949)
- Cuento de hadas (1951)
- Malibran's Song (1951)
- Lola, la piconera (a.k.a. Lola, the Coalgirl) (1952) as Vieja de la reja
- Cerca de la ciudad (1952) as Criada de Doña Casilda
- Come Die My Love (1952)
- Barco sin rumbo (1952)
- Segundo López, aventurero urbano (1953)
- ¡Che, qué loco! (1953) as Clotilde
- La alegre caravana (1953)
- La moza de cántaro (1954)
- Malvaloca (1954)
- Cómicos (a.k.a. Comedians) (1954)
- Amor sobre ruedas (1954)
- Agua sangrienta (1954)
- Noche de tormenta (1955)
- Nubes de verano (a.k.a. Summer's Clouds) (1955)
- Suspiros de Triana (a.k.a. Sighs of Triana) (1955)
- Una aventura de Gil Blas (a.k.a. The Adventures of Gil Blas) (1956)
- Encuentro en la ciudad (1956)
- Don Juan (1956)
- Curra Veleta (1956)
- Manolo guardia urbano (1956) as Vieja
- Piedras vivas (1956)
- Un fantasma llamado amor (1957)
- Ángeles sin cielo (a.k.a. Angels Sky) (1957)
- El hereje (1958)
- Llegaron dos hombres (a.k.a. Two Men in Town) (1959)
- They Fired with Their Lives (1959)
- Juicio final (1960)
- An American in Toledo (1960)
- At Five O'Clock in the Afternoon (1961) as Encargada de servicios
