= En carne viva (1954 film) =

- Directed by: Enrique Cahen Salaberry
- Starring: Ana Mariscal, Alberto Closas, Georges Rivière
- Release date: 1954
- Running time: 90 minutes
- Country: Argentina
- Language: Spanish

En carne vive is a 1954 Argentine film directed by Enrique Cahen Salaberry and starring Alberto Closas and Ana Mariscal.

== Cast ==
- Ana Mariscal
- Alberto Closas
- Georges Rivière
- Nelly Meden
- Nicolás Fregues
- Ángeles Martínez
- Eduardo Naveda
- Isabel Pradas
- Víctor Martucci
- Panchito Lombard
- Raquel Benet
- Marisa Núñez
- Eduardo Norevo
- Alberto Lagos
- Julio Bianquet
- Pablo Cumo
- Félix Tortorelli
- Justo Martínez
- Tomás Alonso
- Arturo Arcari
- Martha Atoche
- Roberto Contreras
- Carmen Lloveras
- Jorge Morales
- André Norevó
- Marcela Sola
- Marcelo Sosa
- Alba Varela
