= Isabel de Castro =

Portuguese actress

- Born: Isabel Maria Bastos Osório de Castro e Oliveira; August 1, 1931; Lisbon, Portugal
- Died: November 23, 2005 (aged 74); Borba, Évora, Portugal
- Occupation: Actress
- Years active: 1946-2003

Isabel Maria Bastos Osório de Castro e Oliveira (August 1, 1931 – November 23, 2005) was a Portuguese film actress.

== Biography ==
She was born in the capital Lisbon in 1931 to José Osório de Castro e Oliveira (Setúbal, 27 January 1900 - Lisbon, 3 December 1964) and writer Raquel Bastos, granddaughter of the writer Ana de Castro Osório, brother of the writer João Osório de Castro.

Castro's career began with the movie Ladrão, Precisa-se! in 1946. Later, she appeared in some Spanish films including Under the Skies of the Asturias where she played as Angelina Quirós, The Pelegrín System, Lawless Mountain as Maria and in El cerco. She played in more Portuguese films including Francisca (1981), O Desejado (1987) and Hard Times (1988). In the mid-1990s, she went to Cape Verde, appearing in the films Down to Earth (1995) and The Island of Contenda (1996), the latter based on the novel by Henrique Teixeira de Sousa, in which she played the character of Nha Caela. Her last movie was A Casa Esquecida, in 2004. She appeared in about 50 films and appeared in theatre and television.

She died of cancer in Borba near Évora.

== Personal life ==
In 1948, she married Óscar Acúrsio, she later married Miguel Luke

== Selected filmography ==
Year	Film	Role
1946	Ladrão, Precisa-se!	
1950	Criminal Brigade	
1951	Under the Skies of the Asturias	Angelina Quirós
1952	Forbidden Trade	
1952	The Pelegrín System	Luisa
1952	Persecution in Madrid	
1953	Lawless Mountain	María
1953	The Dance of the Heart	Elena Montes
1981	Francisca	
1987	O Desejado	
1988	Hard Times	
1992	Xavier	
1995	Down to Earth	
1995	The Island of Contenda	Nha Caela
1998	Traffic	Casca
2004	A Casa Esquecida	

=== Short films ===
- A Voice of the Night (1998)
- Jerónimo (1998)
- Henrique (2001)
