= Ramón Quadreny =

Spanish film director and actor

- Born: 5 April 1892; Barcelona, Spain
- Died: 1961 (aged 68–69)
- Occupations: Actor, Director
- Years active: 1914-1961 (film)

Ramón Quadreny (1892–1961) was a Spanish film director and actor. He directed the 1942 smuggling thriller Blood in the Snow.

== Selected filmography ==
=== Director ===
- Blood in the Snow (1942)
- The Big Show (1960)

=== Actor ===
- Juan José (1917)
- Closed Exit (1955)

=== Editor ===
- Under the Skies of the Asturias (1951)
- The Dance of the Heart (1953)
- One Bullet Is Enough (1954)
- The Louts (1954)

== Bibliography ==
- Bentley, Bernard. A Companion to Spanish Cinema. Boydell & Brewer 2008.
