= List of first horror films by country =

This is a list of first horror films by country.

== List ==
Country	Year	Title	Original title	Director(s)	Notes
Argentina	1942	A Light in the Window	Una luz en la ventana	Manuel Romero	with Narciso Ibáñez Menta, Irma Córdoba, Juan Carlos Thorry
Austria (Note: Co-production.)	1918	Alraune	Alraune	Michael Curtiz, Edmund Fritz	with Géza Erdélyi; lost film
Brazil	1964	At Midnight I'll Take Your Soul	À Meia-Noite Levarei Sua Alma	José Mojica Marins	with José Mojica Marins and the first installment of the "Coffin Joe trilogy".
Canada	1961	The Mask (Eyes of Hell)		Julian Roffman	with Paul Stevens, Claudette Nevins, Bill Walker
Czechoslovakia	1936	Golem	Le Golem	Julien Duvivier	with Harry Baur, Roger Karl, Ferdinand Hart; Czechoslovak-French monster movie
Denmark	1916	Blind Justice	Hævnens nat	Benjamin Christensen	with Benjamin Christensen, Karen Caspersen, Ulla Johansen
France	1896	The House of the Devil	Le Manoir du diable	Georges Méliès	with Jehanne D'Alcy.
Germany	1913	The Student of Prague	Der Student von Prag	Stellan Rye, Paul Wegener	with Paul Wegener, John Gottowt, Grete Berger. Critic Roger Ebert considers the film The Cabinet of Dr. Caligari (1920) "the first true horror film".
Hungary	1918	Alraune	Alraune	Michael Curtiz, Edmund Fritz	with Géza Erdélyi; lost film
India	1946	Khooni	ख़ूनी	K. L. Kahan	with Raj Rani, Navin Chandra, Hari Mohan, Baburao Pahalwan See also: Mahal (1949)
Italy	1911	Dante's Inferno	L'Inferno	Francesco Bertolini, Adolfo Padovan, Giuseppe De Liguoro	with Salvatore Papa, Arturo Pirovano, Giuseppe de Liguoro, Augusto Milla
Japan	1898	Resurrection of a Corpse	Shinin No Sosei		written by Eijiro Hatta See also Bake Jizo (Jizo the Spook, 1898)
South Korea	1960	The Housemaid	Hanyeo (하녀)	Kim Ki-young	with Lee Eun-shim, Ju Jeung-nyeo and Kim Jin-kyu.
The Netherlands	1909	The Grip	De Greep	Leon Boedels	with Louis Bouwmeester, Ko van Sprinkhuysen; Dutch film
New Zealand	1982	The Scarecrow (Klynham Summer)		Sam Pillsbury	with Jonathan Smith, Tracy Mann, John Carradine.
Pakistan	1964	Madman	Deewana	Mubarak Malik	Deewana is a first Pakistani horror film.
Philippines	1959	Terror Is a Man		Gerardo de León, Eddie Romero	with Francis Lederer, Greta Thyssen, Richard Derr; Filipino/American film
Poland	1970	Lokis	Lokis	Janusz Majewski	with Józef Duriasz, Edmund Fetting. See also: Rosemary’s Baby (1968) - American film by Polish director Roman Polanski.
Romania	1992	Miss Christina	Domnișoara Christina	Viorel Sergovici	Adrian Pintea, Mariana Buruiană, Irina Petrescu
Russia	1909	Viy	Вий	Vasili Goncharov	I. Langfeld, A. Platonov, V. Dalskaya
Serbia	1969	The Gifts of My Cousin Maria	Darovi moje rođake Marije	Đorđe Kadijević	with Ljiljana Krstić, Neda Spasojević, Slobodan Perović
Spain	1934	The Tower of the Seven Hunchbacks	La Torre de los Siete Jorobados	Edgar Neville	With Antonio Casal, Isabel de Pomés. It is based on a novel of the same title by Emilio Carrere.
Sweden	1921	The Phantom Carriage	Körkarlen	Victor Sjöström	with Hilda Borgström
United Kingdom	1897	The X-Rays		George Albert Smith	with Tom Green, Laura Bayley.
United States	1908	Dr. Jekyll and Mr. Hyde		Otis Turner (unconfirmed)	16 minutes; with Hobart Bosworth, Betty Harte
Yugoslavia	1969	The Gifts of My Cousin Maria	Darovi moje rođake Marije	Đorđe Kadijević	with Ljiljana Krstić, Neda Spasojević, Slobodan Perović

== See also ==
- Lists of horror films
