= Leptirica =

1973 Serbian film

- DVD cover
- Genre: Folk Horror; Drama; Fantasy
- Based on: "After Ninety Years" by Milovan Glišić
- Written by: Đorđe Kadijević
- Screenplay by: Đorđe Kadijević
- Directed by: Đorđe Kadijević
- Starring: Mirjana Nikolić; Petar Božović; Slobodan Perović; Vasja Stanković; Tanasije Uzunović; Toma Kuruzović
- Country of origin: Yugoslavia
- Original language: Serbo-Croatian

Production
- Cinematography: Branko Ivatović
- Editor: Neva Paskulović-Habić
- Running time: 63 minutes
- Production company: Radio Television Belgrade

Original release
- Network: TV Belgrade
- Release: 15 April 1973

Leptirica (Serbian Cyrillic: Лептирица, lit. 'The She-Butterfly') is a 1973 Yugoslav folk horror TV-film, directed by Serbian and Yugoslav director Đorđe Kadijević and based on the short story "After Ninety Years" (1880) by Serbian writer Milovan Glišić.

Although not the first Yugoslav film with horror elements, Leptirica is often described as "the first real horror film" made in Serbia and Yugoslavia, cited as the pioneering work of the genre in Serbian and Yugoslav cinema and proclaimed one of the top Serbian and Yugoslav horror films by critics and audience alike.

== Plot ==
The grumpy landowner Živan visits a watermill on the edge of the forest, bringing wheat to be milled into flour. While he converses with Vule, a miller, strange sounds are heard outside the mill, and Vule believes that they're coming from some bird. The two spot Živan's daughter, Radojka, on the hill with her sheep, and Vule comments how beautiful she is, stating that she looks "like a she-butterfly."

During the night, Vule once again hears strange sounds coming from the forest. While he sleeps, the millstone suddenly stops turning, and a strange human-like creature with black hands, a hairy face, and long teeth enters the mill. It grabs a handful of flour, and after having inspected it, attacks Vule and kills him by biting his neck. The millstone starts to turn again. One of the peasants from the nearby village of Zarožje discovers Vule's body the following morning, and runs off in horror to inform the village mayor about his discovery.

The film turns into a romance between Radojka and a poor young man named Strahinja.

The two meet secretly, because Živan disapproves of their relationship. In the meantime, the mayor of neighboring Zarožje, the village priest, and several villagers discuss the death of their miller. It is revealed that Vule is the fourth miller to be killed in the mill over the course of one year, and the villagers suspect that the men were killed by a vampire named Sava Savanović.

Strahinja approaches Živan, asking for Radojka's hand in marriage, but Živan banishes him from his yard. Disappointed, Strahinja bids farewell to Radojka and leaves his village. While passing through Zarožje, he meets villagers who are discussing the cursed mill, and accepts their offer to become the new miller. He spends the night in the mill, sleeping in its attic. He is horrified by the vampire's visit, falls down from the attic, and lands in bags of flour, but survives the night.

In the morning, the villagers come to the mill and find Strahinja alive. He tells them that he saw the creature. The villagers are now convinced that it was Sava Savanović, who had died decades before. The villagers visit the oldest woman in a neighboring village to ask her if she knows anything about Sava Savanović. She reveals that Sava was buried in a crooked ravine under a crooked elm tree.

After having attempted unsuccessfully to find Sava Savanović's grave, the villagers decide to use an old method of finding a vampire's grave by guiding a black stallion through the area. They realize that Živan is the only man in the region who owns a black stallion, so Zarožje's mayor goes off to borrow it. The mayor asks Živan why he refused to approve of Radojka's and Strahinja's marriage; Živan remains firm in his decision and doesn't reveal his reasons for the refusal. Radojka hears the bird-like sounds and follows them into the forest. She is shown lying on the ground, sleeping. She wakes up with a smile on her lips.

Strahinja and villagers from Zarožje guide the stallion through a ravine, and the horse reveals the location of the grave. They start digging and find a coffin. While the priest reads out a prayer, they nail a stake of hawthorn-wood through the coffin and attempt to pour holy water into the hole. However, a white butterfly escapes from the hole. The villagers do not manage to catch it, but are nevertheless satisfied, believing that they have killed the vampire.

During the celebration in the village, they promise Strahinja to help him. In the evening, they take Radojka away from her home and bring her to Zarožje, escaping the infuriated Živan. The whole village welcomes the couple, and the villagers start to prepare for their wedding. In order to prevent the couple from consummating their relationship before the marriage, an old woman is tasked with guarding the house in which the bride-to-be is staying, in accordance with an old custom. Radojka, however, accepts Strahinja's offer to visit her during the night. As the sun is setting, the strange sounds are heard once again.

The old woman who is guarding the girl falls asleep, and Strahinja sneaks past her. As he undresses the sleeping Radojka, he discovers a bloody hole under her breasts. Radojka opens her eyes and transforms into a hairy creature with sharp teeth. She jumps onto Strahinja's back and leads him to Sava Savanović's grave, where she forces him to remove the stake from the coffin. When he does so, she collapses on the ground. The coffin opens, and a doppelganger of Radojka in her vampiric form climbs out of it, having the same stake-inflicted wound between her breasts. While she climbs out of the hole, Strahinja manages to impale her with the stake.

The villagers wake up after the night of celebrating. When they realize that Strahinja sneaked into Radojka's room, they joke and laugh, unaware that the couple is actually not in the house. Strahinja is shown lying on the ground, motionless, with a butterfly, which is fluttering its wings, in his hair.

== Cast ==
- Mirjana Nikolić as Radojka
- Petar Božović as Strahinja
- Slobodan "Cica" Perović as Živan
- Vasja Stanković as the village mayor
- Tanasije Uzunović as the priest
- Aleksandar Stojković as Purko, a peasant
- Ivan Đurđević as Sredoje, a peasant
- Bogoljub Petrović as Ćebo, a peasant (credited as Boban Petrović)
- Branko Petković as a peasant
- Toma Kuruzović as Vule, the miller

== Production ==
In a 2023 interview, Kadijević stated that in the early 1970s, he was forced to turn away from cinema and venture into directing for television, as he had been a prominent figure of the Yugoslav Black Wave movement and the authorities' censorship in cinema was starting to strengthen:

All of us who had been making similar films—Dušan Makavejev, Žika Pavlović, Aleksandar "Saša" Petrović, Želimir Žilnik, Kokan Rakonjac and so on—had the "Black Wave" label essentially slapped on us because we mildly and restrainedly reacted in a critical manner to the apologetics of both the [Yugoslav communist] revolutionary past as well as the supposedly heroic, renewal-focused post-World War II enthusiasm lifting the country from the ashes of war. And there was a price to pay for doing that. Saša Petrović lost his professorial job at the Academy of Theatre, Film, Radio and Television. Makavejev was stripped of any chance to make movies [in Yugoslavia], but, because he had already gained a measure of international recognition, he moved abroad and began anew, kicking around the globe in search of financing for his movies. Žika Pavlović was probably the only one who played his cards right as he had been close friends with Oskar Davičo and decided to do a TV series based on Davičo's novel Pesma, so he somehow got forgiven [by the communist authorities]. But the rest of us were fully aware that we would never again get an opportunity to make a theatrical film. That's when I decided to switch to another genre. I went to [Yugoslav] television where the people were different [from the ones in Yugoslav cinema]. At the time, Yugoslav film producers were Party-installed people who knew nothing about film, as their sole purpose was to act as protagonists of an ever-vigilant ideological consciousness preventing anything outside the desired image of the [Yugoslav communist] revolutionary past from appearing in films. [...] That's when I moved to the historical and fantasy genres.

The movie was filmed in the village of Zelinje, near the river Drina, close to the city of Zvornik. The 19th century mill that appears in the movie is still in its original location. The film was made in less than a month.

Kadijević found the strange sounds that can be heard throughout the film with the help of the workers of Television Belgrade musical department. The sounds used were the recordings of a species of birds which lives in the uninhabited areas of India.

== Deviations from Milovan Glišić's short story ==
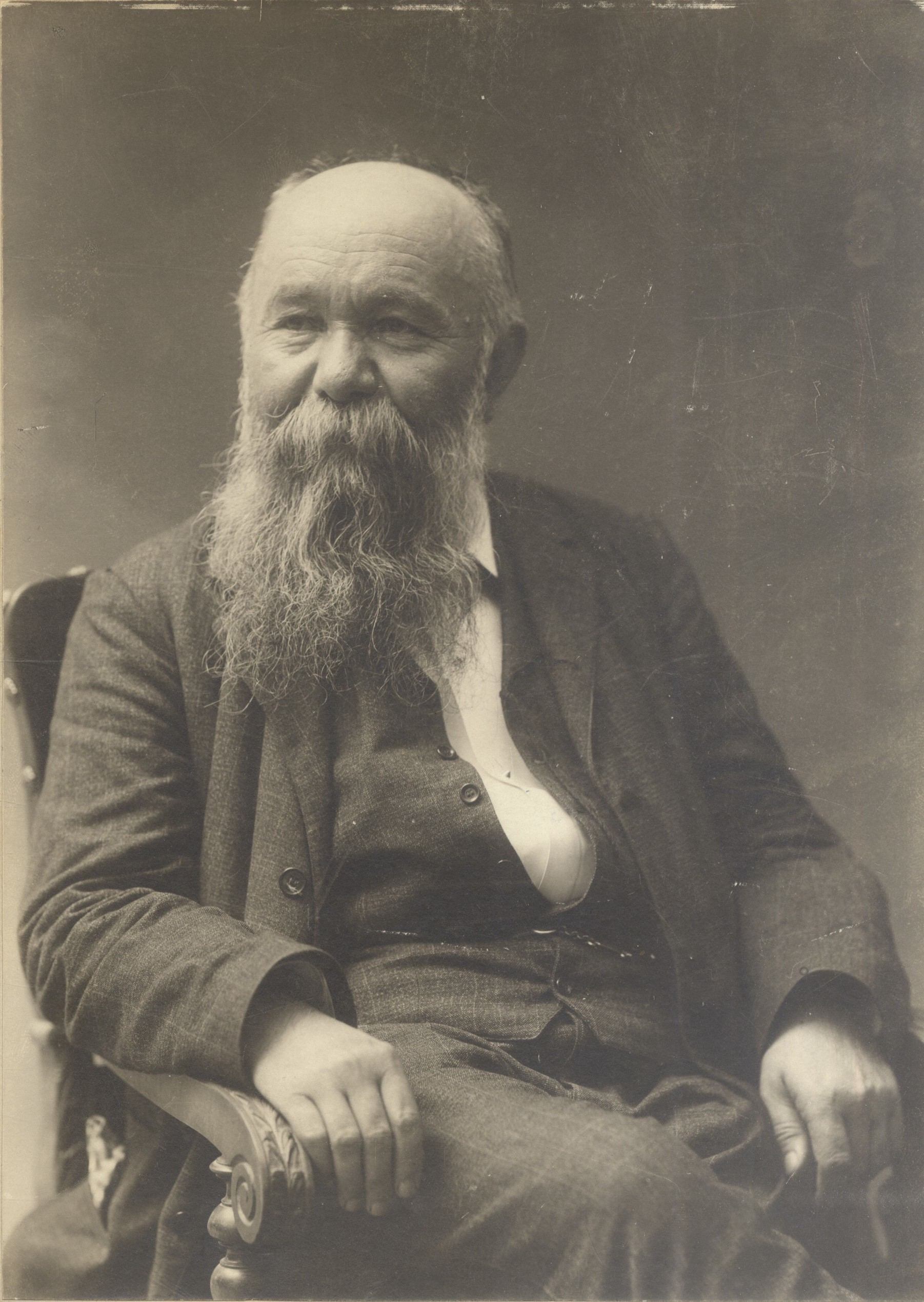
Serbian writer Milovan Glišić, author of the short story After Ninety Years, on which the film was based

While in the film the villagers conclude the millers were killed by the vampire Sava Savanović, in the story it is Strahinja who discovers that the creature killing the millers is a vampire and manages to discover its name. He drags a timber into the mill and covers it with a blanket, making it seem like a lying person, and hides in the attic with two rifles. After the vampire enters the mill, he grabs a handful of flour, inspects it and sits by the fire. After some time, he jumps on the timber believing that it is the sleeping miller. When he realizes that he was tricked, the vampire shouts: "Hey, Sava Savanović, after ninety years of being a vampire, never have you remained dinnerless the way you did tonight!" Strahinja fires his rifles, forcing Sava to scream and disappear. While in the film the villagers nail the stake through the coffin without opening it, in the story they open it and spot two rifle wounds on the vampire's chest that are almost healed.

While in the film the vampire(ss) is depicted as a hairy, dark-skinned creature, in the story Sava Savanović is described as a "rather tall man with a blood-red face" and "a linen cloak across his shoulders, falling down his back to his heels". When the villagers open the coffin, they find Sava's body preserved "as if laid there yesterday", with blood-red skin and "stuffed like a turkey".

In the original story, the narrator explains that the butterfly escaping from Sava's body "could not harm grown people" and that it "had been taking life of children from Zarožje and Ovčina long time before it disappeared".

The most prominent difference between the story and the film is that in the story Radojka does not turn into a vampire. After Sava Savanović is killed and Strahinja and Radojka are wed, the celebration is visited by Živan, who, realizing he has no other choice, makes peace with the couple and the Zarožje villagers, and the newlyweds return to their home village.

== Reception, influence and legacy ==
Upon its release, the film received much attention from the Yugoslav public. The reactions of film critics were mixed. Some praised the film and compared it to the best works of horror in world cinema, while others criticized the director's and TV Belgrade's intention to scare the audience, a large part of which was still traumatized by events of World War II.

Leptirica was not the first Yugoslav film with horror elements. It was preceded by two films, both also directed by Kadijević for Television Belgrade, Darovi moje rođake Marije (The Gifts of My Cousin Maria, 1969) and Štićenik (Ward, 1973), the first inspired by a story by Serbian writer Momčilo Nastasijević and the latter based on a story by Serbian writer Filip David. However, as Serbian writer and film and literary critic Dejan Ognjanović stated: "Those two early films are known today only to the biggest film lovers. At the time, the audience didn't perceive them as horror films: on the contrary, the records reveal that the audience viewed them as boring and incomprehensible. The Gifts of My Cousin Maria is basically a dreary TV drama, which can be viewed as a horror film in retrospective, as a part of Kadijević's poetics and as a part of studies of horror motifs in our cinema. Ward too was an uncommunicative art film." Thus, Leptirica is often viewed as "the first real horror film" in the history of Serbian and Yugoslav cinema. Kadijević himself stated on several occasions that he had never considered Leptirica a horror film, and that he had never been interested in horror as a genre. He stated that he viewed Leptirica as a fantasy film dealing with the presence of metaphysical evil in the human conscience.

Ognjanović and screenwriter Aleksadar Radivojević both regretfully stated that Leptirica, although a pioneering work of Serbian and Yugoslav horror film, had little influence on Serbian and Yugoslav cinema in that the film's popularity did not result in horror genre gaining more acceptance among Serbian and Yugoslav filmmakers. Radivojević stated: "Leptirica did not influence our cinema much, because our cinema stands stubbornly firm in its artistic approach and defends itself from the horror genre, seeing it as something allegedly less serious, less potent and artistically less valuable." Both of them, however, agree that Leptirica made a lasting impression on the Yugoslav audience. The fact that it was the first Yugoslav film of its kind made Leptirica widely remembered as "the scariest film ever" by a number of people across former Yugoslavia. After the film was first aired, there were numerous rumors across Yugoslavia about people dying of heart attack while watching the film, but none of them was ever confirmed.

Robert Eggers credited Leptirica as one of the films that influenced his adaptation of Nosferatu. He included the film in "Conjuring Nosferatu: Robert Eggers Presents", a nine-film program taking place at New York City's Film at Lincoln Center from 5 to 9 February 2025. In a press statement, Eggers called Leptirica "visually naïve and yet terrifying".

== See also ==
- Cinema of Serbia
- Cinema of Yugoslavia
- List of films based on Slavic mythology
- Vampire film

== Bibliography ==
- Glišić, Milovan (2021). Tales of Fear and Superstition. ISBN 979-8-7777-9059-0.
