= Joaquín Portillo =

Joaquín Portillo (26 February 1911 – 14 August 1994) was a Spanish actor and writer who was also known as 'Top'.

== Biography ==
Portillo was born in Madrid. He was an actor and writer, known for La fierecilla domada (1956), Uncle Hyacynth (1956) and The Man Who Wagged His Tail (1957). He died on 14 August 1994 in Madrid.
