= Thunderstorm (film) =

1956 British film by John Guillermin

- Theatrical release poster
- Directed by: John Guillermin
- Screenplay by: Daniel Mainwaring; George St. George
- Story by: George St. George
- Produced by: Binnie Barnes
- Starring: Carlos Thompson; Linda Christian; Charles Korvin
- Cinematography: Manuel Berenguer
- Edited by: Lee Doig
- Music by: Paul Misraki
- Production company: Hemisphere Pictures
- Distributed by: British Lion Films
- Release date: 22 June 1956
- Running time: 81 minutes
- Country: United Kingdom
- Language: English

Thunderstorm (also known as Tormenta) is a 1956 British drama film directed by John Guillermin and starring Carlos Thompson, Linda Christian, and Charles Korvin. It was made by British Lion Films.

== Plot summary ==
Maria Ramon is a mysterious beautiful girl discovered unconscious and alone on board a small damaged yacht at sea. A group of fishermen, including Diego Martinez, take Maria back to the nearest coastal Spanish fishing village for her to recover and offer to repair her small yacht.

All of the men in the village are infatuated with Maria, but the women view her with jealousy and suspicion, saying that she is a curse on their village and blaming her for the recent lack of fish on which the village solely relies. When Maria is attacked by a mob of village women tearing her hair and clothes and bruising her, the local Padre Flores saves her. The film ends with Maria quietly leaving by setting out to sea in her repaired small yacht with Diego watching from the small harbor.

== Cast ==
- Carlos Thompson as Diego Martinez
- Linda Christian as Maria Ramon
- Charles Korvin as Pablo Gardia
- Catharina Ferraz as Señora Martinez
- José Marco Davó as Padre Flores
- Garry Thorne as Miguel Gardea
- Tito Junco as Toro
- Erica Vaal as Juana
- Marco Davó as Padre Flores
- Félix de Pomés as Domingo Ribas
- Nestor M. Meana as Lalo
- Carlos Diaz Mendoza as Pedro
- Julia Caba Alba as Señora Hidalgo
- Isabel De Pomès as Señora Alvarez
- Conchita Bautista as Margo
- Amalia Iglesias as Dolores
- Manuel San Roman as Manuel Hidalgo

== Production ==
In April 1955, it was announced the film would be made by Hemisphere Productions, the company of Mike Frankovich. Filming would take place in London and Spain with Carlos Thompson and Linda Christian starring. Allied Artists were to distribute in the western hemisphere, British Lion in England and Columbia elsewhere. The script was written Geoffrey Holmes (the nom de plume for Daniel Mainwaring). The official producers were Binnie Barnes and Victor Pahlen. It was John Guillermin's return to features after directing TV for a time.

== Reception ==
The Monthly Film Bulletin wrote: "John Guillermin perceptively evokes the enclosed life of a Spanish fishing village and tells his simple tale with economy and precision, giving it a lifelike air of improvisation. The non-Spanish leading players fit convincingly into the background and give persuasive, well-contrasted performances. This is a refreshingly individual and unpretentious production."

Variety wrote: "[the] mood is a bit heavy, but goes with the story melodramatics."
