= Jesús de Aragón =

Spanish science fiction writer

Jesús de Aragón (1893–1973) was a Spanish writer of works in the fantasy and science fiction genres, sometimes with a gothic flair. He is often called the "Spanish Jules Verne" because of some thematic similarities he had with the French author, though Aragón's actual style was more heavily pulp-like, influenced by American pulps via Spanish-language translations of American series like The Shadow and Doc Savage books.

== Early life ==
Aragón was born in 1893 in Valsain, Spain. When Aragón was six years old, his father died, after which the family moved to Madrid. As a young man, Aragón was known to have beautiful handwriting, and found work as a professional scribe, copying whole books by hand. He went to college and studied to be a railway engineer.

== Writing career ==
In the 1920s, Aragón started writing articles for a small newspaper in Madrid, which were modestly successful.

In 1924, these articles brought him to the attention of a book editor who hired him to work on the manuscript for The Tower of the Seven Hunchbacks by Spanish novelist Emilio Carrere (which would later go on to become a film of the same name). The contract was ostensibly for error correction, though many believe that the novel had not been finished by Carrere—especially as the novel is mostly a cobbling together of previously written short stories by Carrere—and that substantial portions of it were in fact written by Aragón.

While Aragón wouldn't be credited for any creative work on the novel, this would still lead him to his own publishing contract, and in that same year he wrote two novels of his own in quick succession: Viaje al fondo del océano (Journey to the bottom of the ocean) and Cuarenta mil kilómetros a bordo del aeroplano "Fantasmo" (Forty Thousand Kilometers Aboard the Airplane Fantasma). As might be suggested by their titles, these works were somewhat derivative of two Jules Verne novels, Twenty Thousand Leagues Under the Seas and Around the World in Eighty Days, respectively, as well as other elements of Verne's Voyages extraordinaires.

He began working for the Spanish utility Fábrica de gas de Madrid (or "Gasómetro"), but still supplemented his income with writing work, sometimes publishing pulp stories under the pen name “Captain Sirius”—with martial-sounding pen names being common under fascist Francoist Spain—and sometimes writing academic textbooks on accounting under his own name.

His next novel wouldn't be published until five years later, Los piratas del aire, a Yellow Peril novel in which a villainous man named Abdahalla-Fan, along with his gorilla henchman, pilots a dragon-shaped war zeppelin to threaten all of India. He is defeated by the English hero Lord Ewerard Gleenmore.

He stopped writing in 1964, after which not much is known of him until his death in 1973. Several of his works were translated into French and Hungarian, but he has seldom, if ever, been translated into English.

== Bibliography ==
- 1924: Cuarenta mil kilómetros a bordo del aeroplano "Fantasma".
- 1924: Viaje al fondo del océano.
- 1929: Los piratas del aire.
- 1929: Una extraña aventura de amor en la luna.
- 1929: Nuevos sistemas de partida doble.
- 1929: La ciudad sepultada.
- 1930: El continente aéreo.
- 1931: La sombra blanca de Casarás.
- 1931: De noche sobre la ciudad prohibida.
- 1933: La destrucción de la Atlántida.
- 1933: Los caballeros de la montaña.
- 1933: El demonio del Cáucaso.
- 1934: Los cuatro mosqueteros del Zar.
- 1934: Crepúsculo en la noche roja (continuación de Los cuatro mosqueteros del Zar).
- 1941: Contabilidad de los comerciantes y empresas individuales.
- 1942: Enciclopedia moderna de contabilidad.
- 1959: Enciclopedia de administración, contabilidad y organización de empresas.
- 1964: Tratado de contabilidad analítica: Teoría y práctica de los costes standard, adaptación a los sistemas de contabilidad español y americano.
