= The Gifts of My Cousin Maria =

- Based on: "Zapis o darovima moje rođake Marije" by Momčilo Nastasijević
- Written by: Đorđe Kadijević
- Screenplay by: Đorđe Kadijević
- Directed by: Đorđe Kadijević
- Starring: Neda Spasojević; Ljiljana Krstić; Slobodan Perović
- Theme music composer: Zoran Hristić
- Country of origin: Yugoslavia
- Original language: Serbo-Croatian

Production
- Producer: Vladimir Papić
- Cinematography: Branko Perak
- Editor: Vuksan Lukovac
- Running time: 60 minutes
- Production company: Radio Television Belgrade

Original release
- Network: TV Belgrade
- Release: 1969

The Gifts of My Cousin Maria (Serbo-Croatian: Darovi moje rođake Marije / Дарови моје рођаке Марије) is a 1969 Yugoslav made-for-TV drama/horror film, directed by Serbian and Yugoslav director Đorđe Kadijević and based on the 1927 story "Zapis o darovima moje rođake Marije" (Serbian for 'Inscription about the Gifts of My Cousin Maria') by Serbian writer Momčilo Nastasijević. The film is notable as the first film in the history of Serbian and Yugoslav cinema to feature elements of the horror genre.

== Plot ==
Moma arrives to a small town to visit the house of his late cousin Maria. Through his narration it is revealeld that Maria died young, leaving behind her an old woman who adopted her after her mother's death and her wedding gifts (dowry). Upon hearing about Maria's death, Moma, although he was the only heir to her estate, delayed trip to her town. Finally, after several years, he was struck by inexplicable sadness about Maria's fate and decided to visit her estate.

At first the house seems empty, but then he meets Maria's adoptive mother. The woman is displeased with Moma's visit and advises him to leave, but nevertheless grants him access to the house. Moma explains that he wants only to learn something about Maria and to see Maria's dowry. In one room he finds a mirror covered with a peace of cloth. After removing the cloth and discovering that the mirror is cracked, he faints for a brief moment. The old woman tells him the story of Maria.

Maria was beautiful and courted by numerous young men. She became vain and started spending more and more time in front of the mirror. Several young men proposed to her, but she refused and ridiculed them. One of them committed suicide by hanging, which caused Maria to deeply regret her actions. She spent the next following years preparing her dowry, but no suitors came to the house. Her adoptive mother started to notice changes in Maria's behavior, but was unsure whether they were the result of falling into madness or of purification. One night the adoptive mother heard strange noises from Maria's room, and upon entering it found the mirror cracked and had visions of Maria with grey hair and in the strange state of blankness. It is revealed that Maria actually died that night.

After the woman finishes her story, Moma asks to spend the night in the house. The old woman retires to bed, and Moma unsuccessfully attempts to find a key to unlock the chest with Maria's dowry. While doing so, he hears noises and escapes the house, knocking down a burning candle while leaving. He leaves the house at dawn with only a pair of Maria's slippers. He hears church bells and sees townsfolk running towards Maria's inflamed house. He overhears several men discussing the fire. One of them believes that the fire must have been caused by an ember from the fireplace, but another one claims it is impossible as the house has been empty for seven years.

== Cast ==
- Neda Spasojević as Maria
- Ljiljana Krstić as Maria's adoptive mother
- Slobodan Perović as Moma

== See also ==
- Cinema of Serbia
- Cinema of Yugoslavia
