= The Tower of the Seven Hunchbacks =

The Tower of the Seven Hunchbacks or La Torre de los Siete Jorobados may refer to:

- The Tower of the Seven Hunchbacks (novel), a 1920 Spanish novel by Emilio Carrere
- The Tower of the Seven Hunchbacks (film), a 1944 Spanish film adaptation directed by Edgar Neville
