= Fantastic Night =

Fantastic Night (*German: Phantastische Nacht) is a novella by Austrian writer Stefan Zweig, first published in 1922. The work follows a wealthy Viennese aristocrat whose emotionally detached life is disrupted by a minor act of theft, leading to a sudden psychological and moral awakening.

The novella reflects Zweig’s characteristic interest in inner transformation, alienation, and the intensity of individual experience.

Fantastic Night may refer to:

- Fantastic Night (1942 film), a French fantasy film
- Fantastic Night (1943 film), a Spanish drama film
