= Miracle of Marcelino =

1955 film directed by Ladislao Vajda

- Spanish film poster
- Directed by: Ladislao Vajda
- Written by: José Maria Sanchez-Silva; Ladislao Vajda
- Based on: Marcelino by José María Sánchez-Silva
- Starring: Pablito Calvo; Rafael Rivelles; Antonio Vico; Juan Calvo; José Marco Davó
- Cinematography: Enrique Guerner
- Edited by: Julio Peña
- Music by: Pablo Sorozábal
- Distributed by: Chamartín
- Release date: 24 February 1955
- Running time: 91 minutes
- Country: Spain
- Language: Spanish
- Box office: 97,053,127 ₧

Miracle of Marcelino (Spanish: Marcelino, pan y vino, "Marcelino, bread and wine") is a 1955 Spanish film written by José Maria Sanchez-Silva, based on his novel, and directed by Ladislao Vajda. It stars Rafael Rivelles, and Juan Calvo (who also starred together as Don Quixote and Sancho Panza in the 1947 Spanish film version of Miguel de Cervantes' Don Quixote) with the young child star Pablito Calvo (no relation to Juan) as Marcelino. The musical score and theme song – sung in full during the action, rather than at the start of the film – are by Pablo Sorozábal.

The story, revised and modernised in both the book and film, is often claimed to date back to a medieval legend, one of many gathered together in a volume by Alfonso el Sabio. The film was a critical and commercial success, and other countries have produced versions of it.

== Plot ==
The story revolves around Marcelino, an orphan abandoned as a baby on the steps of a monastery in nineteenth-century Spain. The monks raise the child, and Marcelino grows into a rowdy young boy. He has been warned by the monks not to visit the monastery attic, where a "very big man who will take him away" lives, but he ventures upstairs anyway, sees the man and tears off back down the stairs.

At a festival, Marcelino causes havoc when he accidentally topples a pile of fruit and lets some animals loose. The new local mayor, a blacksmith whom the monks would not let adopt Marcelino because of his coarse behaviour, uses the incident as an excuse to try to shut down the monastery.

Given the silent treatment by the monks, Marcelino gathers up the courage to once again enter the attic, where he sees not a bogeyman, but a beautiful statue of Jesus Christ on the Cross. Remarking that the statue looks hungry, Marcelino steals some bread and wine and offers it to the statue, which comes to life, descends from the Cross, and eats and drinks what the boy has brought him. Marcelino realizes that the statue is Jesus, who becomes Marcelino's best friend and begins to give him religious instruction.

The monks suspect something when they notice bread and wine disappearing, and decide to spy on Marcelino. One day, Jesus notices that Marcelino is pensive and brooding instead of happy, and offers to reward his kindness. Marcelino answers: "I want only to see my mother, and to see Yours after that". Jesus cradles Marcelino to sleep in his arms, and Marcelino dies happy.

Brother Cookie witnesses the miracle through a crack in the attic door, and the monks burst in just in time to see the dead Marcelino bathed in a heavenly glow as Jesus reappears on the Cross. Marcelino is buried underneath the chapel and venerated by all who visit the now flourishing monastery-turned-shrine.

The main story is told in flashback by a monk (played by Fernando Rey) to a bedridden girl for inspiration. After finishing the story, the monk enters the now completely remodelled chapel in the monastery during Mass, where he joins the other monks in praying to the Jesus statue and to Marcelino's grave.

== Cast ==
- Pablito Calvo as Marcelino
- Rafael Rivelles as Padre Superior - Father Superior
- Antonio Vico as Fray Puerta - Brother Door
- Juan Calvo as Fray Papilla - Brother Cookie
- José Marco Davó as Pascual
- Juanjo Menéndez as Fray Giles
- Adriano Domínguez as Monk
- Mariano Azaña as Fray Malo - Brother Bad
- Joaquín Roa as Fray Talán - Brother Ding-Dong
- Isabel de Pomés as Manuel's Mother
- Carmen Carbonell as Alfonsa
- Carlota Bilbao as Nicolás' Wife
- José María Rodríguez as Monk
- Rafael Calvo as Don Emilio
- Francisco Arenzana as Nicolás
- Antonio Ferrandis as Monk
- José Prada as Roque
- Francisco Bernal as Pueblerino
- Julio F. Alymán as Esteban
- Rafael Cortés
- Rosita Valero as Young Mother
- Josefina Serratosa as Fruit Vendor
- Tina Vidal as Aldeana
- Ena Sedeño
- Blanca Sendino as Rosa
- Manuel Atalaya
- Adolfo López
- Rufino Inglés as Council Member
- Antonio Aullón
- Joaquín Vidriales as Young Father
- José Nieto as Civil Guard Commander
- Fernando Rey as Narrator Monk
- José María Oviés as Statue of Christ
- Matilde F. Vilariño as the voice of Marcelino

== Legacy ==
The film remains one of the most famous and successful Spanish films ever made, and one of the first Spanish films to become successful in the United States, where it was released on 22 October 1956.

Three key scenes of the film were filmed in La Alberca (Salamanca). Its Plaza Mayor serves as a stage for the initial scene, in which the narrator friar, Fernando Rey, goes down to the village to tell the sick child the story of Marcelino; the scene of the market, where Marcelino has just climbed into a cockpit after causing the stampede of a yoke of oxen; and the convent they pass in front of the Hermitage of San Blas of this locality. The scenes related to the convent were filmed in the chapel of the Cristo del Caloco in El Espinar (Segovia).

The figure of the Christ, however, does not correspond to that of the Caloco, but is a sculpture by the sculptor Antonio Simont and is currently on the altar of the Chapel of St. Teresa of the Convent of the Carmelites of Don Benito (Badajoz). It ended up there per the wishes of one of the sound engineers of the film, Miguel López Cabrera, whose sister was a nun in the convent.

== Remakes ==
- A Philippine remake of Miracle of Marcelino, under its original title, was released in 1979.
- An Italian remake, Marcellino, was produced in 1991 in colour, and was much less successful than the original film.
- In 2000, VIP Toons of Spain, PMMP and TF1 of France and Nippon Animation of Japan created the first TV series adaptation of the story, also titled Marcelino Pan y Vino after the original novel. The first 26-episode run (2000-2001) was adapted into several languages, including French, Spanish, Tagalog, Portuguese, and Italian, and became a success across Europe. An additional 26 episodes were made in 2004 and aired in Germany in 2006.
- The 2000 Mexican telenovela Rayito de luz is based on the book Marcelino, pan y vino.
- The film was adapted to Philippine television as the ABS-CBN religious teleserye May Bukas Pa, underwent two airing versions from the late 2000s to early 2010s which are cut from February 2, 2009 to February 5, 2010 on ABS-CBN and extended on its sister channel Jeepney TV from March 11 to December 5, 2013.
- A Mexican remake was released on 16 December 2010, with the basic storyline and framed by the Mexican Revolution of 1910.
- The 2023 Brazilian telenovela Amor Perfeito is also based on Marcelino, pan y vino.

== Awards ==
Won

- 1955 Cannes Film Festival
  - OCIC Award - Special Mention
  - Pablito Calvo - Special Mention
- 5th Berlin International Film Festival: Silver Bear

Nominated

- 1955 Cannes Film Festival: Palme d'Or
