= Black Siren =

Black Siren may refer to:

- Black Siren, a member of the Justice Guild of America
- Black Siren (Arrowverse), the alias of Earth-2's Laurel Lance in the Arrowverse
- The Black Siren, a 1947 Spanish film
