= Maria, Registered in Bilbao =

- Directed by: Ladislao Vajda
- Written by: José María Sánchez Silva; Luis de Diego; Ladislao Vajda
- Starring: Alberto Closas; Arturo Fernández; Nadia Gray
- Cinematography: Heinrich Gartner
- Edited by: Julio Peña
- Music by: Pablo Sorozábal
- Production company: Chamartín
- Distributed by: Chamartín
- Release date: 17 November 1960
- Running time: 90 minutes
- Country: Spain
- Language: Spanish

Maria, Registered in Bilbao (Spanish: María, matrícula de Bilbao) is a 1960 Spanish drama film directed by Ladislao Vajda and starring Alberto Closas, Arturo Fernández and Nadia Gray.

== Cast ==
- Alberto Closas as Enrique
- Arturo Fernández as Eduardo Vila
- Nadia Gray as Berta
- Javier Asin as Luiso
- María Rosa Salgado as Amparo
- Carlos Casaravilla as Urrutia
- José Marco Davó as Don Ángel
- Carlos Mendy as Rogelio
- Pepe Rubio as Muros
- Antonio Ferrandis as Paco 'El Sordo'
- Enrique Ávila as Bermeo
- Antonio Casas as Luis
- Mariano Azaña as Consignatario de Málaga
- Miguel Gila as Vendedor ambulante en Palma de Mallorca
- Félix Acaso as Marino traficante de drogas
- Pilar Gómez Ferrer as Sirvienta
- Manuel Fernández Sanz
- Pilar Sanclemente as Paloma
- María Carmen Cayetana as Mercedes
- Charles Vanel as El viejo

== Bibliography ==
- Bentley, Bernard. A Companion to Spanish Cinema. Boydell & Brewer, 2008.
