= Juan Pallejá =

Late Spanish cinematographer

- Born: 1889; Lleida, Spain
- Died: 1971 (aged 81–82); Barcelona, Spain
- Other name: Juan Palleja Ortiz
- Occupation: Film editor
- Years active: 1937-1969 (film)

Juan Pallejá (1889–1971) was a Spanish film editor. As well as editing feature films such as Malvaloca, Pallejá was noted for his work on documentaries.

== Selected filmography ==
- Malvaloca (1942)
- Traces of Light (1943)
- Fantastic Night (1943)
- Gentleman Thief (1946)
- The King's Mail (1951)
- The Pelegrín System (1952)
- Persecution in Madrid (1952)
- That Man in Istanbul (1968)

== Bibliography ==
- Crusells, Magi. Directores de cine en Cataluña: de la A a la Z. Edicions Universitat Barcelona, 2009.
