= Pablito Calvo =

Spanish actor (1948–2000)

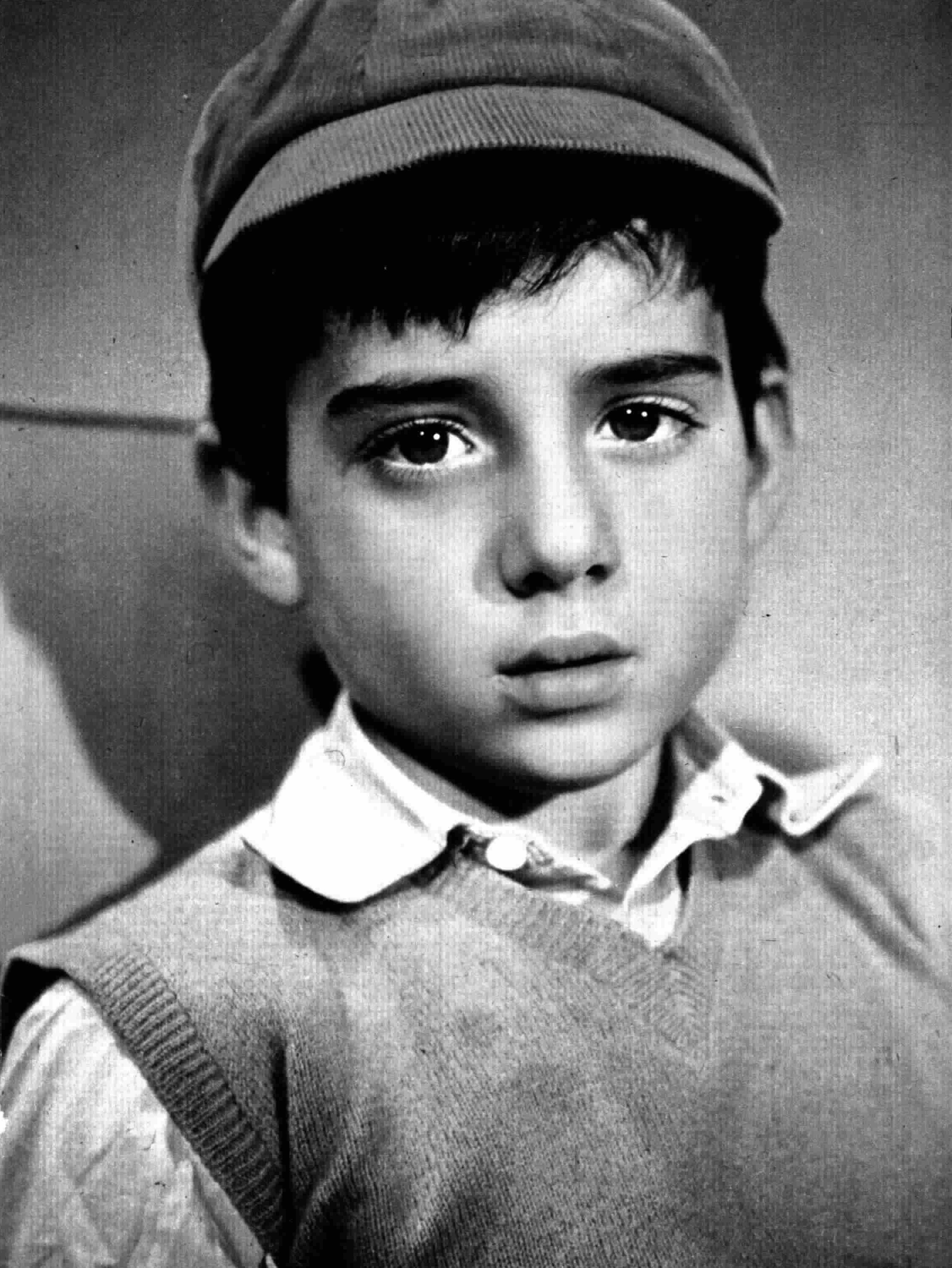
- Calvo in 1956
- Born: Pablo Calvo Hidalgo; 16 March 1948; Madrid, Spain
- Died: 1 February 2000 (aged 51); Alicante, Spain
- Years active: 1955–1963
- Spouse: Juana Olmedo (m. 1976)
- Children: 1

Pablo Calvo Hidalgo (16 March 1948 – 1 February 2000), better known as Pablito Calvo, was a Spanish child actor.

== Biography ==
After the international success of Marcelino, pan y vino, where he won a Cannes Film Festival award (1955), he became Spain's most famous child actor. He did five more films including Mi tío Jacinto (1956), Un ángel pasó por Brooklyn (1957), and Toto and Marcellino (1958) in Italy, with Totò.

Retired from acting at the age of 16 to become an industrial engineer later, he worked in tourism and promoting buildings in Torrevieja. Calvo sang in a few films, but his singing voice was always dubbed on screen in Spain by a woman named Matilde F. Vilariño.

Calvo married Juana Olmedo in 1976. They had one son. He died on 1 February 2000 from a brain aneurysm at the age of 51.

== Filmography ==
Year	Title	Role	Notes
1955	Marcelino pan y vino	Marcelino	
1956	Uncle Hyacynth	Pepote	
1957	The Man Who Wagged His Tail	Filipo	
1958	Totò e Marcellino	Marcellino Merini	
1960	Juanito	Juanito	
1961	Alerta en el cielo	Miguelito Ramos	
1962	Dos años de vacaciones	Brian	
1963	Barcos de papel		(final film role)

== See also ==
- Joselito
- Marisol

== Bibliography ==
- Holmstrom, John. The Moving Picture Boy: An International Encyclopaedia from 1895 to 1995, Norwich, Michael Russell, 1996, p. 264-265.
