= Adriano Domínguez =

Spanish actor (1920–2008)

Adriano Dominguez
- Born: Adriano Domínguez Fernández; 4 January 1920; León, Spain
- Died: 9 May 2008 (aged 88); León, Spain
- Occupation: Actor
- Years active: 1945-1994 (film)

Adriano Domínguez Fernández (4 January 1920 – 9 May 2008) was a Spanish film and television actor. He appeared in 150 films between 1945 and 1994. He survived to the terrorist act at California 47 café in 1979 by GRAPO. He died on 9 May 2008 at the age of 88 at Virgen del Camino nursing home in León.

== Selected filmography ==
- Mauricio o Una víctima del vicio (1940)
- Last Stand in the Philippines (1945) - Pineda
- The Princess of the Ursines (1947) - Jefe de corchetes
- Doña María the Brave (1948) - Príncipe Don Enrique
- Agustina of Aragon (1950)
- The Lioness of Castille (1951)
- Our Lady of Fatima (1951)
- The Seventh Page (1951) - Méndez
- Spanish Serenade (1952) - Andrés
- El encuentro (1952)
- Airport (1953) - Mendoza
- The Devil Plays the Flute (1953) - Jacinto
- Flight 971 (1953) - Hijo de la mujer enferma
- Two Paths (1954) - Teniente Ibarra
- High Fashion (1954) - Alfonso
- La patrulla (1954) - Soñador
- Miracle of Marcelino (1955) - Monk
- Nubes de verano
- Historias de la radio (1955)
- Uncle Hyacynth (1956) - Policía
- Horas de pánico (1957)
- El anónimo (1957)
- The Night Heaven Fell (1958) - Fernando
- Carlota (1958)
- Gayarre (1959) - Sabater
- Pasos de angustia (1959)
- Back to the Door (1959) - Fermín
- El indulto (1960) - Sargento Guardia Civil
- Peace Never Comes (1960)
- Alfonso XII and María Cristina (1960)
- Regresa un desconocido (1961) - Amigo de Juan
- The Colossus of Rhodes (1961)
- Plácido (1961)
- Tres de la Cruz Roja (1961)
- The Reprieve (1961)
- El amor de los amores (1962) - Doctor Acevedo
- Cerca de las estrellas (1962) - Antonio
- Teresa de Jesús (1962)
- The Mustard Grain (1962) - Médico
- Las doce sillas (1962)
- Occidente y sabotaje (1962)
- Queen of The Chantecler (1962)
- The Running Man (1963) - Civil Guard
- Tela de araña (1963) - Pinto
- Eva 63 (1963) - Carlos
- El camino (1963) - Dimas
- Aquella joven de blanco (1964) - Francois Soubirous
- La muerte silba un blues (1964) - Comisario Folch
- Jandro (1965) - Suárez
- Dos chicas locas, locas... (1965) - Leopoldo
- El cálido verano del Sr. Rodríguez (1965)
- Un vampiro para dos (1965) - Empleado Casa España Düsseldorf
- Television Stories (1965)
- Balearic Caper (1966)
- Culpable para un delito (1966) - Policía
- Fray Torero (1966) - Médico
- De barro y oro (1966) - Antonio
- I'll Kill Him and Return Alone (1967)
- El rostro del asesino (1967) - Pablo
- Club de solteros (1967)
- Pero... ¿en qué país vivimos? (1967) - Amigo de Antonio en la discográfica
- Cervantes (1967) - (uncredited)
- El turismo es un gran invento (1968) - Secretario del Ministro
- Uno a uno, sin piedad (1968)
- ¡Cómo sois las mujeres! (1968) - Goyo - marido de Julia
- La chica de los anuncios (1968) - Agente publicitario
- No le busques tres pies... (1968)
- Abuelo Made in Spain (1969) - Marido de Visitación
- Bohemios (1969)
- Pecados conyugales (1969) - Vélez
- Las nenas del mini-mini (1969) - Padre de Piluca
- Soltera y madre en la vida (1969) - Un juerguista
- A 45 revoluciones por minuto (1969) - Camarero
- Johnny Ratón (1969)
- Matrimonios separados (1969) - Comisario
- Con ella llegó el amor (1970)
- Golpe de mano (Explosión) (1970) - Teniente médico
- El abominable hombre de la Costa del Sol (1970) - Peña
- Tristana (1970) - Policía
- Los hombres las prefieren viudas (1970) - Luis
- El monumento (1970) - Médico
- Growing Leg, Diminishing Skirt (1970)
- Hembra (1970)
- Vente a Alemania, Pepe (1971) - Don Ramón Benítez
- Las ibéricas F.C. (1971) - Agustín Miranda, el arbitro
- La cera virgen (1972) - Fiscal
- La casa de las Chivas (1972) - Alonso
- Experiencia prematrimonial (1972) - Pepito
- God in Heaven... Arizona on Earth (1972)
- Flor de santidad (1973) - General
- Tarot (1973) - Doctor
- The Guerrilla (1973)
- El padrino y sus ahijadas (1974)
- Proceso a Jesús (1974) - Espectador ciego
- Cinco almohadas para una noche (1974) - Camarero
- Tocata y fuga de Lolita (1974) - Requejo
- Los muertos, la carne y el diablo (1974)
- Largo retorno (1975) - Martin
- La amante perfecta (1976)
- The Legion Like Women (1976)
- Señoritas de uniforme (1976) - Andrés
- Secuestro (1976) - Ramiro
- Sweetly You'll Die Through Love (1977)
- Pepito piscina (1978) - Don Marcelino
- Estimado Sr. juez... (1978) - El comisario
- Venus de fuego (1978)
- Father Cami's Wedding (1979)
- El día del presidente (1979) - Ministro de Trabajo
- Cinco tenedores (1980) - Los Monteros
- El alcalde y la política (1980) - Raimundo
- Los cántabros (1980) - Antistio
- Adiós, querida mamá (1980)
- La vendedora de ropa interior (1982)
- Fredy el croupier (1982) - Director casino
- Old Shirt to New Jacket (1982) - Secretario general de Falange
- Y del seguro... líbranos Señor! (1983)
- Christina y la reconversión sexual (1984) - Policía (uncredited)
- La hoz y el Martínez (1985)
- Una y sonada... (1985) - Gerardo
- Romanza final (Gayarre) (1986)
- Voyage to Nowhere (1986)
- Policía (1987) - Comisario Jefe
- Moros y cristianos (1987) - Rodríguez
- Amanece, que no es poco (1989)
- Mala yerba (1991) - Especulador (final film role)

== Bibliography ==
- Luis Mariano González. Fascismo, kitsch y cine histórico español, 1939-1953. Univ de Castilla La Mancha, 2009.
