= Amor Perfeito =

- Genre: Telenovela
- Created by: Duca Rachid; Júlio Fischer; Elisio Lopes Jr.
- Based on: Marcelino, pan y vino by José María Sánchez-Silva
- Written by: Dora Castellar; Duba Elia; Mariani Ferreira
- Directed by: André Câmara
- Starring: Camila Queiroz; Diogo Almeida; Mariana Ximenes; Thiago Lacerda
- Theme music composer: Chico César
- Opening theme: "O Amor é um Ato Revolucionário" by Sandy
- Country of origin: Brazil
- Original language: Portuguese
- No. of seasons: 1
- No. of episodes: 161

Production
- Producer: Isabel Ribeiro
- Production company: Estúdios Globo

Original release
- Network: TV Globo
- Release: 20 March – 22 September 2023

Amor Perfeito (English: Perfect Love) is a Brazilian telenovela produced and broadcast by TV Globo, that aired from 20 March to 22 September 2023. Inspired by José María Sánchez-Silva's 1953 novel Marcelino, pan y vino, the telenovela is written by Duca Rachid, Júlio Fischer and Elisio Lopes Jr. It stars Camila Queiroz, Diogo Almeida, Mariana Ximenes and Thiago Lacerda.

== Cast ==
- Camila Queiroz as Maria Elisa Rubião "Marê"
- Diogo Almeida as Orlando Gouveia
- Mariana Ximenes as Gilda Torquato Rubião
- Thiago Lacerda as Gaspar Evaristo
- Daniel Rangel as Júlio Medrado
- Carmo Dalla Vecchia as Érico Requião
- Juliana Alves as Wanda Pacheco
- Bukassa Kabengele as Silvio Pacheco
- Carol Castro as Darlene Nogueira
- Allan Souza Lima as Father João
- Paulo Betti as Anselmo Evaristo
- Zezé Polessa as Cândida Evaristo
- Ana Cecília Costa as Verônica Medrado
- Isabel Fillardis as Aparecida Madureira
- Alan Rocha as Antônio Madureira
- Lucy Ramos as Lívia Albuquerque
- Beto Militani as Ciro Albuquerque
- Maria Gal as Neiva Batista
- Tonico Pereira as Friar Leão
- Babu Santana as Friar Severo
- Tony Tornado as Friar Tomé
- Chico Pelúcio as Father Diógenes
- Bernardo Berro as Father Donato "Papinha"
- Antônio Pitanga as Friar Vitório
- Jorge Florêncio as Emanuel / Jesus
- Kênia Barbara as Lucília Gouveia
- Bruno Montaleone as Ivan Evaristo
- Iza Moreira as Tânia Batista
- João Fernandes as Justino Madureira
- Carol Badra as Ione
- Gustavo Arthiddoro as Ademar
- Genézio de Barros as Dr. Ítalo
- Bárbara Sut as Sônia Madureira
- Cyda Moreno as Celeste
- Mestre Ivamar as Popó Batista
- Glicério do Rosário as Turíbio
- Cristiane Amorim as Catarina
- Raquel Karro as Elza
- Bruno Quixotte as Odilon
- Levi Asaf as Marcelino / Ângelo Gouveia Rubião
- Vitória Pabst as Clarinha Nogueira
- Ygor Marçal as Manoel Madureira
- Valentina Melleu as Aninha
- Davi Queiroz as Tobias Albuquerque

=== Guest stars ===
- Paulo Gorgulho as Leonel Rubião
- Karen Marinho as Maria Eugênia Rubião
- Analu Prestes as Olímpia
- Bruce Gomlevsky
- Breno De Felippo as Ronaldo
- Kyvilin Pádilha as Nadir
- Pedro David as Rodrigo

== Production ==
In May 2022, Amor Perfeito was approved by TV Globo, under the working title Marcelino. Production began in January 2023 with casting, costume making, and the construction of the fictional São Jacinto set town at Globo Studios. Filming began that same month in São Paulo, with locations at Luz Station, Independence Park, and Martinelli Building. On 17 February 2023, the first teaser for the telenovela was released.

== Ratings ==
Season	Episodes	First aired		Last aired		Avg. viewers (points)
Season	Episodes	Date	Viewers (points)	Date	Viewers (points)	Avg. viewers (points)
1	161	20 March 2023	19.3	22 September 2023	20.1	19.5
