= The King's Mail =

- Directed by: Ricardo Gascón
- Written by: Rafael J. Salvia; Ricardo Gascón
- Produced by: José Carreras Planas
- Starring: Cesare Danova; Juana Soler; Isabel de Pomés
- Cinematography: Aldo Giordani
- Edited by: Juan Pallejá
- Music by: Juan Durán Alemany
- Production company: PECSA Films
- Distributed by: Universal Films Española
- Release date: 19 February 1951
- Running time: 100 minutes
- Country: Spain
- Language: Spanish

The King's Mail (Spanish:Correo del rey) is a 1951 Spanish historical adventure film directed by Ricardo Gascón and starring Cesare Danova, Juana Soler and Isabel de Pomés. It was made at the Orphea Studios in Barcelona.

== Cast ==
- Cesare Danova as Marcos de Malta
- Juana Soler as Leonor de Turón
- Isabel de Pomés as Cecilia de Turón
- Félix de Pomés as Félix Picardo de Peñafiel
- Jacinto San Emeterio as Marqués de Posa
- Robert Le Vigan as Peabody
- Emilio Sancho as Tomás - marinero
- Ramón Martori as Sir William Douglas Cleophane
- Luis Villasiul as Anselmo - mayordomo
- Pepita Fornés as Doña Constancia de Turón
- Juan Eulate as Ministro de la Guerra
- Modesto Cid as Posadero español
- Francisco Gayán
- Antonia Manau
- Josefina Tapias
- Alfredo Herrero
- Luis Induni as Teniente Smith
- Gonzalo Medel as Almirante Nelson
- Ricardo Martín
- Eduardo Ordóñez
- Joaquín Regález
- Juan Moreno Rigo
- Camino Delgado
- Isabel Marigot
- César Pombo
- Fortunato García
- Rafael Calvo as Don Carlos de Turón
- Antonio Manau

== Bibliography ==
- Eva Woods Peiró. White Gypsies: Race and Stardom in Spanish Musical Films. U of Minnesota Press, 2012.
