= The Mayor of Zalamea (1954 film) =

- Directed by: José Gutiérrez Maesso
- Written by: Pedro Calderón de la Barca (play); Manuel Tamayo; José Gutiérrez Maesso
- Starring: Maunel Luna; Alfredo Mayo; Isabel de Pomés
- Cinematography: Sebastián Perera
- Edited by: Antonio Ramírez de Loaysa
- Music by: Juan Quintero
- Production company: CIFESA
- Distributed by: CIFESA
- Release date: 25 January 1954
- Running time: 80 minutes
- Country: Spain
- Language: Spanish

The Mayor of Zalamea (Spanish:El alcalde de Zalamea) is a 1954 Spanish historical drama film directed by José Gutiérrez Maesso and starring Manuel Luna, Alfredo Mayo and Isabel de Pomés. The film is an adaptation of the Golden Age play The Mayor of Zalamea by Pedro Calderón de la Barca.

This version of the play is remembered for Rey's "solemn" interpretation of Felipe II. According to José Lera, quoting the director himself, "Maesso, as director, had to fight "against the bombast, the flawed acting, the poor quality of the dialogue, the bad setting," although he has managed to give a natural aspect to the drama"

== Plot ==
A company of soldiers under the command of Captain Álvaro de Ataide (Alfredo Mayo) arrives in the town of Zalamea de la Serena, in Badajoz, because of the war in Portugal. The captain of noble descent is staying in the house of a rich farmer, Pedro Crespo (Manuel Luna), mayor of the town, whose daughter Isabel (Isabel de Pomés) Don Álvaro seduces. Pedro Crespo tries to remedy the situation and for Don Álvaro to marry Isabel, but Don Álvaro rejects her for not being of the nobility. This contempt wounds the honor of Pedro's entire family. Even without having jurisdiction over the soldier, Pedro Crespo orders him to be arrested and has Don Álvaro executed by hanging him. Finally King Don Felipe II (Fernando Rey), reviews the mayor's decision, ratifies it and appoints Pedro Crespo perpetual mayor of Zalamea.

== Cast ==
- Manuel Luna as Pedro Crespo
- Alfredo Mayo as Don Álvaro
- Isabel de Pomés as Isabel
- José Marco Davó as Don Lope de Figueroa
- Alberto Bové as Rebolledo
- Mario Berriatúa as Juan
- Juanita Azores as Chispa
- María Fernanda D'Ocón as Inés
- José Orjas as Don Mendo
- Fernando Rey as El Rey
- Casimiro Hurtado
- José Prada
- Francisco Bernal
- Arturo Marín
- Juan Vázquez
- Manuel Guitián
- Mariano Alcón
- Luis Torrecilla
- Mario Guerrero

== Bibliography ==
- Mira, Alberto. The A to Z of Spanish Cinema. Rowman & Littlefield, 2010.
