= The Mayor of Zalamea =

Play by Pedro Calderón de la Barca

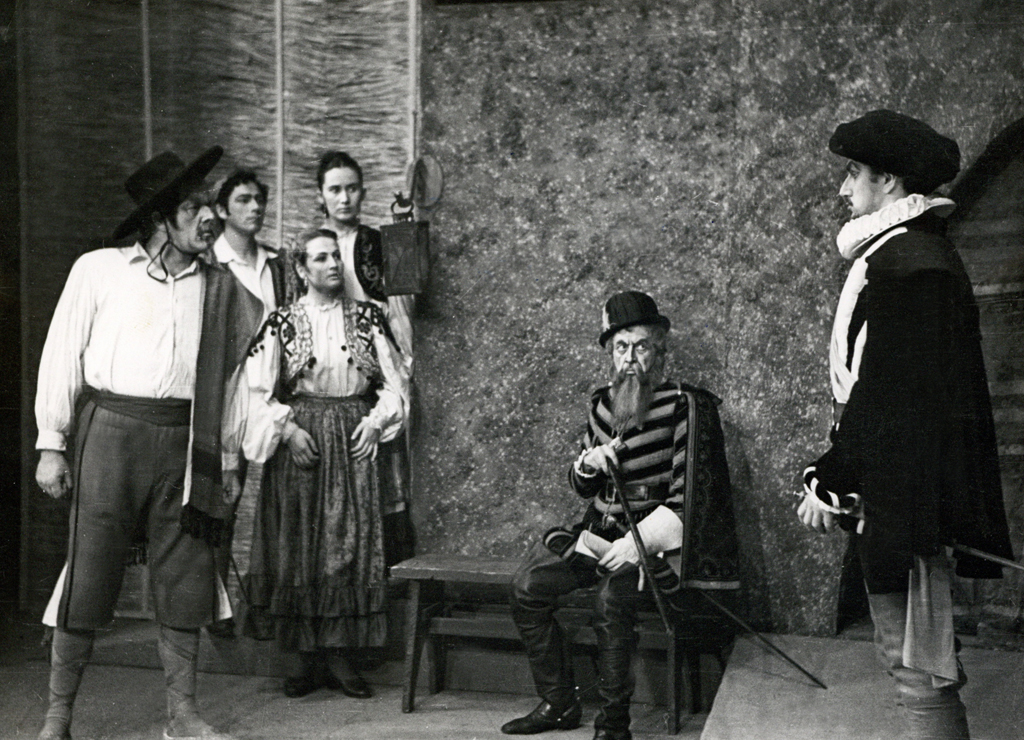
The play by the Maribor Slovene National Theatre in 1952

The Mayor of Zalamea (Spanish: El Alcalde de Zalamea) is a play written by Pedro Calderón de la Barca (1600–1681) during the Golden Age of Spanish drama. It was probably written in 1636. It is likely the play had its premiere on May 12, 1636 in the court of Philip IV of Spain. It pays homage to a play by the same name by Lope de Vega, which it surpassed in fame through its superior character development, becoming one of the most well-known plays of its time. This play has three acts that explore the power of the self-made man against the political authorities of 17th century Spanish society, and the continuous struggle between corporate and individual honor. The play was first staged on Broadway in 1945 at the Majestic Theatre with a cast led by Herbert Berghof under the direction of James Light.

== Characters ==
=== Major characters ===
- Pedro Crespo – An old, wealthy farmer who worked hard for his wealth but is not of noble blood. He places his honor and God above everything, but his principles come into question upon his appointment to the position of mayor after he is disgraced by the rape of his daughter.
- Don Lope of Figueroa – General of the troop that stopped at Zalamea. This proud general has the tendency to make extreme oaths that he does not necessarily think through. He is the symbol of the military throughout the play.
- Don Alvaro of Ataide – Captain under Don Lope. He is known to be a womanizer, and abuses the hospitality of Pedro Crespo by creating commotion during his stay. Later, after the other troops leave, he stays behind and attacks Isabel, raping her. He is captured by Juan and then executed by Pedro Crespo.
- Isabel – Daughter of Pedro Crespo. She is aware of the danger the soldiers pose to her honor, and knows to uphold her virtue in order to preserve her family's honor. She is known for being very beautiful. In the end, she decides to go to a convent.
- Juan – Son of Pedro Crespo. Decides to join Don Lope's regiment yet returns when he hears a damsel in distress. He injures the attacker, only to realize that it is Don Alvaro and the damsel his sister.
- Rebolledo – Soldier serving under Don Alvaro. He helps Don Alvaro fake a fight in the presence of Ines in order to draw her out. He hopes to gain gambling privileges in partnership with La Chispa. However, he feels guilty for tricking the kind Ines after she helps him run from the fake fight.
- La Chispa – Mistress to Rebolledo. Her name literally translates as "The Spark". She hopes to gain gambling privileges in partnership with Rebolledo. She has the reputation among the soldiers for being a whore.

=== Minor characters ===
- Ines – Cousin of Isabel
- Don Mendo – Nobleman who is very poor yet tries to maintain the illusion of wealth. He hopes to woo Isabel and marry into her family for money.
- Nuño – Servant to Don Mendo
- Philip II of Spain

== Summary ==
=== Act I ===
A group of soldiers under Don Lope of Figueroa stops in the town of Zalamea, where the captain of the troop, Don Alvaro, is housed by the wealthy farmer Pedro Crespo. Hearing about the military's plans, Pedro Crespo decides to hide his daughter and niece in the attic, knowing that when the military comes around, honors are often ruined. However, Don Alvaro arrives with the intention of seeing Isabel, for he has heard the rumors of her beauty. Housed by Pedro Crespo, Don Alvaro devises a plan to fake a fight with Rebolledo and have him run away into the attic in order to catch a glimpse at Isabel and ascertain for himself whether the rumors about her beauty are true. The plan works, although the ruckus brings the attention of the general, Don Lope of Figueroa. Don Lope decides to stay at Pedro's house, and they develop an instant dislike for each other. Don Lope brashly declares that he would hang anyone who might bring any slight harm to his men. Pedro makes the same vow for anyone who would besmirch his honor, stating that honor is the connection to the soul and thus to God. They part ways, each thinking the other overtly stubborn.

=== Act II ===
The day Alvaro marches his men out of Zalamea, he decides to leave them under the supervision of a subordinate and return for Isabel. Juan has also decided to depart and become a soldier under Don Lope's forces. Having come out of the house with her family to send her brother off, Isabel is taken by the captain; a few of his men help and prevent Pedro Crespo and Ines from helping her. Juan, having not gone far, hears the cries of anguish and returns to assist, not knowing that it is his father or sister that are being attacked.

=== Act III ===
Isabel, who has been raped by Don Alvaro, wanders around until she finds her father. She tells him what happened to her, including how her brother injured Don Alvaro. Both desire death, knowing that their honor is ruined, but Pedro brings his daughter back to town. Once there, Pedro discovers that he has been elected mayor and that King Philip II is to arrive in town the next day. He also finds out that the soldiers are still there in town trying to mend Don Alvaro's wound. Pedro, as a father, goes to Don Alvaro and begs him to marry his daughter, offering any amount of his fortune he desires as dowry. Enraged, Don Alvaro refuses. Pedro arrests Don Alvaro, deciding to take matters legally. Pedro, acting as mayor, also arrests Juan upon his return for his assault on an officer. Hearing of Don Alvaro's arrest, Don Lope returns to Zalamea prepared to storm the jail. At this moment, the King arrives. After being told the facts, the King decides that the law has been followed, but that the accused must be tried elsewhere. Pedro then reveals that justice has already taken place, opening the door to show that Don Alvaro has already been executed by garrote. Pedro argues that it does not matter who executes a man that is to die anyway, a logic with which the King cannot argue. Pedro is then appointed permanent mayor of Zalamea. Juan is pardoned and returns to Don Lope's army. Isabel decides to go to a convent in order to restore her honor with God.

== Themes and motifs ==
=== Honor ===
==== Self-made man versus nobleman ====
- Pedro Crespo remains a farmer of low blood regardless of how wealthy or virtuous he is. Pedro Crespo is not a "Don", the prefix for a nobleman. He chooses not to buy his way into the title, for everyone knows who he is already and would know how he came to the title.
- Don Mendo has the title of nobility, even though he is poor and refuses to work. His title is a joke amongst the town and shows how having such a title means little anymore.

==== Tension between the civilians and the military ====
- Pedro Crespo represents the civilian. His vows are to protect the honor of the individual, for it is their only connection to God.
  - Pedro also maintains the honor of justice as the mayor when he chooses to arrest both Don Alvaro and his son.
  - Pedro and his children do not hesitate to die if they must in order to restore their honor with God.
- Don Lope shows the honor the military has to the King. His vows are to be honored as well, although his might be more rash than that of Pedro's.
  - The military has the right to be housed wherever they choose, whether the civilians agree to this or not. Civilians have no right to refuse the military, thus increasing tension when they stop in town.

== Adaptations ==
Actor-playwright Leo Ditrichstein translated the play into English in 1917, but it proved a commercial failure. The production was notable for providing William Powell with an early stage role as Captain Don Alvaro. Adrian Mitchell's adaptation was staged by the National Theatre in 1981, with Michael Bryant in the lead role.

The play has been turned into several films including a 1920 German silent version The Mayor of Zalamea, and a 1954 Spanish sound film The Mayor of Zalamea. An East German version, The Mayor of Zalamea, was released in 1956.
