= The Man Who Wagged His Tail =

- Directed by: Ladislao Vajda
- Written by: István Békeffy; Ottavio Alessi; Ugo Guerra; Gian Luigi Rondi; José Santugini; Ladislao Vajda
- Starring: Peter Ustinov
- Cinematography: Heinrich Gärtner
- Music by: Bruno Canfora
- Release date: 1957

The Man Who Wagged His Tail (Spanish: Un ángel pasó por Brooklyn, Italian: Un angelo è sceso a Brooklyn, also known as An Angel Over Brooklyn and An Angel Passed Over Brooklyn) is a 1957 Spanish-Italian fantasy-comedy film directed by Ladislao Vajda. It was entered into the competition at the 23rd edition of the Venice Film Festival.

== Plot ==
Mr. Bozzi is the owner and lessor of many apartments and houses in Brooklyn's immigrant communities. He is a stubborn upstart who is only interested in his own profit and has no compassion for his tenants, who are often poor and in need. To prevent beggars from knocking or ringing his bell, he has trained himself to make dog noises. When one day a fairy tale seller appears to him, she curses him into a dog that only human love can transform back. Bozzi, pushed around, hungry, unwanted, experiences life as merciless and cold. Pursued by other dogs, chased away by people with whom he can no longer communicate, he roams the streets until he meets the boy Tonino, who takes care of him. The two become friends, and when some thugs beat up little Tonino, he jumps on the thugs to protect Tonino. Through this act of selflessness, Bozzi transforms back into human form. The inner transformation endures: from now on, Bozzi is understanding and friendly.

== Cast ==
- Peter Ustinov: Lawyer Pozzi
- Pablito Calvo: Tonino
- Aroldo Tieri: Bruno Lo Banco
- Maurizio Arena: Alfonso
- Franca Tamantini: Alfonso's girlfriend
- Silvia Marco: Giulia
- Isabel de Pomés: Paolina
- Carlos Casaravilla: Hobo
- José Marco Davó: Judge
- Renato Chiantoni: Judge's usher
- Dolores Bremón: Old lady
- Juan de Landa:Butcher
- José Isbert: Pietrino
- Julia Caba Alba: Owner of the restaurant
- Enrique Diosdado: Cop
- Carlo Pisacane: Tramp
