= Juanito (film) =

1960 film

- Film poster
- Directed by: Fernando Palacios
- Written by: Hans Bertram; Wolf Neumeister
- Produced by: Heinz Neubert
- Cinematography: Ricardo Torres
- Music by: Augusto Algueró
- Release date: 1960
- Running time: 97 minute
- Countries: Spain; West Germany; Argentina
- Language: Spanish

Juanito also known as Viva Juanito! is a 1960 Argentine, Spanish, West German international co-production film set during the Mexican Revolution.

== Cast ==
- Pablito Calvo - Juanito
- Georg Thomalla - Paddy
- Sabine Bethmann - Carmencita
- Hans von Borsody - Tom
- Pilar Cansino - Luisa
- Ángel Ortiz - Pedrillo
- José Marco Davó- General Vegas
- Antonio Casas - President Meza
- Alfredo Mayo - Colonel Cuesta
- Félix Fernández - Doctor Agapito
