= Félix de Pomés =

Spanish actor, fencer

- Born: 5 February 1889; Barcelona, Spain
- Died: 17 July 1969 (aged 77); Barcelona, Spain
- Occupations: Actor, fencer
- Years active: 1928–1967

Félix de Pomés (5 February 1889 – 17 July 1969) was a Spanish footballer, fencer and film actor. In football, he represented Catalonia and played for clubs including FC Barcelona and RCD Espanyol in the 1910s, during the sport's amateur era in the country. He competed at the 1924 and 1928 Summer Olympics in fencing. Later, he appeared in 72 films between 1928 and 1967.

His daughter was the actress Isabel de Pomés.

== Selected filmography ==
- The Great Adventuress (1928) - Teddy Bill
- Der Henker (1928)
- The Secret Courier (1928) - Norbert de la Môle
- The Smuggler's Bride of Mallorca (1929) - Polizeileutnant de Roya
- High Treason (1929) - Nimirski
- Doña mentiras (1930) - Robero Deval
- El secreto del doctor (1930) - Richard Garson
- Toda una vida (1930) - John Ashmore
- La fiesta del diablo (1931) - Mark Stone
- Sombras del circo (1931) - Nick Pogli
- Body and Soul (1931) - Comandante Knowles
- Esclavas de la moda (1931) - David Morton
- Mamá (1931) - Mauricio
- Pax (1932)
- Alala (1934)
- Doña Francisquita (1934)
- Rataplán (1935)
- Nuevos ideales (1936) - El industrial
- Hombres contra hombres (1937)
- Aurora de esperanza (1937) - Juan
- Liberación (1937)
- Las cinco advertencias de Satanás (1938)
- Usted tiene ojos de mujer fatal (1939)
- El deber (1939)
- Pilar Guerra (1941)
- Vidas cruzadas (1942) - Ricardo
- La patria chica (1943) - Míster Blay
- Santander, la ciudad en llamas (1944) - Don Pedro Bárcenas
- The Tower of the Seven Hunchbacks (1944) - Don Robinson de Mantua
- ¡Culpable! (1945) - Director del penal
- Ramsa (1946)
- Noche sin cielo (1947) - Esteban
- Don Juan de Serrallonga (1949) - Carlos de Torrellas
- Life in Shadows (1949) - Sr. Durán
- Doce horas de vida (1949) - Andrés
- Peace (1949) - Comandante en jefe vencido
- A Thief Has Arrived (1950)
- Child of the Night (1950) - Barrière
- El centauro (1950)
- The King's Mail (1951) - Félix Picardo de Peñafiel
- The Evil Forest (1951) - Klingsor
- María Morena (1951) - Juan Montoya
- Ley del mar (1952)
- Younger Brother (1953)
- Eleven Pairs of Boots (1954) - Quijano
- He Died Fifteen Years Ago (1954) - Jefe de policía
- The Island Princess (1954) - Guanazteml
- The Other Life of Captain Contreras (1955) - Marqués del Darro
- Marta (1955)
- El hombre que veía la muerte (1955)
- The Cock Crow (1955) - Obispo
- Thunderstorm (1956) - Domingo Ribas
- The Pride and the Passion (1957) - Bishop
- El aventurero (1957) - Inspector Gomez
- Aquellos tiempos del cuplé (1958) - Coronel Jacinto
- La vida por delante (1958) - Padre de Josefina
- La muralla (1958)
- Habanera (1958)
- El Salvador (1959)
- El redentor (1959)
- Ten Ready Rifles (1959) - Coronel García Zapata
- John Paul Jones (1959) - French Chamberlain
- La vida alrededor (1959) - Padre de Josefina
- College Boarding House (1959) - Don Juan
- Solomon and Sheba (1959) - Egyptian General (uncredited)
- Quanto sei bella Roma (1959)
- Muerte al amanecer (1959)
- La rana verde (1960)
- King of Kings (1961) - Joseph of Arimathea
- La spada del Cid (1962)
- Rogelia (1962) - Duque
- El diablo también llora (1965)
- Lost Command (1966) - Aged Speaker
- Una historia de amor (1967)
