= Old Shirt to New Jacket =

- Spanish film poster
- Spanish: De camisa vieja a chaqueta nueva
- Directed by: Rafael Gil
- Written by: Fernando Vizcaíno Casas
- Produced by: Francisco Mas
- Starring: José Luis López Vázquez; Manolo Codeso; Antonio Garisa
- Cinematography: José F. Aguayo
- Edited by: José Luis Matesanz
- Music by: Gregorio García Segura
- Production company: Manuel Salvador
- Release date: 1982
- Country: Spain
- Language: Spanish

Old Shirt to New Jacket (Spanish: De camisa vieja a chaqueta nueva) is a 1982 Spanish comedy film directed by Rafael Gil and starring José Luis López Vázquez, Manolo Codeso and Antonio Garisa.

== Cast ==
- José Luis López Vázquez as Manolo Vivar de Alda
- Manolo Codeso as Alfonsiño Corcheiro
- Antonio Garisa as governor
- María Casanova as Carmiña
- Charo López as María Antonia Brillas
- Agustín González as Daniel Fojardo
- Fernando Sancho as Cónsul alemán
- Emilio Gutiérrez Caba as Enrique Carrasco
- Fernando Delgado as Eufrasio
- Manuel Zarzo as José Alberto Vidal
- Maite Pardo as Doña Salvadora
- Alejandro de Enciso as Don Alejandro
- Ira Alonso as Monique
- Félix Dafauce as Don Florencio
- Emiliano Redondo as Father Llaneza
- Adriano Domínguez as Secretary General of Falange
- Antonio Vico as Manolo's son
- Flavia Zarzo as Carmen
- Milagros Ponti as Hilda
- Alejandra Grepi as Begoña
- Juan José Otegui as Alcalde
- Charo Moreno
- Valentín Gascón as Pedro
- Jacinto San Emeterio
- Alberto Fernández as bishop
- Luis Barbero as Víctor
- Manuel Gil
- Luis Rico
- Fernando Vizcaíno Casas as falangist
- Ángel Palomino as policeman
- Marcelo Arroita-Jáuregui
