= Traces of Light =

- Film poster
- Directed by: Rafael Gil
- Written by: Wenceslao Fernández Flórez (novel and screenplay)
- Starring: Antonio Casal; Isabel de Pomés
- Cinematography: Alfredo Fraile
- Edited by: Juan Pallejá
- Music by: Juan Quintero
- Release date: 22 March 1943
- Running time: 76 minutes
- Country: Spain
- Language: Spanish

Traces of Light (Spanish: Huella de luz) is a 1943 Spanish comedy film directed by Rafael Gil. It is based on a novel by Wenceslao Fernández Flórez.

== Plot ==
Octavio Saldaña is a poor young dreamer who lives with his elderly mother and is an office worker at Manufacturas Sánchez-Bey. Mr. Bey rewards Octavio for his work by inviting him to spend a few days at a spa. There Octavio meets Lelly, daughter of a cloth manufacture, and to impress her he decides to pass himself off as a millionaire.

== Cast ==
- Isabel de Pomés as Lelly Medina
- Antonio Casal as Octavio Saldaña
- Juan Espantaleón as Sánchez Bey
- Camino Garrigó as Madre de Octavio
- Juan Calvo as Mike
- Fernando Freyre de Andrade as Moke
- Mary Delgado as Rosario
- Nicolás D. Perchicot as Mayordomo
- Ramón Martori as Medina
- Julio Infiesta as Jacobito
- José Prada as Cañete
- Alejandro Nolla as Gerente del hotel
- Ana María Campoy as Isabel
- Francisco Hernández as Don Eduardo
- Joaquín Torréns as Conserje
- Fernando Porredón as Emilio

== Bibliography ==
- Bentley, Bernard P. E. (2008). A Companion to Spanish Cinema. Boydell & Brewer Ltd. ISBN 978-1-85566-176-9.
