= Anita Farra =

Italian stage and film actress

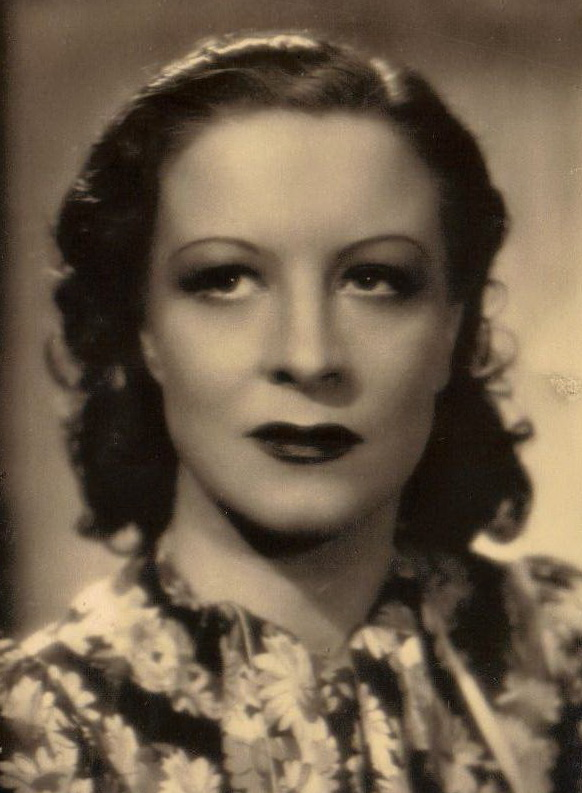
- Farra, c. 1940s
- Born: 15 July 1905; Venice, Kingdom of Italy
- Died: 4 August 2008 (aged 103); Predappio, Forlì-Cesena, Italy
- Occupation: Actress
- Years active: 1932–1975 (film)

Anita Farra (15 July 1905 – 4 August 2008) was an Italian stage and film actress. She appeared in around forty films during her career, generally in small or supporting roles, such as that in The Siege of the Alcazar (1940). Farra was also a noted voice actor, dubbing foreign films for release in Italy. She made a number of films in Spain.

== Selected filmography ==
- The Knight of San Marco (1939)
- The Faceless Voice (1939)
- The Siege of the Alcazar (1940)
- Pirates of Malaya (1941)
- The King of England Will Not Pay (1941)
- A Woman Has Fallen (1941)
- The Black Siren (1947)

== Bibliography ==
- Cardullo, Bert. André Bazin and Italian Neorealism. A&C Black, 2011.
