= Ward (1973 film) =

1973 television film directed by Đorđe Kadijević

- Serbo-Croatian: Štićenik
- Based on: "Mihael i njegov rođak" by Filip David
- Written by: Filip David; Đorđe Kadijević
- Directed by: Đorđe Kadijević
- Starring: Milan Caci Mihailović; Branko Pleša; Dušan Janićijević; Toma Kuruzović
- Music by: Milan Tričković
- Country of origin: Yugoslavia
- Original language: Serbo-Croatian

Production
- Cinematography: Branko Ivatović
- Editor: Neva Paskulović Habić
- Running time: 46 minutes

Original release
- Network: Radio Television Belgrade
- Release: March 29, 1973

Ward (Serbo-Croatian: Štićenik / Штићеник, lit. 'Protegé') is a 1973 Yugoslav made-for-TV arthouse horror film directed by Serbian and Yugoslav director Đorđe Kadijević and based on the story "Mihael i njegov rođak" (Serbian for 'Michael and His Cousin') by Serbian writer Filip David. The film is the first in Kadijević's mini-series Ciklus: Fantastika (Cycle: Fantasy).

The film centers around a young man trying to find refuge in a mental hospital while being chased by a mysterious pursuer. Kadijević described the film as "not a typical representative of the horror genre", but as "a film thematically related to fantasy [...] in which a more psychological approach towards the subject matter is evident".

== Plot ==
A young man runs through the wasteland, fleeing from an unknown pursuer wearing a black cloak and hat. While running, he passes by a fallen tree. He arrives in front of a mental hospital and begs to be let in. He introduces himself to the doctor as Mihael, but refuses to provide further information about himself or his stalker. He rejects the doctors' suggestions that he may be mentally ill and believes that he does not need treatment, but rather protection from his stalker. Although the doctor is skeptical at first, he starts to believe Mihael because he himself noticed, or thinks he noticed, someone following the young man to the hospital.

Doctor's suspicions are confirmed when the hospital janitor notices the pursuer in the hospital yard. After spotting the stalker for the second time, the janitor confronts him, and after violently attacking the janitor, the stalker leaves. While taking a walk through a foggy landscape, the doctor encounters Mihael's stalker, who presents himself as the young man's guardian. He calls Mihael "sick" and demands that Mihael be returned to him, but the doctor ignores his request, believing that Mihael needs psychiatric treatment and doubting the stalker's motives.

Mihael's paranoia seemingly worsens – he becomes scared of the nurses and draws the fallen tree he ran past on the wall of his room. Other patients grow suspicious about Mihael and demand to be protected from the "madman", and one of the medics notices a cloaked figure on the building roof. Doctor tells Mihael that it's time to transfer him to another facility. During the night, Mihael climbs to the roof, but doctor manages to prevent him from jumping, once again noticing the stalker in the hospital yard. In the morning, a carriage comes to take Mihael to another hospital. Mihael seemingly accepts, but while doctor and him are walking down the hall, he suddenly opens the window and jumps out, committing suicide. The doctor once again encounters the young man's pursuer, and informs him that his protégé is dead. The pursuer replies that he is aware of the fact, and that the doctor is to blame for his death. The hospital is visited by a funeral carriage driven by the pursuer, and the hospital staff lay the coffin on the carriage. One of the nurses removes Mihael's drawing from the wall, while the carriage with the coffin passes the fallen tree.

== Cast ==
- Milan Caci Mihailović as Mihael
- Branko Pleša as the doctor
- Dušan Janićijević as the stalker
- Toma Kuruzović as paramedic
- Ljubomir Ćipranić as Nikola, the janitor
- Svetlana Blagojević as nurse
- Nadežda Vukićević as patient
- Damjan Klašnja as patient
- Bogdan Jakuš as patient
