= Uncle Hyacynth =

1956 film

- A poster bearing the film's Spanish release title: Mi tío Jacinto
- Directed by: Ladislao Vajda
- Written by: Andrés Laszlo; Ladislao Vajda
- Produced by: Raoul Ploquin
- Starring: Pablito Calvo
- Cinematography: Heinrich Gärtner
- Edited by: Julio Peña
- Release date: 31 March 1956
- Running time: 90 minutes
- Countries: Spain; Italy
- Language: Spanish

Uncle Hyacynth (Spanish: Mi tío Jacinto) is a 1956 Spanish drama film directed by Ladislao Vajda. At the 6th Berlin International Film Festival, Pablito Calvo won the Golden Bear (Audience Award) for his interpretation in this film.

== Cast ==
- Pablito Calvo - Pepote
- Antonio Vico - Jacinto
- José Marco Davó - Police inspector
- Juan Calvo - Second-hand-clothes dealer
- Mariano Azaña - Match seller
- Pastora Peña - Stamp seller
- Julio Sanjuán - Organ grinder
- Miguel Gila - Paco the con man
- Giulio Battiferri - Milkman
- José Isbert - Sánchez the watch forger
- Adriano Domínguez - Police officer
- Juan Calvo Domenech - Tailor
- Luis Sánchez Polack - Tailor's clerk
- Joaquín Portillo 'Top' - Paco's partner in swindle
- José María Lado
- Rafael Bardem - Art agent
- Paolo Stoppa - Art forger
