= José María Sánchez-Silva =

Spanish writer (1911–2002)

- Born: José María Sánchez-Silva y García-Morales; 11 November 1911; Madrid, Spain
- Died: 13 January 2002 (aged 90); Madrid, Spain

José María Sánchez-Silva y García-Morales (11 November 1911 – 13 January 2002) was a Spanish writer. He received the Hans Christian Andersen Medal in 1968 for his contribution to children's literature. He is best known for his novel Marcelino (1953) which was filmed in 1955, as Miracle of Marcelino.

== Early life ==
Sánchez-Silva was born in Madrid. His father, also José María Sánchez Silva, was a journalist close to anarchism, writing in the journal Earth, who went into exile in 1939. The family had been unstructured and the son (Sánchez-Silva) at times was practically a vagrant child. He joined institutions for orphans and children at risk such as Del Pardo School of Madrid (dependent on the City Council of Madrid). In these institutions he learned typing and shorthand, which earned him a stenographer's position in Madrid.

== Career ==
In 1934, he published his first book The Man in the Scarf.

During the Spanish Civil War, he remained in the Republican zone in Madrid, working with the Falange until Nationalist troops entered the city. In 1939, he began working as a journalist in the newspaper Arriba. He became assistant principal of the paper and collaborated with the newspaper Pueblo.

Sánchez-Silva won fame as a result of Marcelino (Marcelino, pan y vino, 1953), which was made into a film by Ladislao Vajda as Miracle of Marcelino, and became one of the great successes of Spanish cinema worldwide. It was further adapted into Marcelino Pan y Vino and May Bukas Pa.

After the success of Marcelino, he returned to the character in stories Lesser Tales of Marcelino and Adventures in Heaven of Marcelino.

Together with José Luis Sáenz de Heredia, he was the author of the screenplay of the movie Franco, ese hombre, a biography in the caudillo.

== Awards ==
The biennial Hans Christian Andersen Award conferred by the International Board on Books for Young People is the highest recognition available to a writer or illustrator of children's books. Sánchez-Silva received the writing award in 1966.

He won the Spanish prize for literature in 1957.
