= Fantastic Night (1943 film) =

1943 film

- Directed by: Luis Marquina
- Written by: Antonio Mas Guindal; Luis Marquina
- Produced by: Luis Lucia
- Starring: Paola Barbara; Carlos Muñoz; Isabel de Pomés
- Cinematography: Willy Goldberger
- Edited by: Juan Pallejá
- Music by: José Ruiz de Azagra
- Production company: CIFESA
- Distributed by: CIFESA
- Release date: 6 September 1943
- Running time: 76 minutes
- Country: Spain
- Language: Spanish

Fantastic Night (Spanish: Noche fantástica) is a 1943 Spanish drama film directed by Luis Marquina and starring Paola Barbara, Carlos Muñoz and Isabel de Pomés. The film's sets were designed by the art director Enrique Alarcón.

== Cast ==
- Paola Barbara as Diana - Condesa de Tauste
- Carlos Muñoz as Pablo Aragón
- Isabel de Pomés as Alicia
- Mariano Asquerino as Jorge, Marqués de Brenes
- Fernando Fernán Gómez as Enamorado
- Luis Peña padre as Pedro
- Lily Vincenti as Viajera francesa
- Cristina Yomar as Enamorada
- Carmen Ortega as Madre de Alicia
- Julia Pachelo as Paula
- Antonio Bofarull as Camarero
- Carlo Tamberlani as Defensor de Pablo

== Bibliography ==
- Comas, Àngel. Diccionari de llargmetratges: el cinema a Catalunya durant la Segona República, la Guerra Civil i el franquisme (1930-1975). Cossetània Edicions, 2005.
- Roas, David. Historia de lo fantástico en la cultura española contemporánea (1900-2015). 2021.
