= Ladislao Vajda =

Hungarian-Spanish film director (1906–1965)

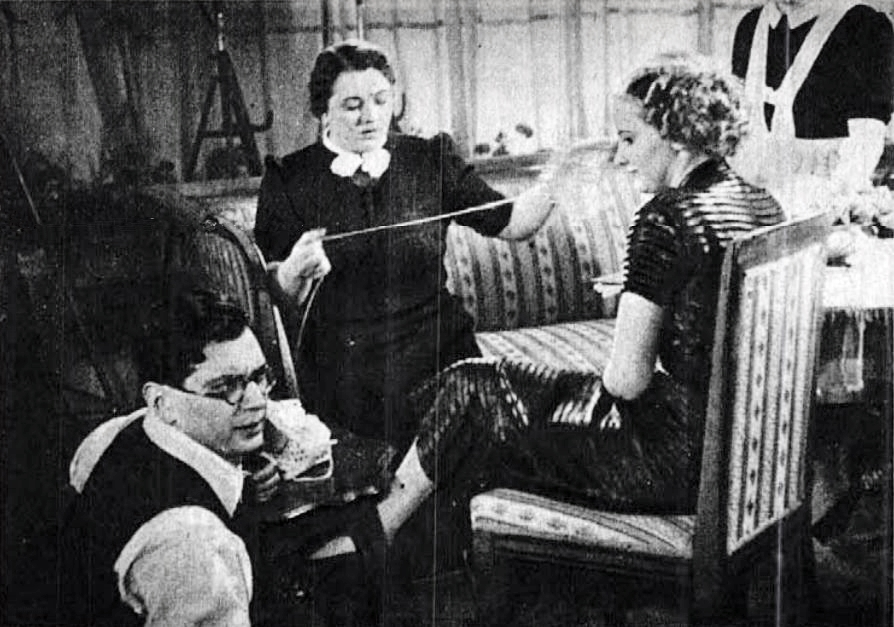
- Shooting photo from Az én lányom nem olyan. On the left the director László/Ladislao Vajda, in the middle Ella Gombaszögi, on the right Klári Tolnay.
- Born: Vajda László; 18 August 1906; Budapest, Austria-Hungary
- Died: 25 March 1965 (aged 58); Barcelona, Spain
- Resting place: Sacramental de San Justo, Madrid, Spain
- Other name: László Vajda
- Occupations: Film director, editor, writer, artistic designer
- Years active: 1932–1965
- Notable work: Miracle of Marcelino (1955); Uncle Hyacynth (1956); Afternoon of the Bulls (1956); The Man Who Wagged His Tail (1957); It Happened in Broad Daylight (1958)
- Parent: Ladislaus Vajda (father)

Ladislao Vajda (born Vajda László, Hungarian: [ˈvɒjdɒ ˈlaːsloː]; 18 August 1906 – 25 March 1965) was a Hungarian-Spanish film director who made films in Hungary, Spain, Portugal, the United Kingdom, Italy and West Germany.

== Biography ==
Vajda was born in Budapest, his father, Ladislaus Vajda, being an actor and screenwriter.

Vajda started his career as film editor (even though he also worked as artistic designer and writer) for different directors, such as Billy Wilder and Henry Koster. Eventually, he undertook his first directorial effort in his native country, Hungary.

Before World War II he became established in Italy, where he directed two movies: La zia smemorata (1940) and Giuliano de' Medici (1941). Finally, he moved to Spain, where he continued directing films. The first film from his Spanish period was Se vende un palacio (A Palace for Sale), released in 1943. During the 1940s, Vajda directed several movies in Portugal, United Kingdom and, mainly, in Spain.

However, he would reach his artistic peak in the 1950s. Vajda's movies during this period are clearly influenced by the German director Fritz Lang. His main works during this period are: Miracle of Marcelino (1955), Uncle Hyacynth (1956), Afternoon of the Bulls (1956), The Man Who Wagged His Tail (1957) with Peter Ustinov, and It Happened in Broad Daylight (1958). They were acclaimed by both critics and public: The Miracle of Marcelino and Uncle Hyacynth won different prizes in Cannes Film Festival and Berlin Film Festival; Afternoon of the Bulls was nominated for the Palme d'Or and It Happened in Broad Daylight for the Golden Bear.

During the 1960s, Vajda worked on several different minor works in West Germany and Spain. He died in Barcelona in 1965.

== Filmography ==
- The Beggar Student (1931) German
- The Fate of Renate Langen (1931) German
- The Woman They Talk About (1931) German
- My Heart Longs for Love (1931) German
- Once There Was a Waltz (1932) German
- A Bit of Love (1932) German
- Two Lucky Days (1932) German
- Where Is This Lady? (1932) British
- Love on Skis (1933)
- Ball at the Savoy (1935) Austrian-Hungarian
- Haut comme trois pommes (1935)
- Hello, Budapest! (1935) Hungarian
- Sensation (1936) Hungarian
- The Man Under the Bridge (1936) Hungarian
- Three Dragons (1936) Hungarian
- Cafe Moscow (1936) Hungarian
- Wings Over Africa (1937) British
- The Wife of General Ling (1937) British
- The Borrowed Castle (1937) Hungarian
- My Daughter Is Different (1937) Hungarian
- Princess Tarakanova (1938) French-Italian
- Magda Expelled (1938) Hungarian
- Döntő pillanat (1938) – Hungarian
- Black Diamonds (1938) Hungarian
- Rézi Friday (1938) Hungarian
- La zia smemorata (1940) Italian
- Giuliano de' Medici (1941) Italian
- A Palace for Sale (1942) Spanish
- Doce lunas de miel (1944) Spanish
- Te quiero para mí (1944) Spanish
- El Testamento del virrey (1944) Spanish
- O Diabo São Elas (1945) Portuguese
- Cinco lobitos (1945)
- Three Mirrors (1947) Portuguese
- Viela, Rua Sem Sol (1947) Portuguese
- Barrio (1947) Spanish
- Call of the Blood (1948) British-Italian
- The Golden Madonna (1949) British-Italian
- Sin uniforme (1950) – Spanish
- The Woman with No Name (1950) British
- The Seventh Page (1951) Spanish
- Spanish Serenade (1952) Spanish
- Doña Francisquita (1953) Spanish
- Carne de horca (1953) Italian-Spanish
- Aventuras del barbero de Sevilla (1954) French-Spanish
- Marcelino pan y vino (1955) Spanish
- Tarde de toros (1956) Spanish
- Mi tío Jacinto (1956) Spanish
- Un ángel pasó por Brooklyn (1957) Spanish-Italian
- It Happened in Broad Daylight (1958) German
- The Man Who Walked Through the Wall (1959) West German
- Maria, Registered in Bilbao (1960) Spanish
- The Shadows Grow Longer (1961) West German-Swiss
- The Liar (1961) West German
- The Lightship (1963) West German
- A Nearly Decent Girl (1963) West German-Spanish
- La Dama de Beirut (1965) Italian
