= Đorđe Kadijević =

Serbian film director (1933–2026)

- Ђорђе Кадијевић
- Born: 6 January 1933; Šibenik, Yugoslavia
- Died: 10 July 2026 (aged 93); Belgrade, Serbia
- Occupations: Film director; screenwriter; art critic
- Years active: 1967–?
- Spouse: Danica Kadijević
- Children: 2

Đorđe Kadijević (Serbian Cyrillic: Ђорђе Кадијевић; 6 January 1933 – 10 July 2026) was a Serbian film director, screenwriter and art critic. He is well known for his horror films and for TV series Vuk Karadžić. He died on 10 July 2026, at the age of 93.

== Awards ==
Vuk Karadžić won the Grand prix in Rome, and was protected as European Intangible Cultural Heritage by UNESCO, on the proposition of Umberto Eco.

He was awarded the Sretenje Order by the Republic of Serbia.

== Filmography ==
- Praznik (1967)
- Pohod (1968)
- Heksaptih (1968)
- Darovi moje rođake Marije (1969)
- Žarki (1970)
- Čudo (1971)
- Pukovnikovica (1972)
- Devičanska svirka (1973)
- Ward (1973)
- Leptirica (1973)
- Zakletva (1974)
- Marija (1976)
- Beogradska deca (1976)
- Aranđelov udes (1976)
- Čovek koji je pojeo vuka (1981)
- Živo meso (1981)
- Karađorđeva smrt (1983)
- Sveto mesto (1990)
- Napadač (1993)

=== Television series ===
- Vuk Karadžić (1987—1988)
- Poslednja audijencija (2008)
