= The Black Siren =

- Directed by: Carlos Serrano de Osma
- Written by: Emilia Pardo Bazán (novel); Juan Antonio Cabezas; Pedro Lazaga; José Vega Picó; Carlos Serrano de Osma
- Starring: Fernando Fernán Gómez; Isabel de Pomés; María Asquerino; José María Lado
- Cinematography: Salvador Torres Garriga
- Music by: Jesús García Leoz
- Production company: Boga Films
- Release date: 1947
- Running time: 77 minutes
- Country: Spain
- Language: Spanish

The Black Siren (Spanish: La sirena negra) is a 1947 Spanish drama film directed by Carlos Serrano de Osma and starring Fernando Fernán Gómez, Isabel de Pomés and María Asquerino. A man falls in love with a dying young woman. It was based on a novel by Emilia Pardo Bazán.

== Cast ==
- Fernando Fernán Gómez
- María Asquerino
- Isabel de Pomés
- José María Lado
- Anita Farra
- Ketty Clavijo
- Graciela Crespo
- Ramón Martori

== Bibliography ==
- Bentley, Bernard. A Companion to Spanish Cinema. Boydell & Brewer 2008.
- Labanyi, Jo & Pavlović, Tatjana. A Companion to Spanish Cinema. John Wiley & Sons, 2012.
