= José Marco Davó =

Spanish actor (1895–1974)

- Born: May 10, 1895; Orihuela (Alicante), Spain
- Died: September 27, 1974 (aged 79); Torrevieja (Alicante), Spain
- Occupation: Actor
- Years active: 1934–1969 (film)

José Marco Davó (May 10, 1895 – September 27, 1974) was a Spanish film actor.

== Selected filmography ==
- Es mi hombre (1934)
- Don Quintín el amargao (1935) - Nicasio
- La última falla (1940)
- Whirlwind (1941) - Portero
- Dawn of America (1951) - Martín Alonso Pinzón
- I Was a Parish Priest (1953) - Don César
- The Mayor of Zalamea (1954) - Don Lope de Figueroa
- It Happened in Seville (1955) - Fernando Aguilar
- Miracle of Marcelino (1955) - Pascual
- The Coyote (1955) - Sullivan (uncredited)
- Uncle Hyacynth (1956) - Inspector
- También hay cielo sobre el mar (1956)
- Thunderstorm (1956) - Padre Flores
- We're All Necessary (1956) - Campesino, padre familia numerosa
- The Legion of Silence (1956)
- Whom God Forgives (1957) - Fray Francisco
- The Man Who Wagged His Tail (1957) - Judge
- Spanish Affair (1957) - Padre
- La Cenicienta y Ernesto (1957) - Don Rufino
- El tigre de Chamberí (1958) - Sr. Román
- Il marito (1958) - Commendatore Rinaldi
- The Tenant (1958) - Fulgencio
- The Night Heaven Fell (1958) - Le chef de la police
- Vengeance (1958) - Hombre 1
- Let's Make the Impossible! (1958) - Don Emilio
- Los clarines del miedo (1958) - Don Ramón
- La muralla (1958) - Don Javier
- Where Are You Going, Alfonso XII? (1959) - Antonio Cánovas del Castillo
- El Salvador (1959)
- El redentor (1959) - El mal ladrón
- Soft Skin on Black Silk (1959) - Michel
- Luxury Cabin (1959) - Don Fabián Mouriz
- Salto a la gloria (1959) - Don Justo, padre de Santiago
- A Girl Against Napoleon (1959) - Alcalde
- Back to the Door (1959) - Barea
- Vacations in Majorca (1959) - The Police Commissioner (uncredited)
- The Jinx (1959) - Director Banco Metropolitano
- Juanito (1960) - General Vegas
- Alfonso XII and María Cristina (1960) - Antonio Cánovas del Castillo
- A Girl from Chicago (1960)
- Maria, Registered in Bilbao (1960) - Don Ángel
- Hay alguien detrás de la puerta (1961) - Inspector López
- Alerta en el cielo (1961) - Dr. Luis Medina
- Ha llegado un ángel (1961) - Don Ramón
- Kill and Be Killed (1962) - Doctor
- Zorro the Avenger (1962) - Gobernador
- Tómbola (1962) - Don Lorenzo, el párroco
- La gran familia (1962) - Don Pedro
- Shades of Zorro (1962) - Gobernador
- Todos eran culpables (1962) - Señor Costa
- Mi Buenos Aires querido (1962)
- The Sign of the Coyote (1963)
- Marisol rumbo a Río (1963) - Don Fernando
- Gibraltar (1964) - Prestamista
- The Avenger of Venice (1964) - Bembo Altieri
- El señor de La Salle (1964) - Rafrond
- La frontera de Dios (1965)
- Currito of the Cross (1965) - Don Emilio
- Cabriola (1965) - Miguel
- Secuestro en la ciudad (1965) - Don Francisco - comisario
- He's My Man! (1966) - D. Felipe
- Mutiny at Fort Sharpe (1966) - Cabo Brandy
- Fray Torero (1966) - Don Julián
- Los guardiamarinas (1967) - Sr. Ferreira
- Death on High Mountain (1969)
- De Picos Pardos a la ciudad (1969) - Don Melquiades
- Esa mujer (1969) - Juan José (final film role)

== Bibliography ==
- Pitts, Michael R. Western Movies: A Guide to 5,105 Feature Films. McFarland, 2012.
