= Filip David =

Serbian writer and screenwriter (1940–2025)

- Филип Давид
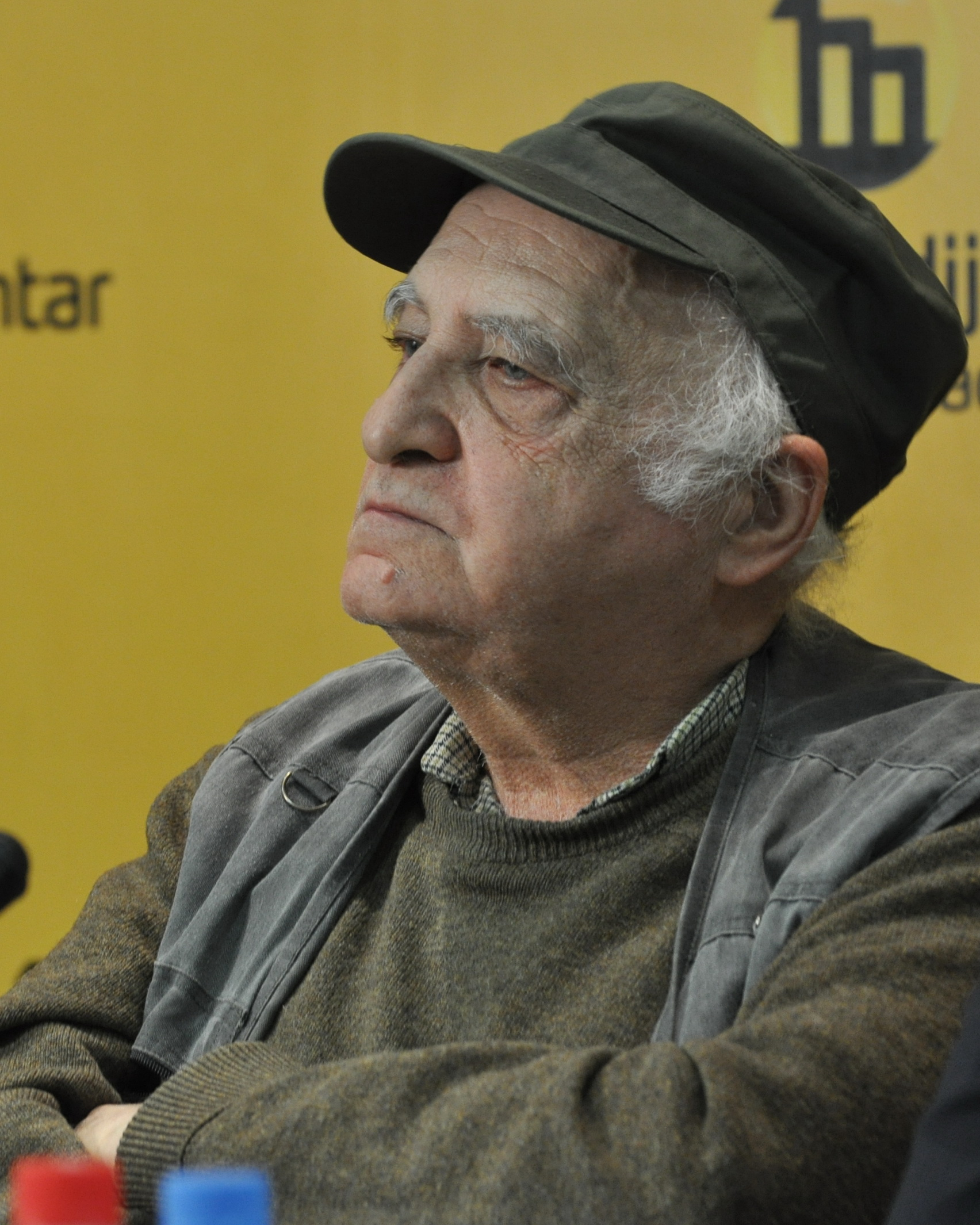
- David in 2013
- Born: 4 July 1940; Kragujevac, Kingdom of Yugoslavia
- Died: 14 April 2025 (aged 84)
- Education: University of Belgrade
- Occupation: Writer
- Writing career
- Language: Serbian
- Notable awards: NIN Award; 2014 Kuća sećanja i zaborava

Filip David (Serbian Cyrillic: Филип Давид; 4 July 1940 – 14 April 2025) was a Serbian writer and screenwriter, best known for penning essays, dramas, short stories and novels. In 1987, he was awarded the Andrić Prize for his short story collection Princ Vatre, and in 2015 he won the NIN Award for best Serbian novel of the year 2014 for his novel Kuća sećanja i zaborava ("The House of Remembering and Forgetting").

== Life and career ==
David was born on 4 July 1940 in Kragujevac to a Jewish family. Members of his family were some of the victims of the 1941 Kragujevac massacre committed by occupation forces during the World War II in Yugoslavia. He graduated from both the Faculty of Philology of the University of Belgrade and the Academy of Theater, Film, Radio and Television of the Belgrade University of Arts. He was a long-time editor of the drama program of the Radio Television of Belgrade. In 1989, he was one of the founders of the "Independent Writers" society in Sarajevo, in then-SFR Yugoslavia. He was also the founder of the literary society "Belgrade Circle" in 1990. This society opposed the then-ruling government of Slobodan Milošević. In 1992, David was fired from the Radio Television of Belgrade for organizing an independent trade union.

The writer was a signatory of the Declaration on the Common Language of the Croats, Serbs, Bosniaks and Montenegrins within the project Languages and Nationalisms. The declaration opposes the political separation of four Serbo-Croatian standard variants that leads to a series of negative social, cultural and political phenomena in which linguistic expression is enforced as a criterion of ethno-national affiliation and as a display of political loyalty in the successor states of Yugoslavia.

David died on 14 April 2025, at the age of 84.

== Work ==
David wrote several television dramas, dramas, books of essays, short story collections and novels.

Short story collections:

- "Bunar u tamnoj šumi" (English: "A Well in a Dark Forest")
- "Zapisi o stvarnom i nestvarnom" ("Notes of the real and the unreal")
- "Princ vatre" ("Fire Prince")
- "Sabrane i nove priče" ("Collected and New Stories")

Novels:

- "Hodočasnici neba i zemlje" ("Pilgrims of the Earth and the Sky")
- "San o ljubavi i smrti" ("A Dream of Love and Death")
- "Kuća sećanja i zaborava" ("The House of Memory and Oblivion", also translated as "The House of Remembering and Forgetting")

Books of essays:

- "Fragmenti iz mračnih vremena" ("Fragments from Dark Times")
- "Jesmo li čudovišta" ("Are We Monsters")
- "Svetovi u haosu" ("Worlds in Chaos")
