= Neda Spasojević =

Serbian actress (1941–1981)

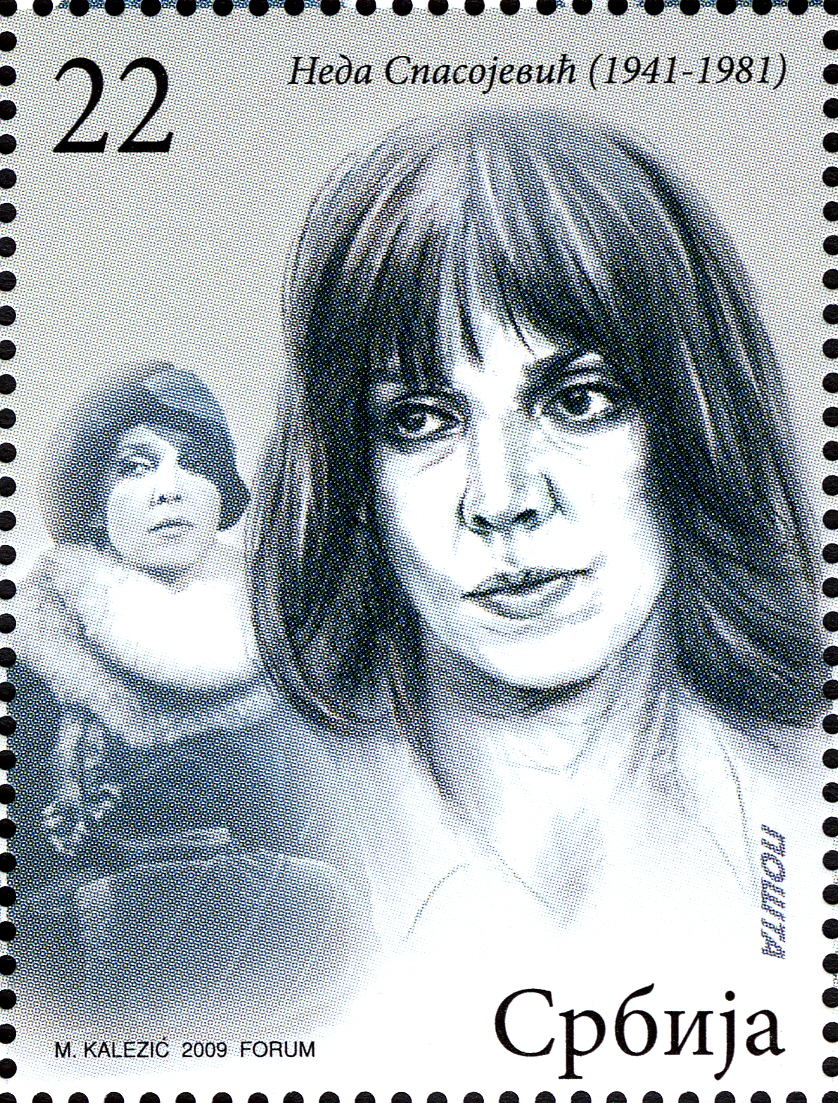
- Born: 16 April 1941; Belgrade, Kingdom of Yugoslavia
- Died: 16 July 1981 (aged 40); Belgrade, Yugoslavia
- Occupation: Actor
- Years active: 1961–81
- Spouse: Bane Minić

Neda Spasojević (16 April 1941 – 16 July 1981) was a Serbian film, television and theater actress. She appeared in more than sixty films from 1964 until her 1981 death from cancer at age 40.

== Early life ==
Neda Spasojević was born in the Yugoslav capital city Belgrade the week that the Kingdom of Yugoslavia was invaded by Germany in April 1941. Her father Milorad was a traveling actor. Her mother was an Austrian woman from Vienna named Hilda Lermer, who later adopted the Serbian name Jelena. Hilda worked as a seamstress for various theaters.

== Career ==
Following a rejection at the Performing Arts Academy in Belgrade, Spasojević took her father's advice about moving to Titograd, SR Montenegro if she wished to pursue a career in acting. She performed in her first show on 23 March 1961. Spasojević appeared in her first film in 1964, acting alongside Danilo Stojković in Izdajnik.

== Death ==
Spasojević was diagnosed with cancer in early 1981. She died from cancer on 16 July 1981, aged 40, a few weeks after completing her scenes for the film Banović Strahinja.

== Selected filmography ==
Year	Title	Role	Notes
1981	The Falcon		
1975	Backbone		
1972	Traces of a Black Haired Girl		
1972	Walter Defends Sarajevo	Mirna	
1969	An Event		
