= The Tower of the Seven Hunchbacks (novel) =

1920 novel by Emilio Carrere

- Author: Emilio Carrere
- Language: Spanish
- Genre: Historical; Horror
- Publication date: 1920
- Publication place: Spain
- Media type: Print

The Tower of the Seven Hunchbacks (Spanish: La Torre de los Siete Jorobados) is a 1920 novel by the Spanish writer Emilio Carrere. It is a gothic mystery with elements of horror set in 19th-century Madrid. The body of the story itself is cobbled together from several of Carrere's pre-existing short stories.

There is some question over whether Carrere was solely responsible for the work, and some academics believe that Spanish science fiction writer Jesús de Aragón was responsible for substantial portions of the text.

== History ==
The protagonist is Basilio Beltrán, a superstitious man fond of games of chance, who enjoys the company of hunchbacks because he believes they bring good luck. One day, in a casino, he encounters the ghost of a man named Robinsón de Mantua. The ghost summons him to the Madrid of the Habsburgs and tasks him with uncovering the secret of his murder. This leads Basilio to discover an underground city built by Jews in the 15th century who sought to avoid exile. There exists a sect whose members are all hunchbacks.

== Film adaptation ==
In 1944 the novel served as the basis for the film The Tower of the Seven Hunchbacks directed by Edgar Neville.

== Bibliography ==
- Hardy, Phil & Milne, Tom. Horror. Aurum Press, 1996.

== See also ==
- The Hunchback of Notre-Dame by Victor Hugo
