= Emilio Carrere =

Spanish writer

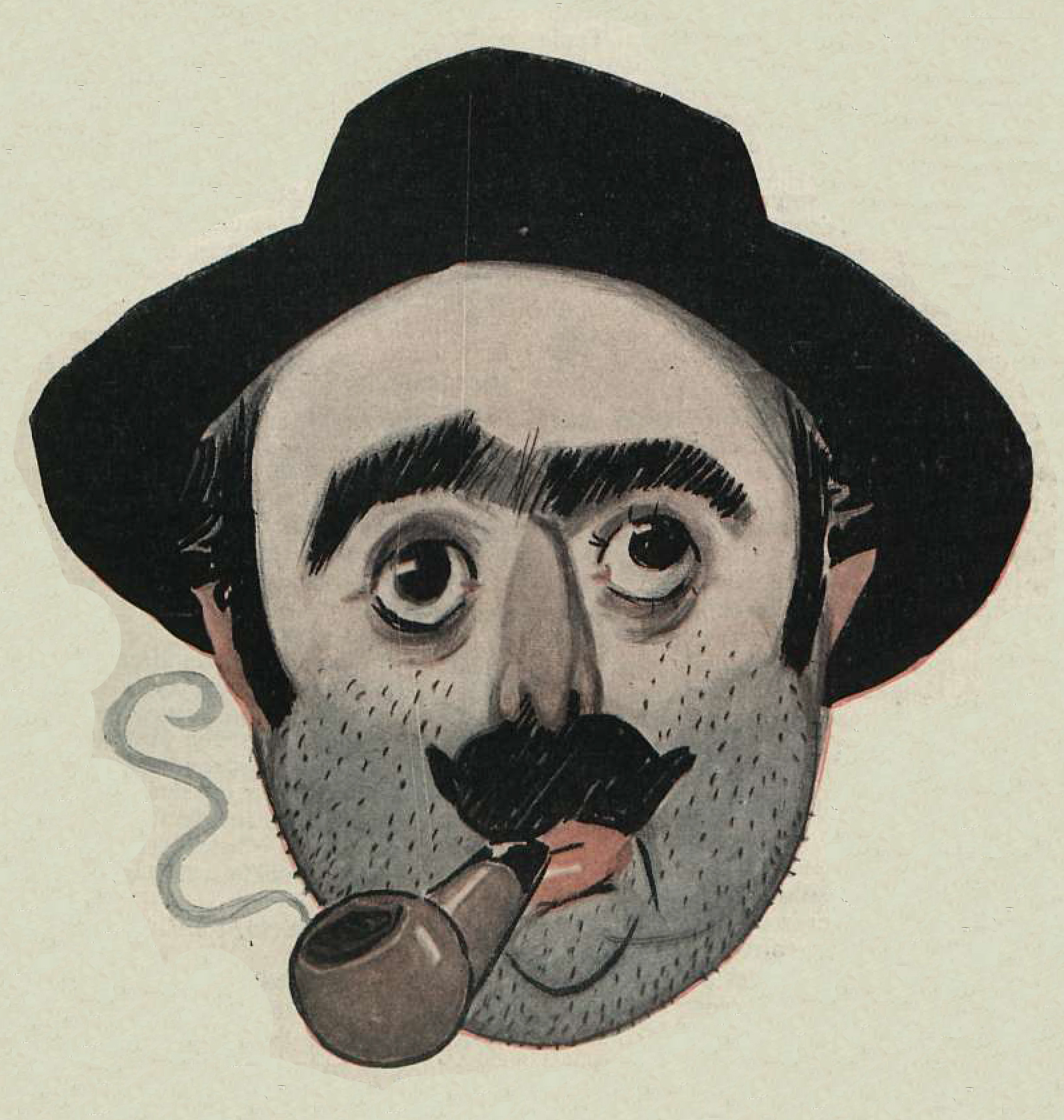
- Born: 18 December 1881; Madrid, Spain
- Died: 30 April 1947; Madrid, Spain
- Occupation: Writer

Emilio Carrere (Madrid, 18 December 1881 – Madrid, 30 April 1947) was a Spanish writer. He is best known for his 1920 gothic historical novel La torre de los siete jorobados (Eng: The Tower of the Seven Hunchbacks). In 1944, this was the basis for the film, La torre de los siete jorobados, directed by Edgar Neville.

== Works ==
=== Poetry ===
- Románticas (1902)
- El caballero de la muerte (1909)
- Del amor, del dolor y del misterio (1915)
- Dietario sentimental (1916)
- Nocturnos de otoño (1920)
- Los ojos de los fantasmas (1920, second edition, Buenos Aires, 1924)
- Ruta emocional de Madrid (1935)

=== Prose ===
- La cofradía de la pirueta (1912)
- Rosas de meretricio (1917)
- La copa de Verlaine (1918)
- Aventuras extraordinarias de Garcín de Tudela (1919)
- La torre de los siete jorobados (Eng: The Tower of the Seven Hunchbacks) (1920)
- El sacrificio (1922)
- La Amazona (1923)
- La cortesana de las cruces (1925)
- La calavera de Atahualpa (1934)

== Bibliography ==
- Hardy, Phil & Milne, Tom. Horror. Aurum Press, 1996.
