= Ljiljana Krstić =

Serbian actress

- Љиљана Крстић
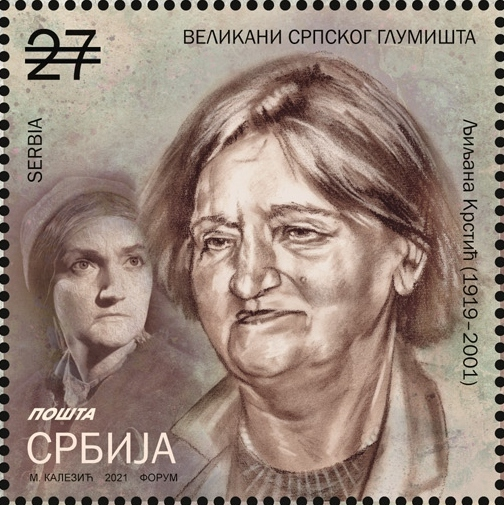
- Born: 31 October 1919; Kragujevac, Kingdom of Serbs, Croats and Slovenes
- Died: 12 April 2001 (aged 81); Belgrade, FR Yugoslavia
- Occupation: Actor
- Years active: 1954–2000

Ljiljana Krstić (Serbian Cyrillic: Љиљана Крстић; 31 October 1919 – 12 April 2001) was a Serbian actress who mostly worked in theater.

Krstić initially studied law, before transferring to the Theatre Department of the Musical Academy in Belgrade. After graduation, she worked at National Theatre, Yugoslav Drama Theatre, Belgrade Drama Theatre and Atelje 212 Theatre. In 1995 she received the Dobričin prsten, which is considered the most distinguished award in the Serbian theater.

== Selected filmography ==
Year	Title	Role	Notes
1998	Savior		
1981	The Fall of Italy		
1980	Days of Dreams		
1980	Petria's Wreath		
1962	The Steppe		
