= Momčilo Nastasijević =

Serbian author (1894 – 1938)

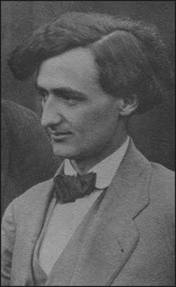
Photo of Nastasijević

Momčilo Nastasijević (23 September 1894 – 13 February 1938) was a Serbian poet, novelist and dramatist born in Gornji Milanovac in Serbia, and whose work was issued during the interwar period. He spent most of his adult life, however, teaching at a Belgrade Gymnasium. During his lifetime Momčilo Nastasijević was less well known than some of his contemporaries, such as Miloš Crnjanski and Rastko Petrović, but lately, however, his work has begun to be noticed again. His literary output was not large, and it gained immediate appreciation only in a narrow circle of intimate friends. Poetry with its close affinity to music brought about a successful team-effort between poet Momčilo Nastasijević and his brother Svetomir Nastasijević the music composer.

== Biography ==
Momčilo Nastasijević was born in Gornji Milanovac in Serbia in 1894. He studied French and Comparative Literature at the University of Belgrade and spent most of his life in Belgrade working as a French teacher at a high school. Besides poetry, Nastasijević also wrote essays, fiction, and drama. He was also notably the sole friend of Gavrilo Princip - the political assassin of Archduke Franz Ferdinand.

Although he published poems regularly in leading literary periodicals such as Misao (Thought) and Srpski književni glasnik (Serbian Literary Herald), he remained relatively unnoticed. He privately published his one volume of poetry, Pet lirskih krugova (Five Lyrical Cycles, 1932). One reason for this lack of recognition was that—with his individual views of poetry and literature and the problems of the development of the Serbian literary language—he was outside the trends of expressionism and surrealist Marxism dominant in Belgrade at the time. Another reason was that his compression of style and his individual imagery make him an extraordinarily difficult poet, especially for those who seek a paraphrasable meaning in poetry. For this reason, according to Vasa Mihajlović, Nastasijević has been accused of being hermetic by some critics. He also attempted to formulate through his works a national and religious philosophy whose roots, again, he found in the dark recesses of the soul of his nation.

He died in Belgrade in 1938.

== Works ==
In 1922 Momčilo Nastasijević's poems were first published, and in 1923 his first prose appeared in leading Belgrade reviews and periodicals, particularly Srpski Knjižani Glasnik and Misao.

The dramatic opus of Momčilo Nastasijević consists of three "lyrical dramas" Nedozvani (The Unevoked), Gospodar Mladenova čer (Master Mladen's Daughter), Kod 'Večite slavine' (At 'The Eternal Tap'), two musical dramas, Medjuluško blago (The Treasure of Medjulužje), Djuradj Branković, and a "ballet drama" Zivi ognaj (Live Fire). This small but varied repertoire reflects, in concentrated form, the Serbian offering to the new European turn-of-the-century Symbolist drama running parallel with, but forming a separate stream to, the mainstream Naturalist theatre. The "lyric drama" as theatre medium has its immediate antecedents in the "musical dramas" (Musikdramen), composed by Richard Wagner as libretti for his own innovative operas. The widespread popularity of the lyrical drama in the 20th-turn-of-the-century European theatre, and its close affinity to music, brought about successful team-efforts between poets and composers, such as Hugo von Hofmannsthal and Richard Strauss, Alexander Blok and Mikhail Kuzmin, Milutin Bojić and Miloje Milojević, Milorad M. Petrović Seljančica and Božidar Joksimović, and Momčilo Nastasijević and his brother Svetomir Nastasijević.
