= Slobodan Perović =

Serbian actor

- Слободан Перовић
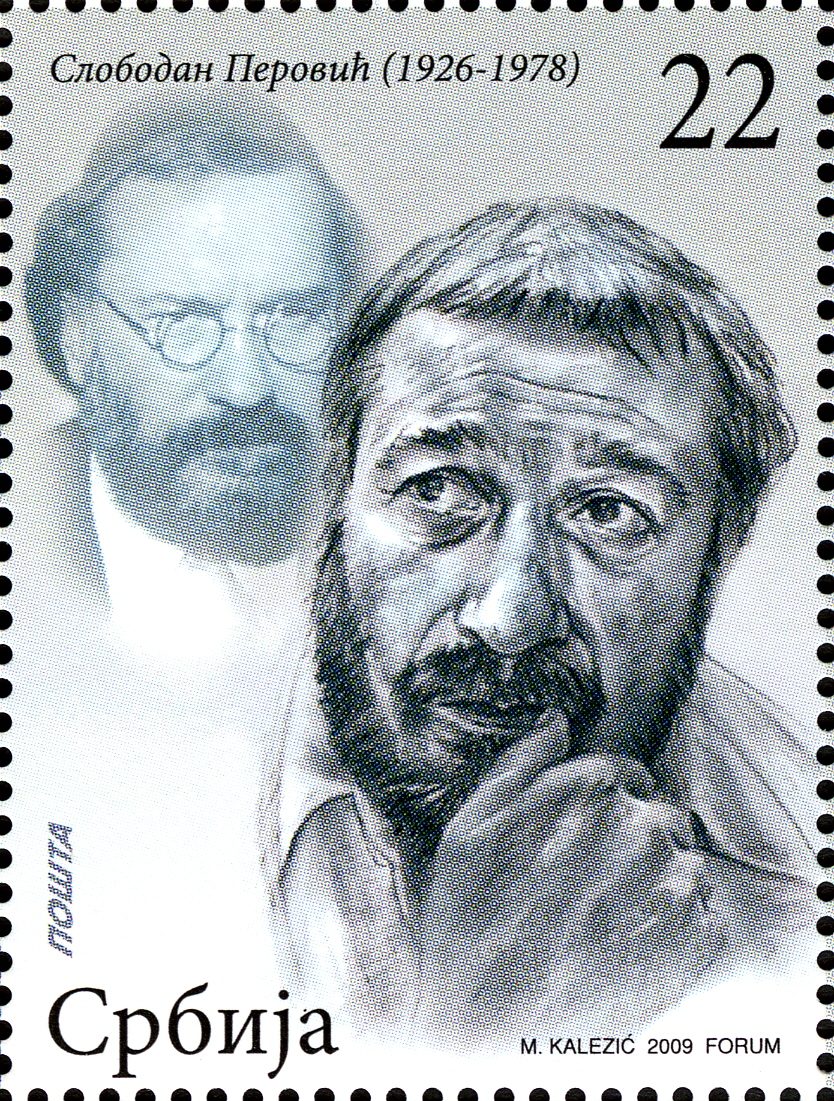
- Born: 6 May 1926; Kragujevac, Kingdom of Serbs, Croats and Slovenes
- Died: 2 May 1978 (aged 51); Belgrade, SFR Yugoslavia
- Other name: Cica Perović
- Occupation: Actor
- Years active: 1955–1978

Slobodan "Cica" Perović (Serbian Cyrillic: Слободан "Цица" Перовић; 6 May 1926 – 2 May 1978) was a Serbian actor. He appeared in more than seventy films from 1955 to 1978.

Cica Perović is pronounced Tsitsa Perovitsh.

== Selected filmography ==
Film
Year	Title	Role	Notes
1978	Ward Six		
1969	The Bridge		
1967	The Rats Woke Up		
1965	Three		
1960	The Fourteenth Day		
1957	Priests Ćira and Spira		

TV
Year	Title	Role	Notes
1976	The Farm in the Small Marsh	Jacob Jerich	
1973	Leptirica	Živan	
