= The Tower of the Seven Hunchbacks (film) =

- Film poster
- Directed by: Edgar Neville
- Written by: Emilio Carrere (novel)
- Produced by: Germán López Prieto; España Films
- Starring: Antonio Casal; Isabel de Pomés
- Cinematography: Henri Barreyre (as Enrique Barreyre); Andrés Pérez Cubero
- Edited by: Sara Ontañón
- Music by: José Ruiz de Azagra
- Distributed by: España Films
- Release date: 23 November 1944
- Running time: 85 minutes
- Country: Spain
- Language: Spanish

The Tower of the Seven Hunchbacks (Spanish:La Torre de los Siete Jorobados) is a 1944 Spanish mystery film directed by Edgar Neville. It is based on a novel of the same title by Emilio Carrere.

In the film, a young man wins a small fortune through gambling according to the advice of an archaeologist's ghost. While investigating the archaeologist's supposed suicide, the man and his friend discover a Jewish underground city beneath Habsburg Madrid.

== Plot ==
Basilio is a superstitious young man who courts the singer La Bella Medusa. Looking for money to invite her and her mother, he gambles. He wins a small fortune following the advice of Robinsón de Mantua. He is revealed to be the ghost of an archeologist dead after an apparent suicide. Basilio is attracted to Inés, who happens to be the niece of Professor Mantua. She refuses the verdict of suicide and asks for his help.

Basilio is helped by his friend, a police agent. They discover a passage from Mantua's home into an underground city under Habsburg Madrid, founded by Jews escaping their 1492 expulsion and now inhabited by money-forging hunchbacks led by Dr. Sabatino. The hunchbacks hold Inés and an archeologist friend of Mantua and try to force Basilio into staying. Basilio manages to escape and returns with the police to find Inés at her home, who barely remembers what happened. The police chief wants to arrest Basilio, but Inés intercedes. Meanwhile, Sabatino has blown down the tunnels.

== Themes ==
The film features antisemitic tropes as core element of the plot, namely the appearance of a subterranean city dwelled by nefarious hunchbacks, founded by Jews back in 1492. The idea that the hunchbacks are the descendants of the Jews is not explicit, though.

== Cast ==
- Antonio Casal as Basilio Beltrán
- Isabel de Pomés as Inés
- Guillermo Marín as Doctor Sabatino
- Félix de Pomés as Don Robinson de Mantua
- Julia Lajos as Madre de la 'Bella Medusa'
- Julia Pachelo as Braulia
- Manolita Morán as La 'Bella Medusa'
- Antonio Riquelme as Don Zacarías
- José Franco as Espectro de Napoleón
- Manuel Miranda
- Emilio Barta
- Antonio L. Estrada
- Luis Ballester
- Luis Latorre
- Rosario Royo
- Julián García
- Francisco Zabala
- Natalia Daina
- Carmen García
- José Arias
- Antonio Zaballos

== Bibliography ==
- Mira, Alberto. The A to Z of Spanish Cinema. Rowman & Littlefield, 2010.

== See also ==
- The Hunchback of Notre Dame (1939 film)
