= Isabel de Pomés =

Spanish actress

- Born: 10 April 1924; Barcelona, Spain
- Died: 31 May 2007 (aged 83)
- Years active: 1941–1965

Isabel de Pomés (10 April 1924 – 31 May 2007) was a classic Spanish film actress and one of the leading ladies in Spanish cinema of the 1940s and 1950s.

She appeared in over 30 films between 1941 and 1965.

Her father was the actor and sportsman Félix de Pomés.

== Selected filmography ==
- El Puente de la Ilusion (1965)
- Salto a la Gloria 1959
- Night and Dawn (1958)
- Amanecer en Puerta Oscura1957
- Un ángel Paso por Brooklyn 1957
- Marcelino Pan y Vino 1954
- The Mayor of Zalamea (1954)
- The King's Mail (1951)
- Luna de Sangre (1950)
- Vida en Sombras(1948)
- Botón de Ancla (1947)
- The Black Siren (1947)
- Cancion de Medianoche 1947
- The Tower of the Seven Hunchbacks 1944 by Edgar Neville
- Traces of Light 1943
- Fantastic Night (1943)
- Vidas Cruzadas 1942
- Los Millones de Polichinela (1941)
