= Fishenden =

Fishenden is a surname. Notable people with the surname include:

- Jerry Fishenden, English futurologist
- Paul Fishenden (born 1963), English footballer
