= Nicolás Soria González =

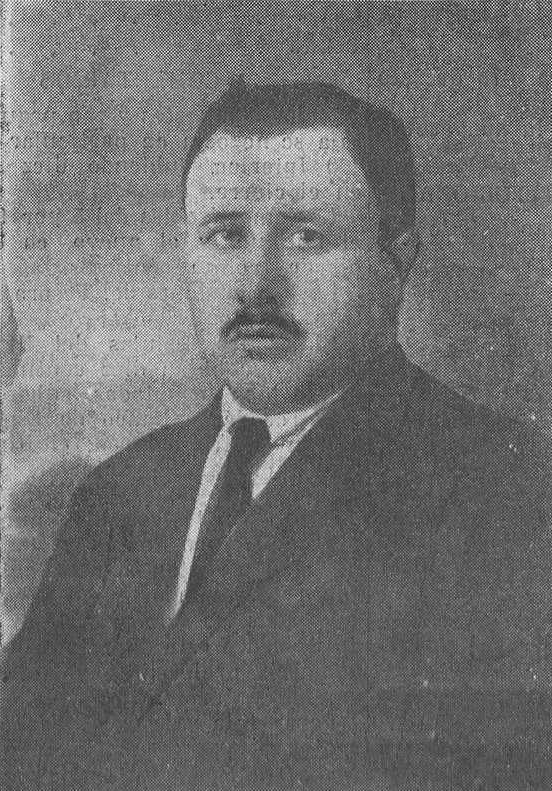
- Born: 12 August 1882; Avilés, Spain
- Died: 28 August 1933 (aged 51); Oviedo, Spain
- Occupation: painter

Nicolás Soria González (Avilés, 12 August 1882 – Oviedo, 28 August 1933) was a Spanish realist painter.

== Biography ==
Born in the Ferrería neighborhood of Avilés (Asturias) into a family of painters, a tradition begun by his grandfather, Nicolás. His father, Policarpo Soria Álvarez, and his brothers Jesús, Florentino, and Manuel were also painters. As the second oldest brother, he began his painting studies with his father and later at the Escuela de Artes y Oficios in Avilés. In 1899, he moved to Madrid with his brother Jesús to study at the Escuela Especial de Pintura, Escultura y Grabado, where he was a student of Luis Menéndez Pidal, Muñoz Degraín, Alejo Vera and Moreno Carbonero.

From 1906 onwards, he combined painting with art teaching. He passed the competitive examinations for secondary school teachers and was appointed professor of drawing at the Institute of Murcia, until in 1912 he obtained a transfer to the Institute of Oviedo, where he finally settled. Some critics have pointed out that this dedication to teaching prevented him from adapting his painting to the new styles that were already beginning to emerge, albeit tentatively, in some of his contemporaries.

A frequent participant in the National Exhibition of Fine Arts since 1901, he received three honorable mentions in 1904, 1906, and 1908, a third-class medal in 1920 for his work Los nuevos esposos, and a second-class medal in 1926 for La Galerna. He also participated in the 1929 Barcelona International Exposition. He was one of the founding members of the Royal Institute of Asturian Studies, established in 1920, and a corresponding member of the Royal Academy of Fine Arts of San Fernando from 1928.

Located within the realist movement, his work focused on genre painting and portraiture, although he also painted still lifes and landscapes, showing some influence from the work of Nicanor Piñole. Some of his works, such as La Huelga (1924), touch on social themes, but without engaging in true social critique, which aligns him with social naturalism. He died in Oviedo in 1933.

== See also ==
- Realism (art movement)
