= School of Health and Medical Sciences, City St George's, University of London =

Coordinates: 51°31′4″N 0°5′54″W

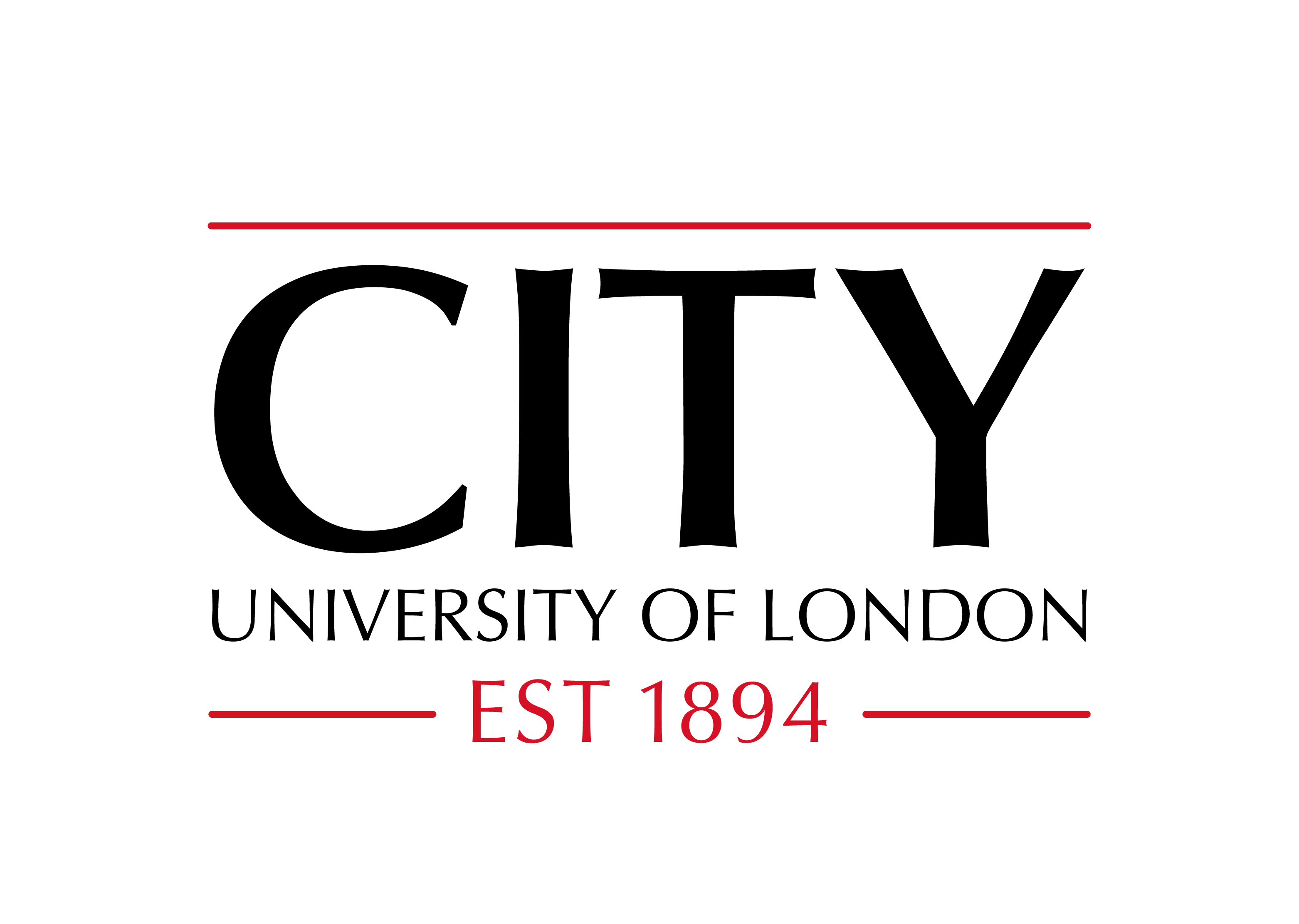
- Established: 1834 – St George's Hospital Medical School; 1867 – St Bartholomew School of Nursing and Midwifery; 1994 – School of health sciences, City University; 2024 – School of health and medical science, City St George's, University of London
- Parent institution: City St George's, University of London
- Location: London, England, United Kingdom
- Campus: Urban
- Website: www.citystgeorges.ac.uk/about/schools/health-sciences

The School of Health and Medical Sciences at City St George's, University of London, is composed of the former St George's school of health and medical sciences and City University's school of health and psychological sciences. City University had previously incorporated the St Bartholomew School of Nursing and Midwifery and the Charterhouse College of Radiography.

The school offers undergraduate, postgraduate and research degrees as well as continuing personal and professional development for those entering or working in health and community-related professions. Disciplines covered include nursing (child, adult and mental health), midwifery, health management, research and policy, speech, language and communication therapy and science diagnostic radiography, therapeutic radiography, ultrasound and optometry.

== History ==
The department of nursing and midwifery dates its history to the schools of St Bartholomew's Hospital and the Royal London Hospital, the former of which began training in 1867, formalised into a School in 1877. These merged in 1994 to become the St Bartholomew School of Nursing and Midwifery. In 1995 the new school was incorporated into City, University of London, along with the Charterhouse College of Radiography.

== Campus ==
The school is based at St George's Hospital in Tooting and City St George's main campus at Northampton Square.
