= City Law School =

Law school of City St George's, University of London

Coordinates: 51°31′38″N 0°6′20″W

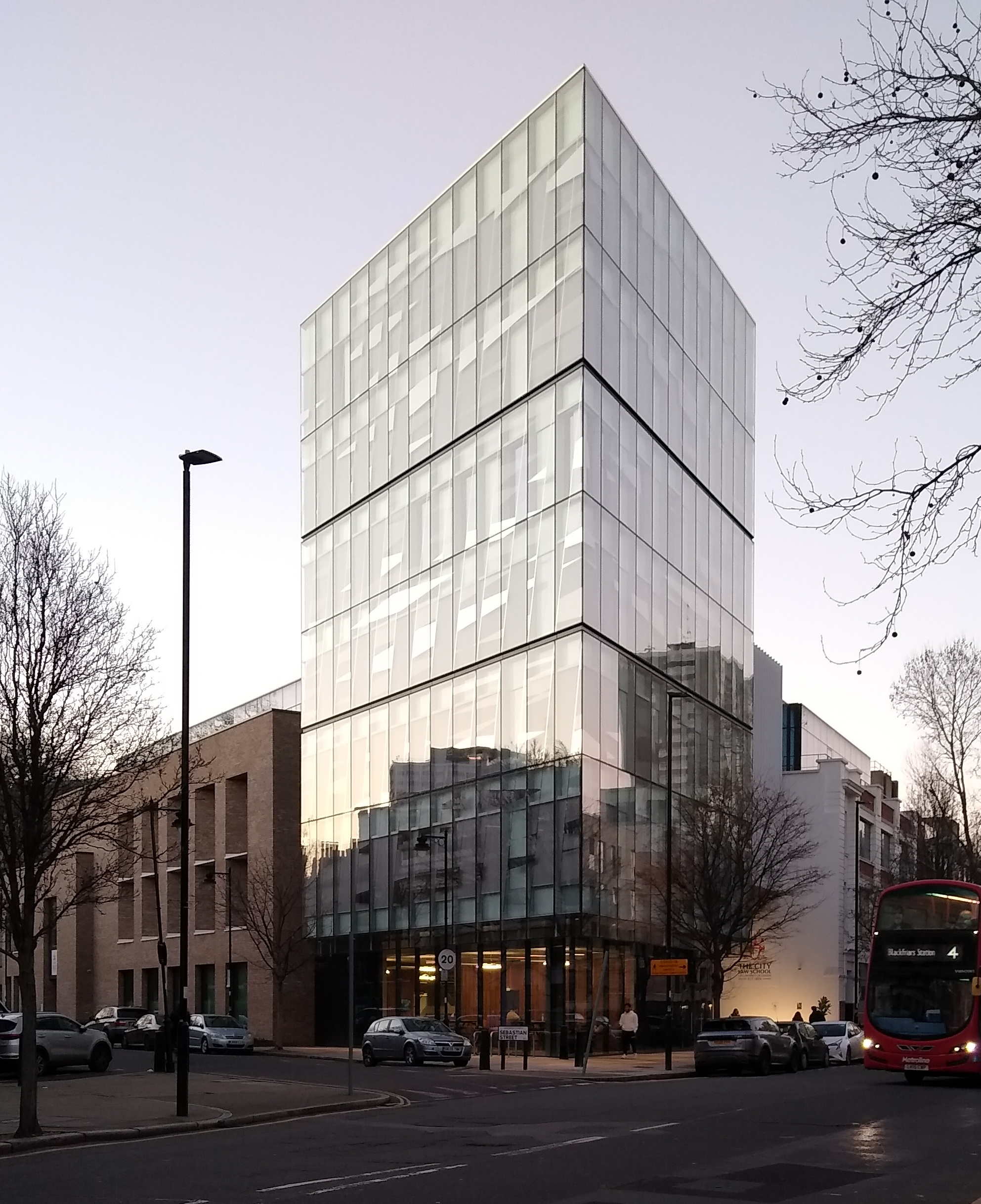
- Parent school: City St George's, University of London
- Established: 1852 (founding of the Inns of Court School of Law); 1894 (founding of the Northampton Institute)
- School type: Public law school
- Dean: Richard Ashcroft
- Location: London, England
- Website: www.citystgeorges.ac.uk/about/schools/law

The City Law School is a law school in London, England, and it is one of the six schools of City St George's, University of London. The law school traces its origins to the Inns of Court School of Law (ICSL), which was founded in 1852. The ICSL became part of City in 2001, and it is now known as The City Law School. Until 1997, the ICSL had a monopoly on the provision of the Bar Vocational Course (BVC; formerly known as the Bar Professional Training Course, or BPTC, and now known as Bar Vocational Studies, or BVS), the obligatory professional training for would-be barristers in England and Wales, before they commence pupillage.

The school was previously divided into two sections across two campuses – the Gloucester Building (west of City's Northampton Square campus), where the academic instruction section was based, and Grays Inn Place, where the professional legal training programmes were based. From September 2021, a new building for The City Law School was developed on Sebastian Street, to the east of Northampton Square.

It provides legal education at all stages, including a three-year undergraduate Bachelor of Laws (LLB) programme, a two-year Graduate Entry LLB degree programme, the Master of Laws (LLM) and the Graduate Diploma in Law (GDL) course (formerly known as the Common Professional Examination). The latter programme enjoys a nationwide reputation as one of Britain's elite qualifying diploma courses for non-law graduates. The school also teaches the Solicitors' Practice Programme (SPP) for would-be solicitors. In 2007, it received the highest grading from the Law Society of England and Wales for its academic provision.

Approximately 1600 students are enrolled at The City Law School each year.

== History ==
The Inns of Court School of Law (often abbreviated as ICSL) was founded by the Council of Legal Education in 1852. It was a professional legal training institution based for 100 years at Lincoln's Inn and then at Gray's Inn in London. Until 1997, the ICSL had a monopoly on the provision of the Bar Vocational Course (now the Bar Vocational Studies (BVS), the obligatory, pre-pupillage training course for intending barristers in England and Wales. Before that time, the Inns of Court were responsible for the education of those intending to become barristers. There was call during the nineteenth century for the education of barristers to be unified and thus the Council of Legal Education was formed, and the ICSL founded. Since 2001, the ICSL has been part of City, University of London.

The Council of Legal Education (CLE) was established by Resolutions of the Inns of Court in 1852. The CLE initially met in the library of Lincoln's Inn. In 1903 it moved to 15 Old Square, Lincoln's Inn. In 1947, the CLE moved to 7 Stone Buildings, where it was able to provide lecture rooms, and other facilities for students. In 1964, the CLE acquired premises in Gray's Inn. In 1967, the Inns of Court School of Law (ICSL) was formally established at 4 Gray's Inn Place. The first dean, Charles Morrison, was appointed in 1969.

When the ICSL was first created, each of the four Inns of Court were required to provide two rooms for teaching purposes. Until just after the Second World War, the ICSL was located in Lincoln's Inn. In the 1950s, a purpose-built building was constructed at 4 Gray's Inn Place (within Gray's Inn) and the school relocated there. Shortly after that, Atkin Building in Gray's Inn was secured and then in the 1980s a further building was acquired for the ICSL in Princeton Street, formerly the London studios of Yorkshire Television.

The City Law School, successor to the ICSL is now located at City St George's.

The former site of the ICSL in Gray's Inn Place is now used by an independent preparatory school.

=== Rebranding ===
In July 2008, the ICSL brand was dropped and replaced with The City Law School brand. Replacement of the ICSL brand was phased in gradually. Initially, both logos were used on the school stationery. In the 2007–2008 academic year, school publications bore The City Law School name with the ICSL logo. Now, The City Law School logo is used exclusively.

=== ICSL emblem ===
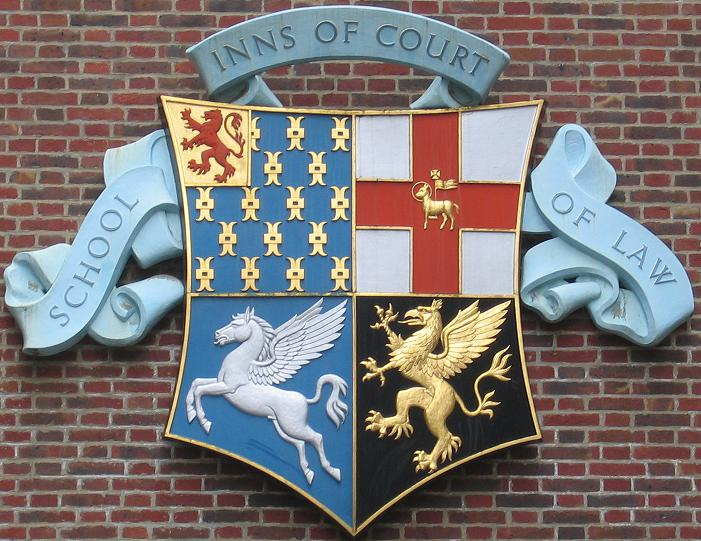
The ICSL emblem

The ICSL emblem used to be displayed at the front entrance to Gray's Inn Place. The emblem consisted of the combined coats of arms of all four Inns of Court, namely (in order) Lincoln's Inn, the Middle Temple, the Inner Temple and Gray's Inn. The Council of Legal Education used a similar form of emblem.

== Academic courses ==
The School teaches the Graduate Diploma in Law (GDL) for graduates who wish to qualify as a lawyer without a law degree.

The School also offers the Graduate Entry LLB (Hons); a senior status law degree which allows non-law graduates to achieve an LLB law degree in two years rather than the usual three.

The School also offers a qualifying undergraduate, three-year LLB (Hons) degree.

The City Law Society has a student led society at City, University of London, that caters for social and professional events aimed at both Law and non-Law students. It is one of the largest societies at City Students' Union. As such the City Law Society hosts an annual Law ball which is attended by over 200 students of City, University of London. The City Law Society also runs an annual City Law School Journal (that was founded by students).

== Notable people and alumni ==
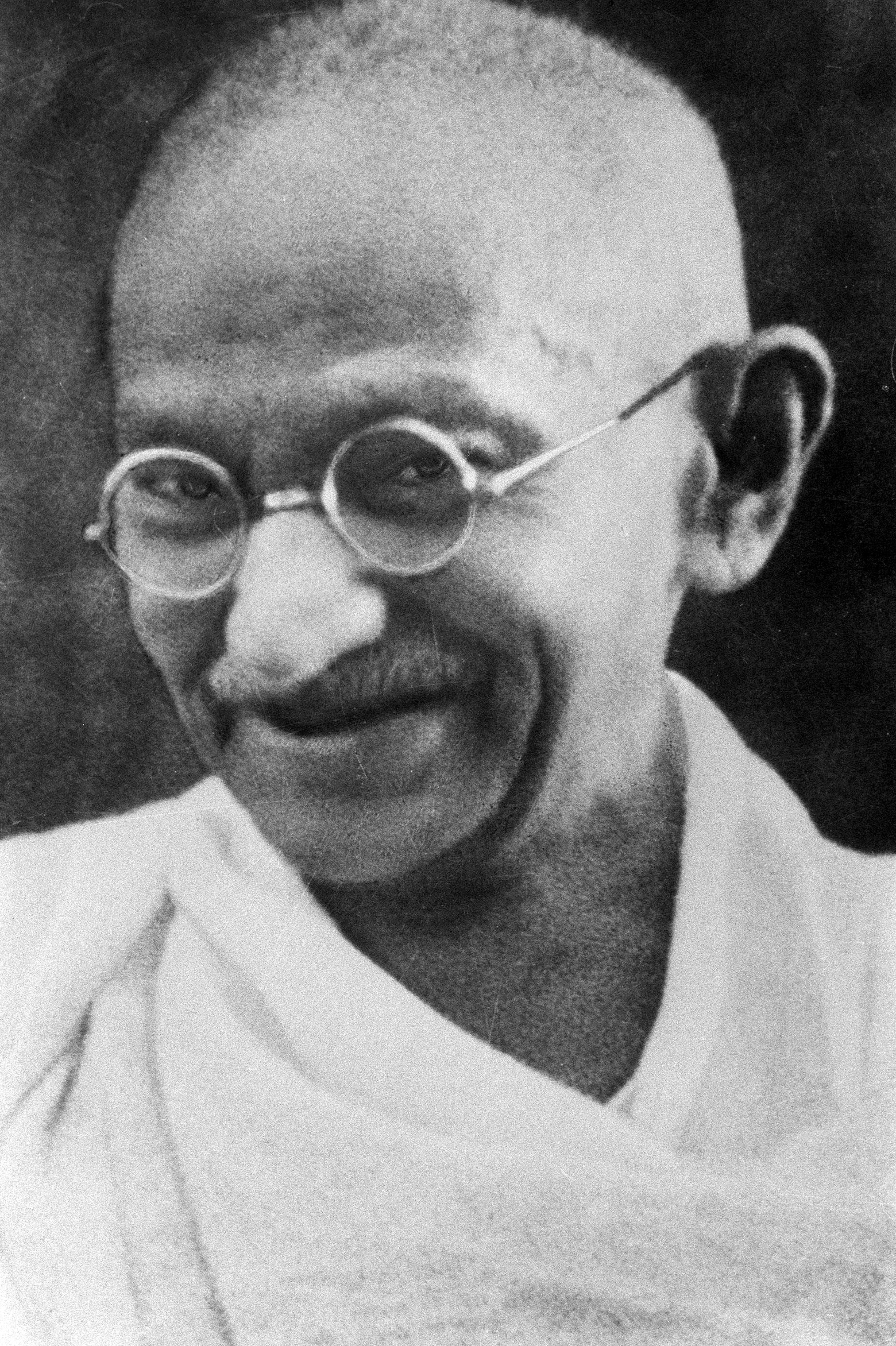
Mahatma Gandhi

Alumni include many judges, King's Counsel, and distinguished academics. Others who went on to achieve the highest distinction include Mohandas Gandhi (leader of the Indian Independence Movement), Muhammad Ali Jinnah (founder of Pakistan, first Governor-General of Pakistan), a number of British Prime Ministers (H. H. Asquith, Margaret Thatcher, and Tony Blair), and Ghanaian presidents Nana Akufo-Addo and Kwame Nkrumah.

The current Executive Dean of The City Law School is Professor Richard Ashcroft.
