= Manuel Soria González =

- Manuel, as portrayed by his brother Nicolás in El campeón (1910)
- Born: 23 May 1890; Avilés, Spain
- Died: 13 February 1967 (aged 76); Avilés, Spain
- Occupations: cyclist, painter & teacher

Manuel Soria González (23 May 1890 – 13 February 1967) was a Spanish painter, art educator and competitive cyclist from Avilés, Asturias. A member of the Soria family of artists, he was the younger brother of the realist painter Nicolás Soria González. Although primarily known as a painter and teacher, Manuel Soria also participated in the growing cycling culture of early twentieth-century Spain and became the subject of his brother’s well-known 1910 painting El campeón (“The Champion”).

== Early life ==
Born in Avilés, the youngest of several brothers in a family of painters headed by Policarpo Soria Álvarez. He studied at La Escuela de Artes y Oficios of Avilés, where in 1905, at the age of fifteen, he received the Extraordinary Prize for Painting and Decoration. Alongside his artistic training, he developed an interest in sport, particularly cycling, which was becoming increasingly popular in Spain before the First World War. He competed in regional cycling events and won several prizes during his youth.

== El campeón ==
His sporting activities inspired his brother Nicolás Soria’s painting El campeón (1910), an oil portrait depicting Manuel in cycling attire beside his bicycle. The work has been regarded as an unusual and modern representation of athletic culture in Spanish painting of the period, reflecting the emergence of cycling as a popular competitive sport in Spain during the early twentieth century. The painting was exhibited by the Museo de Bellas Artes de Asturias in 2018 as part of its La Obra Invitada programme.

== Later life and death ==
In 1912, Soria obtained a position as drawing teacher at the School of Arts and Crafts in Avilés. He remained associated with the institution for decades and became its director in 1950. From 1928 onward he also taught drawing at the Carreño Miranda Secondary School and later at the School of San Fernando. In addition, he served as professor at the School of Industrial Engineering and the Polytechnic Institute. Throughout his career he participated in several regional and national art exhibitions. Manuel Soria González spent most of his life in Avilés, where he died on 13 February 1967.
