= Sharon Mascall =

Australian journalist

Sharon Mascall (also known as Sharon Mascall-Dare) is a British-Australian journalist, broadcaster and writer based in Adelaide, South Australia.

== Early life and education ==
Born in Hertfordshire, UK, in 1970, she studied Modern Languages at Wadham College, Oxford University before gaining a postgraduate diploma in Broadcast Journalism from City University, London.

== Career ==
She worked for the BBC as a broadcast journalist and presenter from 1994 to 1999, specialising in European affairs. In 1999, Mascall moved to Melbourne, Australia, where she worked as a freelance journalist and broadcaster for ABC Radio and later as a producer and presenter for the Australian Broadcasting Corporation. She presented Radio Australia's news coverage of the bombing of Afghanistan in 2001 and the outbreak of the Iraq War in 2003.

After moving to Australia, she continued to produce radio features for the BBC and was a regular contributor to Melbourne's The Age from 1999 to 2003. In 2003 she moved to Adelaide, where she continued to work as a freelance producer and reporter for the BBC and as a writer.

On 26 January 2023, Dr Sharon Lorraine Mascall-Dare was included in the Australia Day 2023 Honours List. She was awarded the Medal of the Order of Australia (OAM) in the General Division for "service to media as a journalist."

== Media awards ==
In 2006, Mascall was a finalist in the South Australian Media Awards . In the 2007 South Australian Media Awards, she won awards for Best Freelance Contribution, and Best Radio Feature, Documentary or Broadcast Special for the BBC World Service documentary 'Wildfire'. She was also voted Best South Australian Radio Broadcaster . In the 2009 awards, she again won the award for Best Freelance Contribution . In 2010, she won Best Radio Documentary, Best Freelance Contribution for the BBC World Service documentary 'The Wildlife Smugglers' and was again named Best Radio Broadcaster in recognition of her investigative reporting . In 2011, she was commended by the Walkley Awards judging panel for her documentary series 'The Big House'(Part 1 and Part 2 ), broadcast on BBC World Service and ABC Radio in July and August 2011 . In the 2012 SA Media Awards, Mascall won the award for Best Radio Current Affairs, and for the third time was voted the Best Radio Broadcaster .

Internationally, she was nominated for an Amnesty International Media Award in 2008 in recognition of her reporting on human rights. In 2013, her BBC World Service documentary 'Anzac' won bronze (for best history program) and silver (for best writing) awards at the International Radio Awards in New York . Co-presented with the Australian author and historian, Thomas Keneally, 'Anzac' was also rebroadcast as part of the ABC's coverage of Anzac Day in 2013 and was a finalist in the 2013 United Nations Association of Australia Media Awards for promotion of multicultural issues .

On Anzac Day 2015, Mascall co-presented ABC Radio's live coverage of the Anzac Day march in Adelaide alongside ABC 891 Weekends presenter Ashley Walsh. Later that year, she was named on the South Australian Women's Honour Roll 2015 in recognition of her services to the media and journalism education, in particular her coverage of Indigenous Affairs and the Anzac Centenary.

== Academic career ==
As an academic researcher, Mascall's main areas of interest are journalism ethics, ethnographic journalism and media coverage of Anzac Day. She is the author of the 'Anzac Day Media Style Guide' distributed online by RSL National , and co-author of 'Not for Glory - A century of service by medical women to the Australian Army and its Allies' (Boolarong Press, Brisbane, 2014) . Since 2014, she has held academic status as an Adjunct Associate Professor, both at the University of Canberra (2014–17), and the University of South Australia (2017-).

== Military career ==
In 2013, Mascall was appointed as a Commissioned Officer in the Australian Army Reserves, and she currently serves as a Military Public Affairs Officer (MPAO) in the Australian Army Public Relations Corps at the rank of Lieutenant Colonel. Based in Adelaide, she presented and co-produced the Australian Army's 'Training and Doctrine Podcast' in 2016 and during her deployment to Iraq with Task Group Taji IV from 2016–17, she produced and presented two series for the 'Australian Defence Force on Operations Podcast'. In 2018, she joined the production team of the Australian veterans' podcast series Life on the Line. In her civilian life, she served as a member of the South Australian Government Veterans' Advisory Council from 2015–21 and is chair of the StoryRight veterans employment support program that she founded in collaboration with like-minded veterans in 2018.
