= Museo de Bellas Artes de Asturias =

Coordinates: 43.3617°N 5.84372°W

Museum of Fine Arts of Asturias
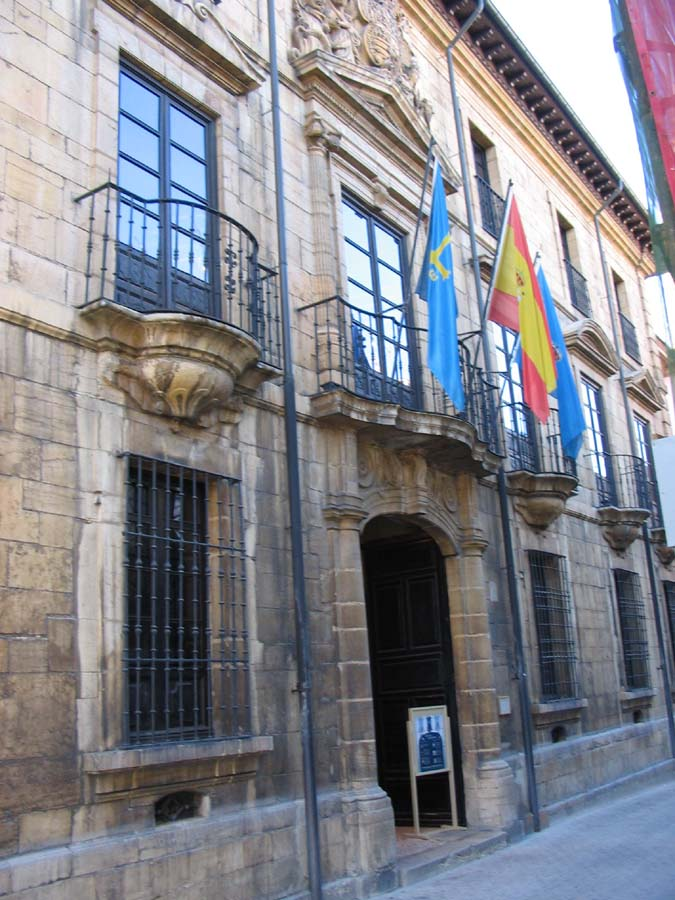
- Established: 19 May 1980
- Location: Santa Ana 1–3, 33003 Oviedo, Asturias, Spain
- Website: www.museobbaa.com

The Museum of Fine Arts of Asturias (Spanish: Museo de Bellas Artes de Asturias; Asturian: Muséu de Belles Artes d'Asturies) is a museum in Oviedo, Asturias, Spain. It is situated within three buildings: the Palacio de Velarde, the House of Oviedo-Portal, and the House of Solís-Carbajal. The museum was conceived on 13 June 1844, by Royal Decree, and inaugurated 19 May 1980, from the art collection owned by the former province of Oviedo. It now depends on funding from the Culture Department of Asturias, and the City of Oviedo.

An expansion project is underway by the museum's architect, Francisco Beloqui Mangado.

María López-Fanjul y Díez del Corral has been the director of this museum since December 2025.

== Collection ==
The fine arts collection includes up to 10,000 inventoried items, with 350–400 on public display at one time. There are paintings by Spanish artists, highlighting those from Asturias, as well as those from foreign countries, such as Italian (like Umberto Pettinicchio) and Flemish painters. Sculptures, photographs, glass objects, and earthenware are also part of the permanent collection.
