= Andy Merrifield =

English urban theorist (born 1960)

Andy Merrifield (born 26 June 26 1960) is a British Marxist urban theorist.

== Background ==
He was born in Liverpool. and attended Quarry Bank School until 1976. He left school at 16 and did office jobs and travelled. He graduated in geography, philosophy and sociology from Liverpool Polytechnic in the mid-1980s. Merrifield received his PhD in geography from Oxford University in 1993, supervised by David Harvey. Merrifield spent most of his early career teaching geography at the University of Southampton and King's College London, before moving to Clark University, USA in 2000. He was denied tenure in 2003, on grounds of collegiality, having chosen to live 178 miles away in Manhattan. He moved with his partner to Lavoûte-Chilhac, south of Clermont-Ferrand in the Auvergne in France as an "independent scholar". He returned to the academic system in 2011. In 2011-12 he was a Leverhulme Fellow at the University of Manchester and then Supernumerary Fellow in Human Geography at Murray Edwards College, University of Cambridge.

== Personal life ==
He is married to food systems specialist Corinna Hawkes. They have a daughter together, named Lily Rose Merrifield, born in 2007, in the French city of Issoire.

== Scholarship ==
Merrifield is a prolific writer and was a leading proponent of the idea of 'The Right to the City', a phrase associated with Henri Lefebvre. In later work he supports the 'politics of the encounter' in a globalised world, rather than the more restrictive 'right' to urban space. He draws heavily on the work of Lefebvre and his theories. He published Marx Dead and Alive: Reading Capital in Precarious Times in 2020.

Merrifield has published articles in various left-wing publications and mainstream magazines and newspapers, including New Left Review, Adbusters and The Nation.

A departure was signalled by his 2008 book, The Wisdom of Donkeys, completed after his departure from academia in the US. It offers insights into a slowing of life and having time for reflection, while undertaking a journey on foot with a donkey through France's Auvergne region. The book has proven popular worldwide: for example, copies are on display at the gift shop at the Grand Canyon Village in Arizona. Subsequent books reflecting on life and people are listed below.

Merrifield's works have impacted educational philosophy. His theory of the encounter has inspired pedagogical developments by David I. Backer, while his work on magical Marxism has inspired Derek R. Ford to develop a magical Marxist pedagogy, which entails a critique of Merrifield.

== Awards and honors ==
- 2012 Bread and Roses Award, shortlist, Magical Marxism

== Books ==
- The Urbanization of Injustice (ed. with Erik Swyngedouw, NYU Press, 1997)
- Dialectical Urbanism (2002)
- Metromarxism: A Marxist Tale of the City (2002) (Turkish, Phoenix Yayinevi, 2012)
- Guy Debord (Reaktion Books, 2005) (Chinese, University of Beijing Press, 2011)
- Henri Lefebvre: A Critical Introduction (Routledge, 2006)
- The Wisdom of Donkeys: Finding Tranquility in a Chaotic World (Bloomsbury, 2008) (Die Weisheit der Esel Ruhe finden in einer chaotischen Welt. München Nymphenburger 2009; L'âne de Schubert. Actes Sud, 2008)
- Magical Marxism: Subversive Politics and the Imagination (Pluto Press, 2011)
- John Berger (Reaktion Books, 2012)
- The Politics of the Encounter: Urban Theory and Protest under Planetary Urbanization. (University of Georgia Press, 2013)
- The New Urban Question (Pluto Press, 2014)
- The Amateur: The Pleasures of Doing What You Love (Verso, 2017)
- What We Talk About When We Talk About Cities (and Love) (OR Books, 2018)
- Marx Dead and Alive (Monthly Review Press, New York, 2020)
