= City St George's, University of London =

Public research university in London, England

- City University coat of arms
- Motto: To Serve Mankind
- Type: Public research university
- Established: 1834 – St George's Hospital Medical School 1838 – St George's affiliated to the University of London; 1852 – Inns of Court School of Law; 1894 – Northampton Institute; 1966 – City gained university status by royal charter 2016 – City became a constituent college of the University of London 2024 – City merged with St George's, University of London
- Parent institution: University of London
- Affiliations: University of London; Universities UK
- Endowment: £11.4 million (2025)
- Budget: £487.8 million (2024/25)
- Chancellor: Anne, Princess Royal (as Chancellor of the University of London)
- President: Sir Anthony Finkelstein
- Rector: Lord Mayor of the City of London (ex officio)
- Students: 21,735 (2022/23)
- Undergraduates: 13,590 (2022/23)
- Postgraduates: 8,145 (2022/23)
- Location: London, England; 51.5278°N 0.1023°W
- Campus: Urban
Colours
Red and white
- Website: citystgeorges.ac.uk

City St George's, University of London is a public research university in London, England, and a member institution of the University of London. Founded in 1894 as the Northampton Institute, it officially became a university when the City University was created by royal charter in 1966. The Inns of Court School of Law, which merged with City in 2001, was established in 1852.

City joined the federal University of London on 1 September 2016, becoming City, University of London. In 2024, St George's, University of London, which was established in 1834, merged with the university, with the combined institution adopting its name City St George's, University of London the following year.

City St George's has strong links with the City of London, and the Lord Mayor of London serves as the university's rector. The university has Central London campuses spanning the London Borough of Islington; the City of London; and the London Borough of Wandsworth. It is organised into six schools. The annual income of the institution for 2024–25 was £487.8 million, of which £24.4 million was from research grants and contracts, with an expenditure of £415.3 million.

The university is a member of Universities UK. Alumni of City St George's include members of Parliament of the United Kingdom, politicians and CEOs.

== History ==
=== Origins ===
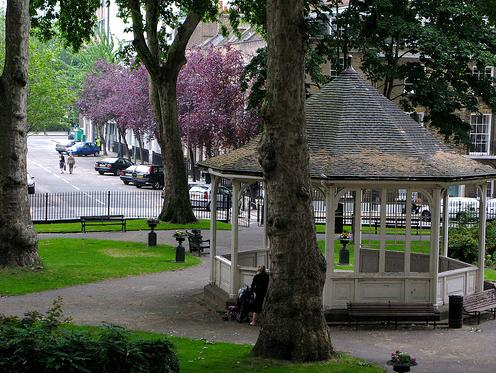
Northampton Square in front of the main university building

City St George's traces its origin to the Northampton Institute. This was named after the 4th Marquess of Northampton who donated the land on which the institute was built, between Northampton Square and St John Street in Islington. The institute was established to provide for the education and welfare of the local population. It was constituted under the City of London Parochial Charities Act 1883, with the objective of "the promotion of the industrial skill, general knowledge, health and well-being of young men and women belonging to the poorer classes".

Northampton Polytechnic Institute was an institute of technology in Clerkenwell, London, founded in 1894. Its first principal was Robert Mullineux Walmsley. The six original departments at the institute were applied physics and electrical engineering; artistic crafts; domestic economy and women's trades; electro-chemistry; horology; and mechanical engineering and metal trades.

Other 19th century institutions that would later become part of the university included the Inns of Court School of Law (founded 1852) and St George's Hospital Medical School (founded 1834).

=== 20th century ===
A separate technical optics department was established in 1903–04. In 1909, the first students qualified for University of London BSc degrees in engineering as internal students. The institute has been involved in aeronautics education since that year, and the school of engineering and mathematical sciences celebrated the centenary of aeronautics at City in 2009. Frederick Handley Page was a lecturer in aeronautics at the institute. The Handley Page Type A, the first powered aircraft designed and built by him, ended up as an instructional airframe at the school. In 1957, the institute was designated a "College of Advanced Technology".

The boxing competition at the 1908 Olympic Games was held at the institute. Arthur George Cocksedge, a British gymnast who competed in the 1920 Summer Olympics, was a member of the Northampton Polytechnic Institute's gymnastics club and was champion of the United Kingdom in 1920. In 1937 Maurice Dennis of the Northampton Polytechnic ABC was the 1937 ABA Middleweight Champion. The novelist Eric Ambler studied engineering at the institute.

The institute's involvement in information science began in 1961, with the introduction of a course on "Collecting and Communicating Scientific Knowledge". City received its royal charter in 1966, becoming "The City University" to reflect the institution's close links with the City of London. The Apollo 15 astronauts visited City in 1971, and presented the vice-chancellor, James Sharp Tait, with a piece of heat shield from the Apollo 15 rocket.

In October 1995, it was announced that City University would merge with both the St Bartholomew School of Nursing & Midwifery and the Charterhouse College of Radiography, doubling the number of students in City's institute of health sciences to around 2,500.

=== 21st century ===
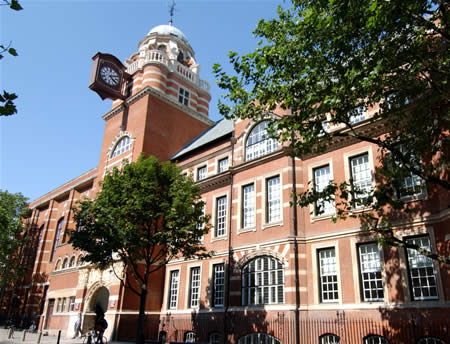
The Grade II listed College Building

The university formed a strategic alliance with Queen Mary, University of London, in April 2001. In May 2001, a fire in the college building gutted the fourth-floor offices and roof. In August 2001 City and the Inns of Court School of Law agreed to merge. Following a donation from Sir John Cass's Foundation, a new building was built at 106 Bunhill Row for the business school.

A new £23 million building to house the school of social sciences and the department of language and communication science was opened in 2004. The reconstruction and redevelopment of the university's Grade II listed college building (following the fire in 2001) was completed in July 2006.

In 2007, the school of arts received a £10m building refurbishment. A new students' union venue opened in October 2008 called "TEN squared", which provides a hub for students to socialise in during the day and hosts a wide range of evening entertainment including club nights, society events and quiz nights.

In January 2010, premises were shared with the University of East Anglia London, following City's partnership with INTO University Partnerships. City later resumed its own international foundation programme to prepare students for their pre-university year. City was ranked among the top 30 higher education institutions in the UK by the Times Higher Education Table of Tables.

In 2011, it was announced that the current halls of residence and Saddler's Sports Centre would be closed and demolished for rebuilding. The new student halls and sports facility, now known as CitySport, opened in 2015.

In September 2016 the City University became a member institution of the federal University of London and changed its name to City, University of London.

In 2024, St George's, University of London merged with the university with the combined institution rebranding as City St George's, University of London the following year.

== Campus ==
A map showing the location of the main campus of City St George's, University of London, in central London

City St George's has sites throughout London, with the main campus located at Northampton Square in the Finsbury area of Islington. The Rhind Building which houses the School of Arts and Social Sciences is directly west of Northampton Square. A few buildings of the main campus are located in nearby Goswell Road in Clerkenwell.

Other academic sites are:

- City Law School on Sebastian Street, Islington.
- Bayes Business School in St Luke's, Islington, and at 200 Aldersgate in Smithfield, City of London
- St George's Hospital Medical School in St George's Hospital, Tooting
- City St George's International Study Centre in Spitalfields, Tower Hamlets

=== Halls of residence ===
City St George's offers accommodation in eight halls of residence. Seven of these are in Clerkenwell and one in Tooting. Horton Halls in Tooting and four of the Clerkenwell halls are for undergraduates, while three of the Clerkenwell halls are for postgraduates (with one, Alliance House, also accepting continuing students).

=== Sustainability ===
City St George's ranked joint 88th (2:2 class) out of the 147 universities in the 2025/26 People & Planet league table of the most sustainable UK universities.

People & Planet's Fossil Free Scorecard report, drawn from Freedom of Information requests, found in 2016 that City (as it then was) had not made a public commitment to fossil fuel divestment. City St George's announced on 4 July 2023 that it was divesting its investments from fossil fuel producers.

== Organisation and administration ==
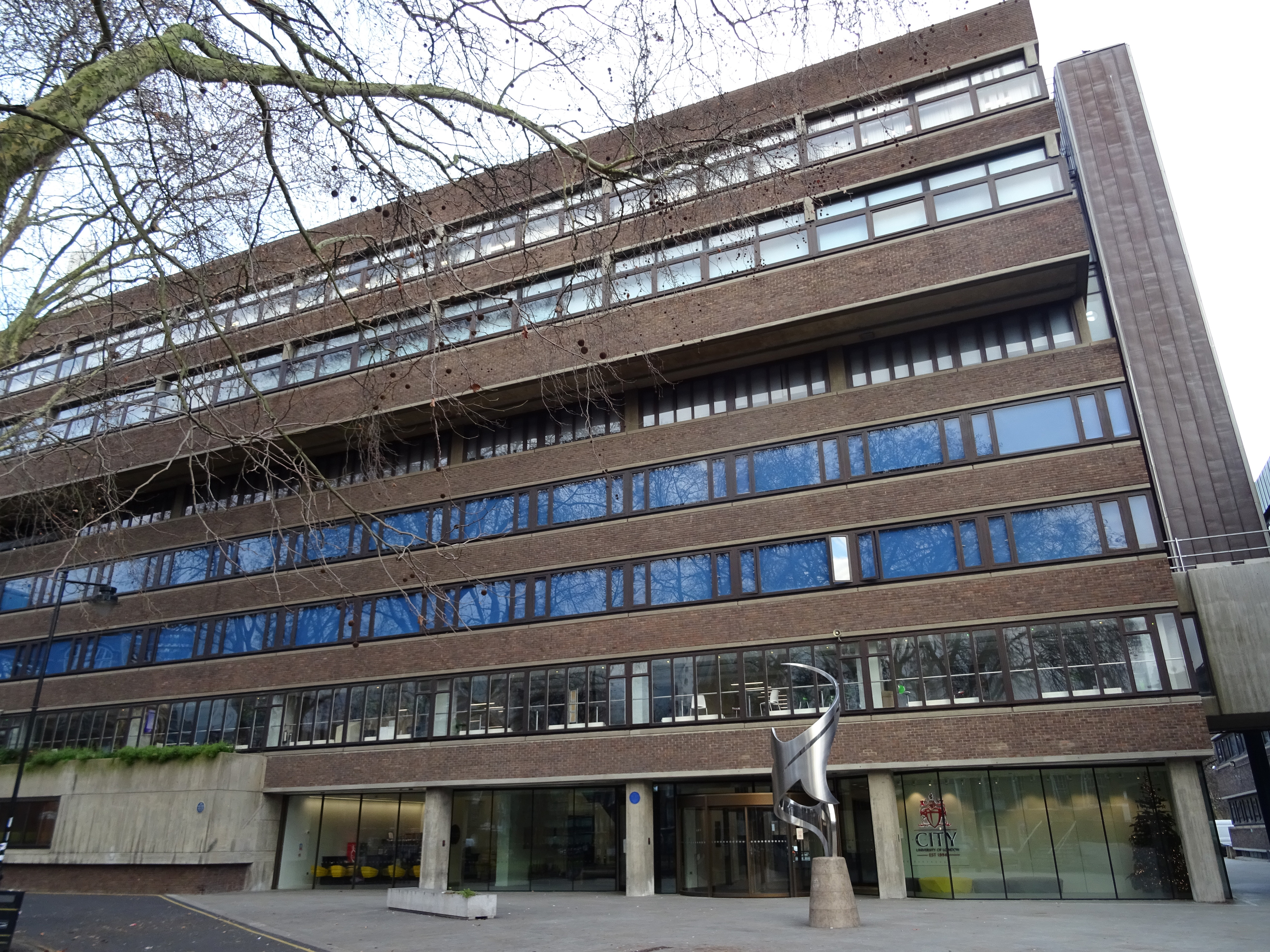
The main entrance of City St George's, University of London, in Northampton Square. The entrance was substantially remodelled in 2017 and opened by the chancellor, The Princess Royal

=== Governance ===
There are two bodies established by the royal charter that participate in the governance of the university. The council is the governing body of the university. It consists of the chair, the president, independent members, and staff and student members. The senate is responsible for academic governance.

=== Senior leadership ===
The chancellor of the University of London, the ceremonial head of the university, is Anne, Princess Royal. City St George's ceremonial head is the rector, a post held ex-officio by the Lord Mayor of London, elected annually in November.

The president (named in the royal charter as the vice-chancellor and president) is the principal academic and administrative officer and has been Sir Anthony Finkelstein since June 2021. The senior leadership team assist and advise the president in the "strategic management, development and promotion of the University". It includes a deputy president and provost, three vice-presidents, the six executive deans of the schools, the deputy president for operations (chief operating officer), the chief financial officer and the chief people officer.

=== Finances ===
City St George's had a total group income for 2024/25 of £490.0 million and a total expenditure of £415.4 million. Of the income, £333.5 million (68%) was from teaching, £40.7 million (8%) was from research, £5.7 million (1%) was residential income and £110.2 (22%) was other non-residential income. The university (as opposed to the group) had an income of £487.8 million in 2024/25. The income for 2024/25 included a book gain of £73.5 million for the group (£71.4 million for the university) from the merger with St George's, University of London, with the difference between the 'group' and 'university' figures being due to the inclusion of the Eleanor Peel Chair of Geriatric Medicine in the former. After removal of pension fund movements and gain from the merger, City St George's reported an operating surplus of £1.3 million in 2024/25.

The group had a total endowment as of 31 July 2025 of £13.2 million, made up of £11.3 million in the university's endowment and £1.9 million in the Eleanor Peel Chair of Geriatric Medicine endowment.

=== Schools ===
City St George's, University of London, is organised into six schools:

- City Law School, incorporating the centre for legal studies and the Inns of Court School of Law
- School of health and medical sciences, incorporating St George's Hospital Medical School and St Bartholomew School of Nursing & Midwifery
- Bayes Business School (formerly Cass Business School)
- School of communication and creativity, including the department of journalism
- School of policy and global affairs
- School of science and technology

The Finsbury Institute sits alongside the schools in the university's organisation as a dedicated public policy hub.

== Academic profile ==
=== Courses ===
City St George's, University of London, offers bachelor's, master's, and doctoral degrees as well as certificates and diplomas at both undergraduate and postgraduate level.

The City St George's International Study Centre is run by INTO University Partnerships and provides programmes to prepare international students to study at the university.

=== Partnerships and collaborations ===
City St George's is a core member of the Cultural Capital Exchange, originally established as the London Centre for Arts and Cultural Exchange in 2005, a company focusing on the exchange of knowledge between the universities and London's arts and cultural sectors.

City St George's is also a partner of UCL Partners, a health innovation company in London.

=== Library ===
City Research Online is the open-access repository for research produced by City St George's staff and research students.

=== Reputation and rankings ===
Rankings
National rankings
- Complete (2027): 59
- Guardian (2027): 104
- Times / Sunday Times (2027): 56

Global rankings
- ARWU (2026): 601–700
- QS (2027): 361=
- THE (2026): 301–250

City St George's was ranked 59th overall nationally by The Complete University Guide 2027, but in the top ten for optometry, ophthalmics and orthoptics (tenth). It was also ranked 104th overall nationally by The Guardian's university guide 2027, but in the top ten for anatomy and physiology (sixth), drama and dance (second) and music (ninth).

== Student life ==
=== Students' union ===
The City St George's Students' Union is run primarily by students through four elected sabbatical officers, the chief executive and an elected assembly (composed of current students), with oversight by a trustee board. The students' union provides support, representation, facilities, services, entertainment and activities for its members.

The students' union manages most aspects relating to students' societies, such as booking spaces for events on campus, holding funds and distributing grants, and providing training to their committees.

=== Student media ===
City St George's has two student-run media outlets, including Carrot Radio, which was co-founded by journalism postgraduates Jordan Gass-Pooré and Winston Lo in the autumn of 2018. Carrot Radio records weekday podcasts. The second is the student-led online magazine, Carrot Magazine. They released their first print magazine in December 2017.

== Notable people ==
=== Notable alumni ===
==== Government, politics and society ====
- Christos Staikouras – Finance minister of Greece from 2019 to 2023
- Sir Robert Chote – chief of the Office for Budget Responsibility; former director of Institute for Fiscal Studies
- Ali Dizaei – former police commander
- Sir James Dutton – Royal Marine general and former deputy commander of the International Security Assistance Force
- Chloë Fox – Australian politician, former Labor MP for the South Australian electoral district of Bright
- James Hart – Commissioner of the City of London Police
- David Heath – Politician and Liberal Democrat member of parliament for Somerton and Frome
- Syed Kamall – Conservative Party politician and Member of the European Parliament for the London European Parliament constituency
- Sandro Marcos – Member of the Philippine House of Representatives, eldest son of Bongbong Marcos, President of the Republic of the Philippines
- Barbara Mensah – Judge
- Liu Mingkang – Chinese politician and businessman, current chairman of the China Banking Regulatory Commission, former Vice-Governor of the China Development Bank
- Patrick O'Flynn – UK Independence Party then Social Democratic Party MEP
- Stav Shaffir – Youngest member of the Israeli Knesset, leader of the social justice movement
- Aris Spiliotopoulos – Minister of Greek Tourism

==== Arts, science and academia ====
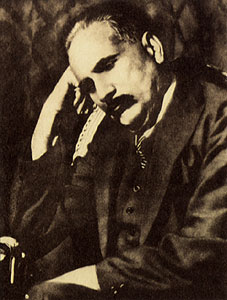
Muhammad Iqbal

- Darshana Rajendran - Indian actress
- María López-Fanjul y Díez del Corral – Spanish art historian and director of the Museum of Fine Arts of Asturias
- L. Bruce Archer – British mechanical engineer and professor of Design Research at the Royal College of Art
- Hüseyin Şehitoğlu – Turkish Professor of Mechanical Science and Engineering, former department head, University of Illinois
- Susan Bickley – Mezzo-soprano in opera and classical music
- Jerry Fishenden – Technologist, former Microsoft national technology officer for the UK
- Julia Gomelskaya – Ukrainian contemporary music composer, professor of Odesa State Music Academy in Ukraine
- Norman Gowar – Professor of Mathematics at the Open University and principal of Royal Holloway College, University of London
- Clare Hammond – Concert pianist
- David Hirsh – Academic and sociologist
- John Hodge – NASA engineer
- John Loder – Sound engineer, record producer and founder of Southern Studios, as well as a former member of EXIT
- Sharon Maguire – Director of Bridget Jones's Diary
- Bernard Miles – Actor and founder of the Mermaid Theatre.
- John Palmer – Instrumental and electroacoustic music composer
- Ziauddin Sardar – Academic and scholar of Islamic issues, commissioner of the Equality and Human Rights Commission
- Theresa Wallach – Pioneer female engineer, motorcycle adventurer, author, educator and entrepreneur, holder of Brooklands Gold Star.

==== Business and finance ====
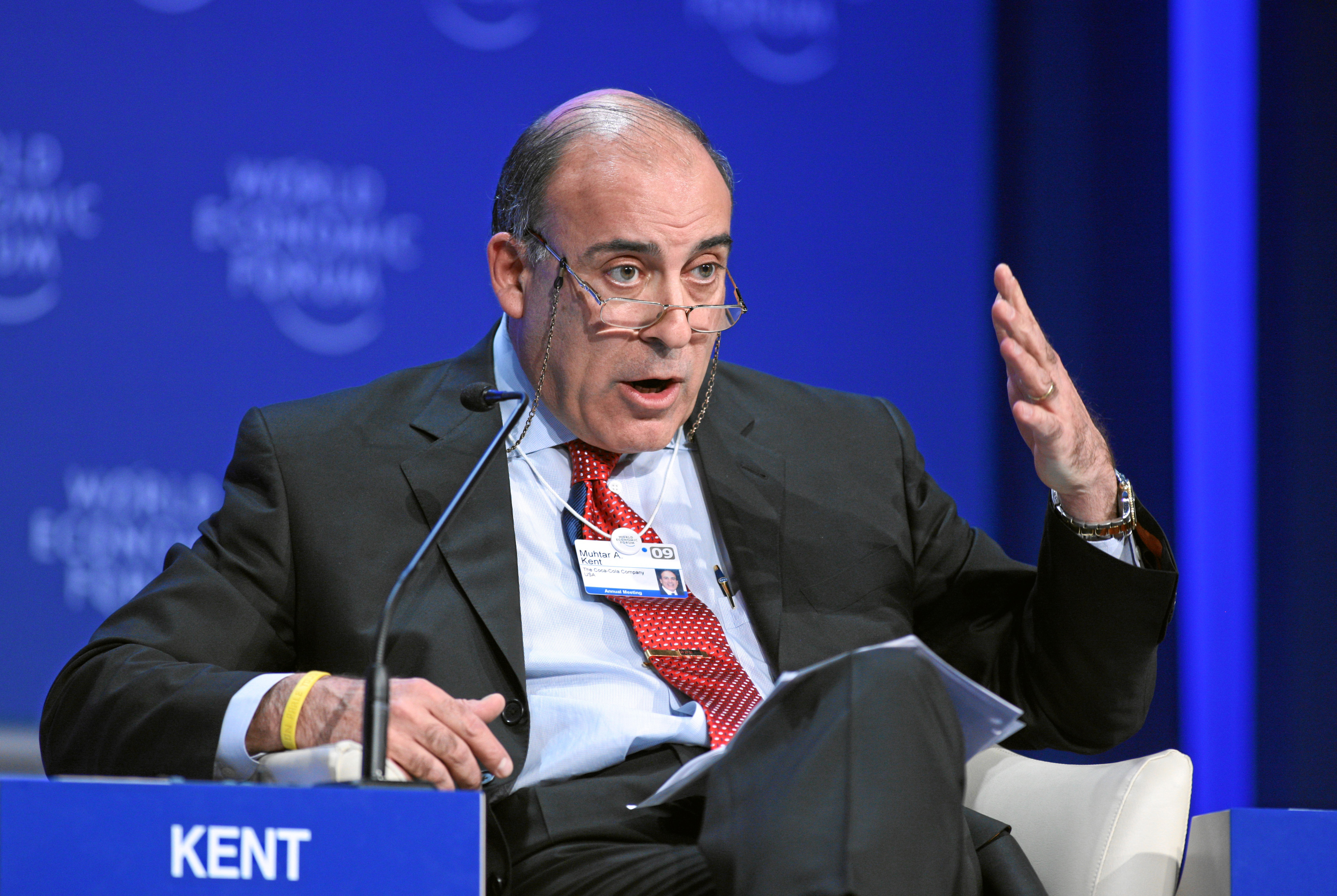
Muhtar Kent

- Winston Set Aung – Politician, economist and management consultant, incumbent deputy governor of the Central Bank of Myanmar
- Brendan Barber – former general secretary of the Trades Union Congress
- Michael Boulos – Associate director of Callian Capital Group, and partner of Tiffany Trump
- William Castell – Former chairman of the Wellcome Trust and a director of General Electric and BP, former CEO of Amersham plc
- James J. Greco – Former CEO and president of Sbarro
- Sir Stelios Haji-Ioannou – Founder of easyGroup
- Tom Ilube – British entrepreneur and chair of the RFU
- Diana Jenkins – Founder of Neuro Drinks and philanthropist
- Bob Kelly – Former CEO of Bank of New York Mellon and CFO of Mellon Financial Corporation and Wachovia Corporation
- Muhtar Kent – Former CEO and chairman of The Coca-Cola Company
- William Lewis – Former CEO Dow Jones Publisher, The Wall Street Journal
- Ian Livingstone – chairman and co-owner, London & Regional Properties
- Dick Olver – Former chairman of BAE Systems, member of the board of directors at Reuters
- Syed Ali Raza – Former president and chairman of the National Bank of Pakistan
- Brian Wynter – Governor of the Bank of Jamaica
- Durmuş Yılmaz – Governor of the Central Bank of Turkey

==== Media and entertainment ====
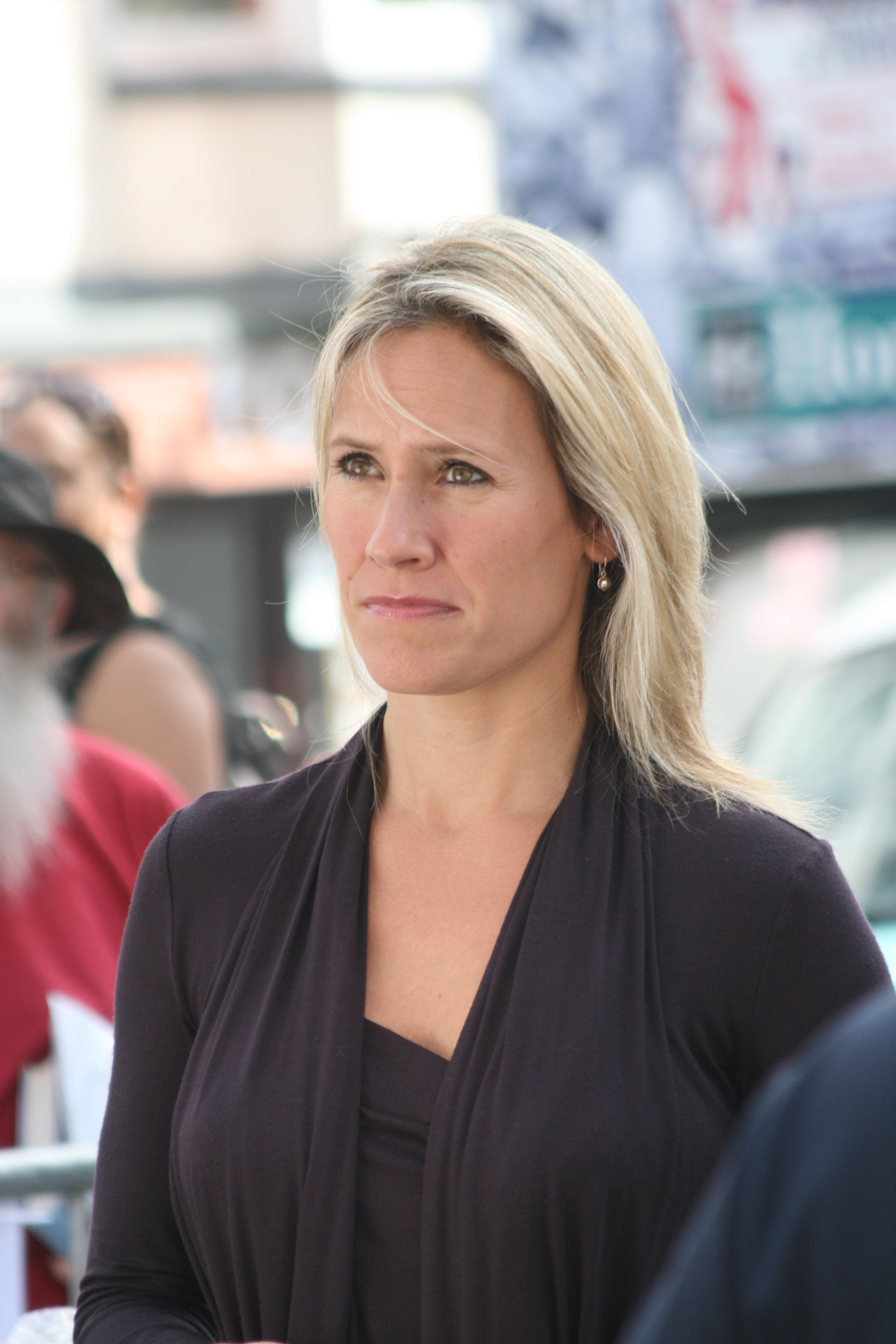
Sophie Raworth

- Samira Ahmed – Channel 4 News presenter, BBC News presenter, writer and journalist
- Decca Aitkenhead – Journalist
- Jomana Alrashid – CEO, Saudi Research and Media Group
- Emily Buchanan – BBC World Affairs correspondent
- Sally Bundock – BBC presenter
- Ellie Crisell – BBC presenter
- Joe Crowley - Journalist and presenter
- Imogen Edwards-Jones – Novelist
- Gamal Fahnbulleh – Sky News presenter and journalist
- Mimi Fawaz, BBC presenter and journalist
- Michael Fish – BBC weatherman
- Adam Fleming – CBBC reporter
- Lourdes Garcia-Navarro – Journalist, Jerusalem foreign correspondent for National Public Radio (NPR)
- Alex Graham – chairman of PACT and the Scott Trust
- Michael Grothaus – Novelist and journalist; author of Epiphany Jones
- Miles Harrison - Sports commentator
- Rachel Horne – BBC and Virgin Radio presenter and journalist
- Faisal Islam – BBC News economics editor
- Gillian Joseph – Sky News presenter
- Kirsty Lang – BBC presenter and journalist
- Ellie Levenson – Freelance journalist and author
- William Lewis – Journalist and editor of The Daily Telegraph
- Donal MacIntyre – Investigative journalist
- Sharon Mascall – Journalist, broadcaster and writer; lecturer at the University of South Australia
- Lucrezia Millarini – Freelance journalist and ITV newsreader
- Dermot Murnaghan – Presenter on Sky News
- Tiff Needell – Grand Prix driver, presenter of Fifth Gear on Five
- Maryam Nemazee – presenter for Al Jazeera London
- Linda Papadopoulos – psychologist, appearing occasionally on TV
- Lilah Parsons - freelance broadcast journalist for BBC News
- Sebastian Payne – Journalist
- Catherine Pepinster – journalist, religion writer
- Raj Persaud – British consultant psychiatrist, broadcaster, and author on psychiatry
- Gavin Ramjaun – Television presenter and journalist
- Sophie Raworth – Newsreader, presenter on BBC One O'Clock News
- Apsara Reddy – Journalist
- Joel Rubin – World-renowned klezmer clarinetist
- Ian Saville – British magician
- Barbara Serra – Presenter for Al Jazeera London
- Josh Widdicombe – Comedian and presenter

=== Notable academics and other staff ===
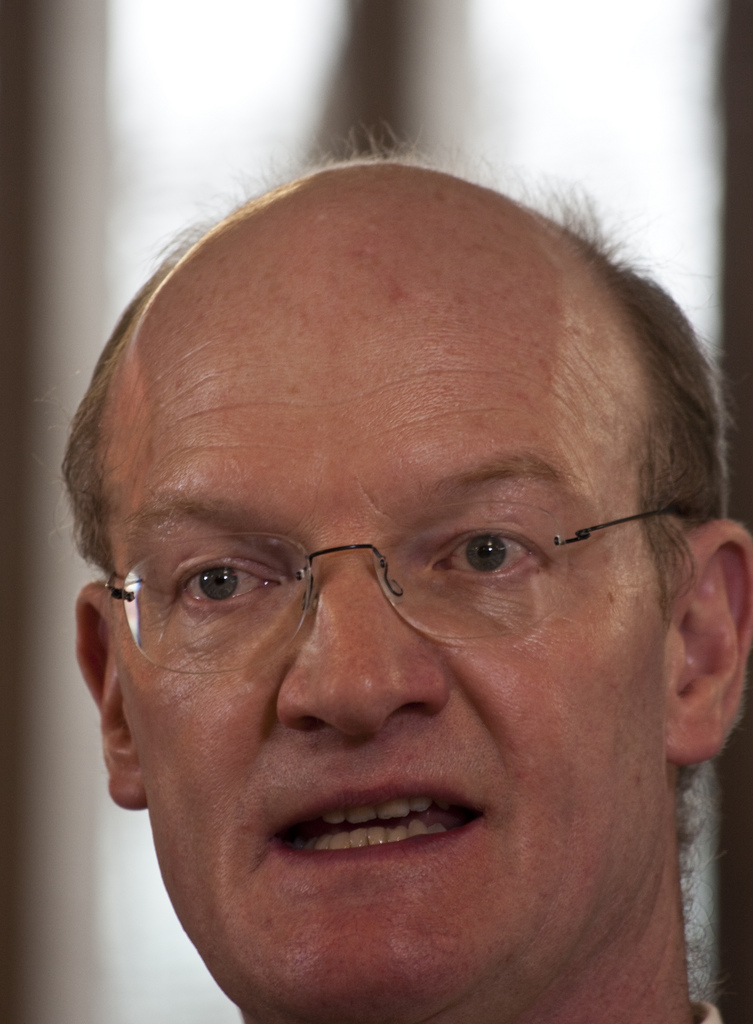
David Willetts

- Rosemary Crompton – Professor of Sociology
- Roy Greenslade – (until 2021) Journalist
- Steven Haberman – Professor of Actuarial Science at City St George's, University of London
- Corinna Hawkes – Professor of Food Policy
- Rosemary Hollis – Professor of International Politics at City St George's, University of London
- Jamal Nazrul Islam – Physicist, Mathematician, Cosmologist, Astronomer
- Ernest Krausz (1931–2018) - Israeli professor of sociology and President at Bar Ilan University
- David Leigh – Journalist
- David Marks – Psychologist
- Robin Milner – Computer scientist and recipient of the 1991 ACM Turing Award
- Ian Pace – Pianist
- Stewart Purvis – Broadcaster
- Denis Smalley – Composer

=== Vice-chancellors (pre-2016) and presidents (post-2016) ===
- 1966–1974: Sir James Sharp Tait
- 1974–1978: Sir Edward W. Parkes
- 1978–1998: Raoul Franklin
- 1998–2007: David William Rhind
- 2007–2009: Malcolm Gillies
- 2009–2010: Julius Weinberg (acting)
- 2010–2021: Sir Paul Curran
- 2021–Present: Sir Anthony Finkelstein

== In popular culture ==
City St George's Bastwick Street Halls of Residence in Islington was the first home of MasterChef following its 2005 revival.

== See also ==
- List of universities in the United Kingdom
- St George's, University of London
- Armorial of UK universities
- Education in the United Kingdom
- College of advanced technology (United Kingdom)
