= Ellie Levenson =

British journalist and author

Ellie Levenson (born July 1978) is a freelance journalist and author in the United Kingdom. She has written for The Guardian and New Statesman among others and is an occasional columnist for The Independent, writing opinion pieces and topical features on social policy and cultural theory. She also lectures part-time in journalism at Goldsmiths College, University of London, and on the London Programme of Syracuse University.

== Early life and education ==
Levenson was born in east London and raised in Walthamstow. She is Jewish. She studied for her undergraduate degree in English Language and Literature at Manchester University until 1999, where she wrote for the student paper, followed by a postgraduate diploma in journalism at City University in 2001. She was previously a stand-up comedian.

== Work ==
She was a reporter at The Lawyer for four months in 2002, then became a travel writer for The Guardian for four months after winning the Netjetter competition. She upset some in New Zealand by calling the country "essentially the dullest place on earth."

On her return to the UK she became editor of Fabian Review for the Fabian Society, where she also edited Fabian Thinkers: 120 years of progressive thought. She is an elected member of the Fabian Society executive.

She joined the charity End Child Poverty as their press and communications officer in May 2004, and has worked as a freelance journalist and lecturer since January 2005. She has campaigned for greater availability of the morning-after pill.

== Writing ==
Her book on feminism, The Noughtie Girl's Guide to Feminism was published by Oneworld Publications in July 2009. Sarah Vine of The Times described her as "a good example of the younger breed of feminists, women who are not exactly on the front line but who still make a contribution to the debate." Mary Fitzgerald of Prospect magazine argued that "whether or not you think the argument is dumbed-down feminism-lite (as I did in places), this book remains important." Molly Guinness writing in The Spectator complained that "the book is aimed at people that haven't thought about feminism; but Levenson makes no attempt to create well-informed feminists with a good sense of perspective.". Her second book, 50 Campaigns to Shout About was published by Oneworld Publications in May 2011.

In June 2015 her journalism textbook, Creativity and Feature Writing: How to get hundreds of new ideas every day was published by Routledge.

Levenson is the founder and owner of Fisherton Press, an independent children's book publisher that publishes picture books for young children, Fisherton Press publishes books by Levenson and by other writers. She writes for children under the name Eleanor Levenson and has also written a book for pre school children, What I Think About When I Think About ... Swimming published by Troika Books in May 2014 and illustrated by Katie O'Hagan.

She has appeared on the Moral Maze and Woman's Hour on Radio 4.

== Personal life ==
She lives in London and is married with three children.
