= Council of Legal Education =

The Council of Legal Education (CLE) was an English supervisory body established by the four Inns of Court to regulate and improve the legal education of barristers within England and Wales.

== History ==
The council was established in 1852 by the Inns of Court and originally consisted of eight members led by Richard Bethell, with two members coming from each Inn. The Council supervised the education of students at the Inns of Court, and initially established five professorships. Professors would lecture students at the Inns, who were required to attend a certain number of lectures to be called to the Bar. In 1872 membership of the council was expanded to twenty and mandatory examinations for the call to the Bar were introduced. The creation of the Senate of the Inns of Court and the Bar in 1967 pushed the Council into being a subdivision of that Senate rather than an independent organisation, and representatives of the Bar Council were added to the CLE. In 1997 the Council ceased to exist, transferring its assets to the Inns of Court School of Law, its educational and training functions to the Inns of Court and Bar Educational Trust and its regulatory functions to the General Council of the Bar.
