= Library of the Royal Institute of Asturian Studies =

Library in Spain

- Real Instituto De Estudios Asturianos RIDEA
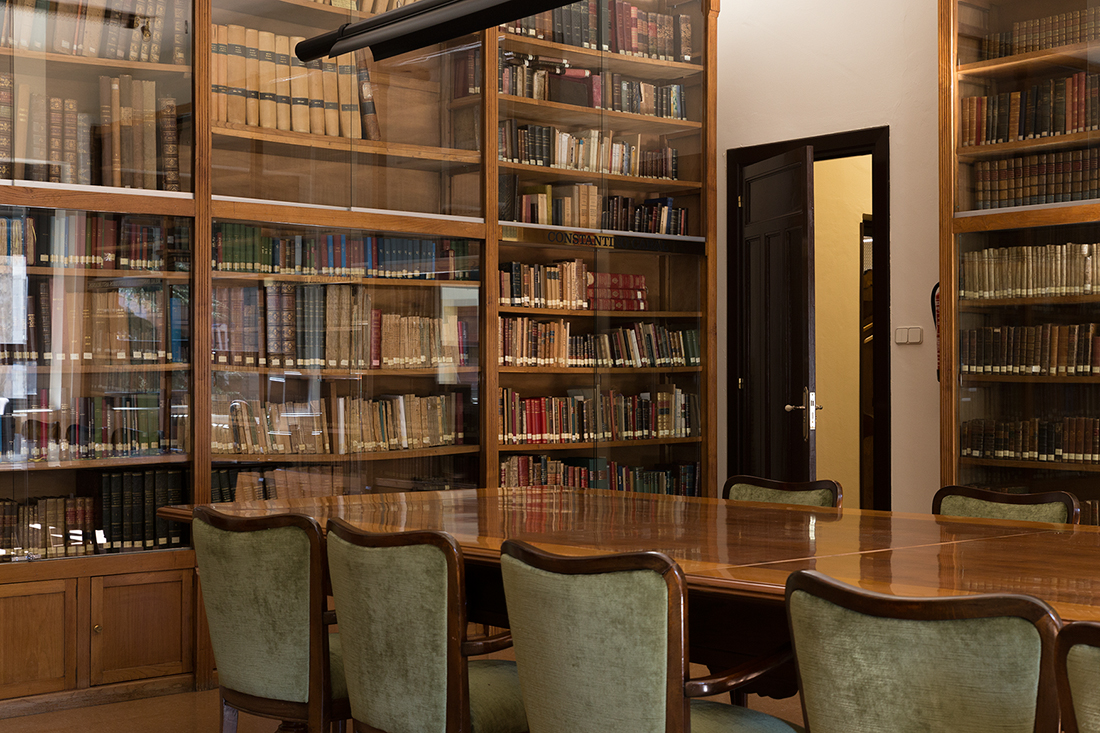
- Library of the Royal Institute of Asturian Studies
- 43.3623385819537°N 5.845106673550473°W
- Location: Asturias, Spain
- Established: 1946

Other information
- Website: www.ridea.org

The Library of the Royal Institute of Asturian Studies (Biblioteca del Real Instituto de Estudios Asturianos; BARIDEA) is a public entity containing the bibliographic heritage and documentation of Asturias. It was formally founded in the summer of 1946 at 3 Calle San Vicente in Oviedo, but moved to its present location in the Palacio Conde de Toreno on the Plaza de Porlier in 1957. It specialises in bibliographic documents and documentaries on Asturias and is one of the centres of study for the Royal Institute of Asturian Studies (RIDEA). It has a collection of about 20,000 volumes.

== Gallery ==
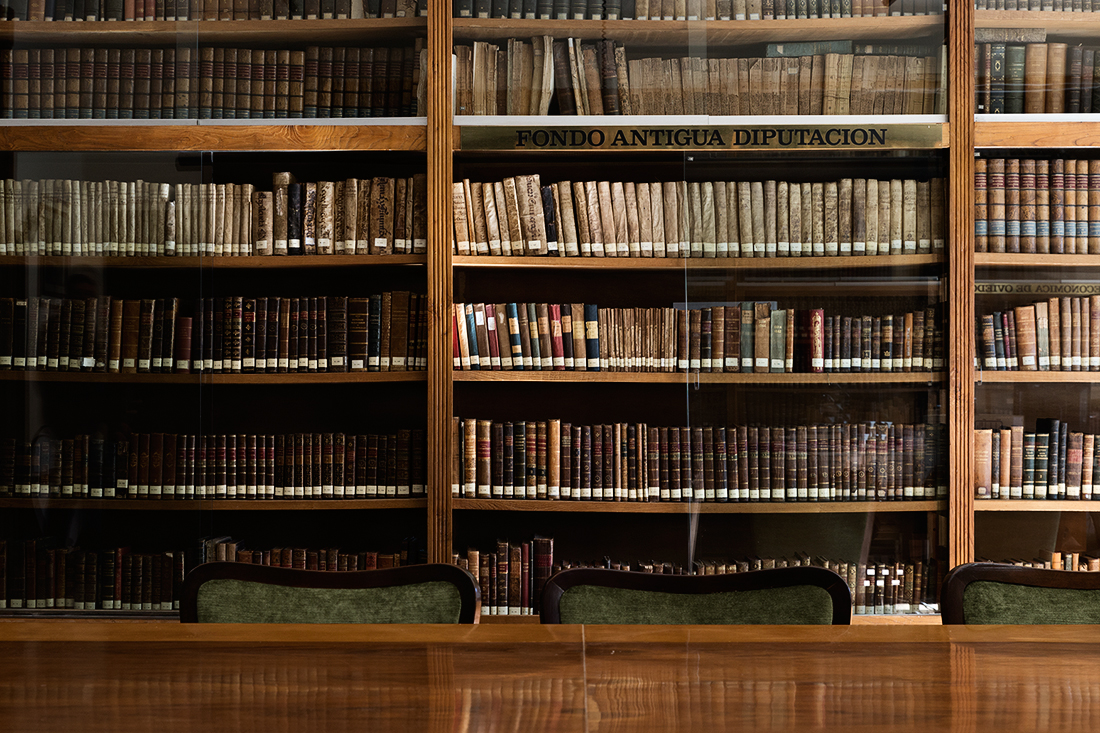

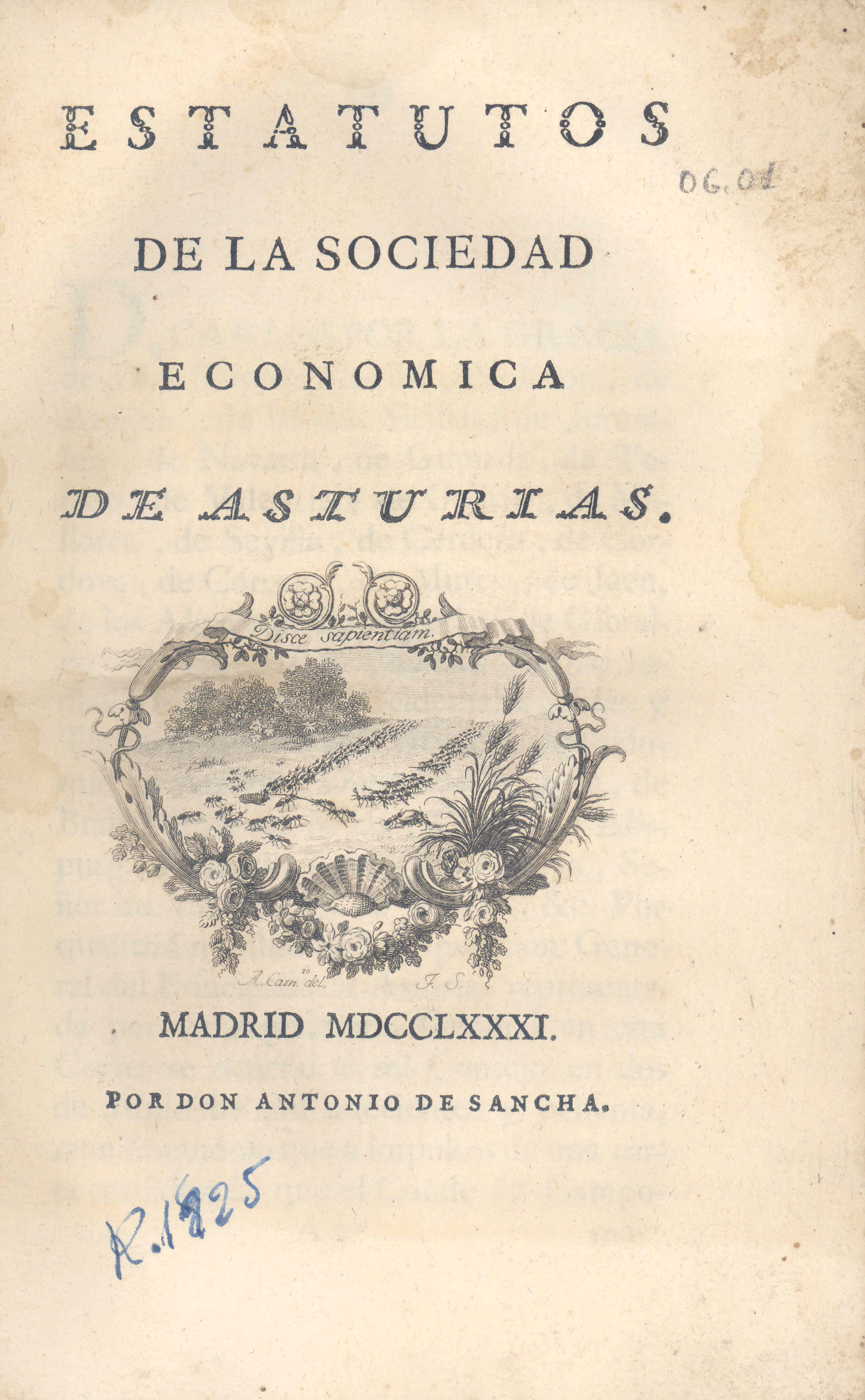

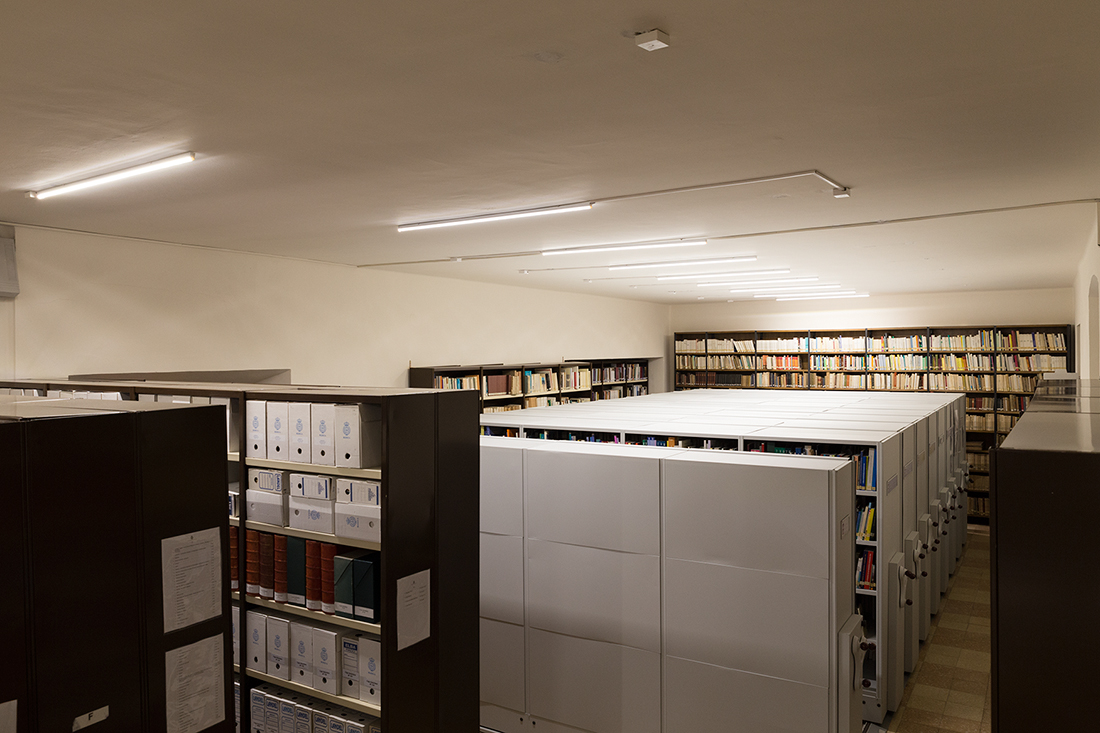

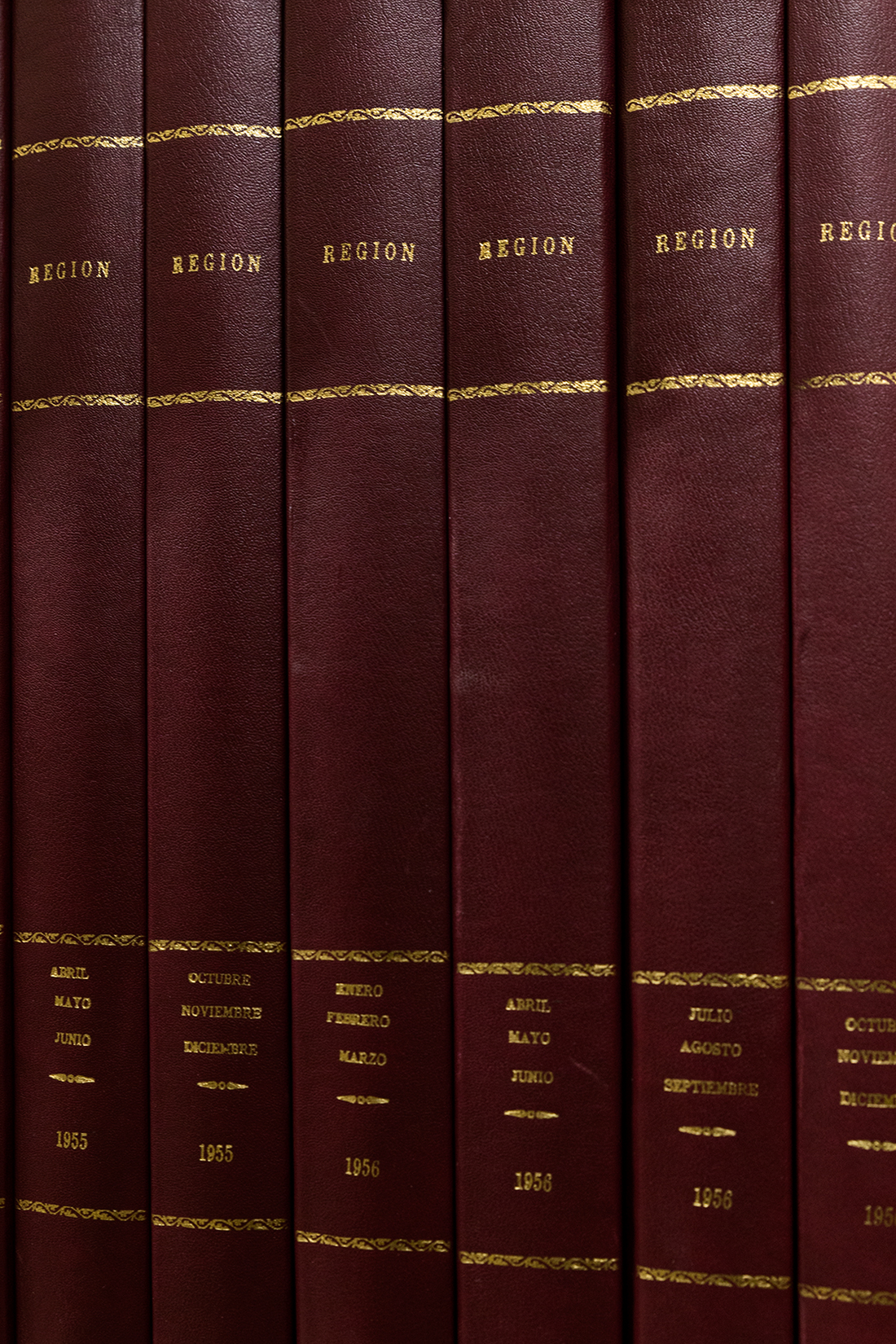

== Bibliography ==
- Toyos, Ana Belén de los, Catálogo de libros de fondo asturiano, Oviedo, RIDEA, 1996 (in Spanish)
- Castaño Rodríguez, María José, Catálogo de libros del fondo antiguo, Oviedo, RIDEA, 1996 (in Spanish)
- Fondo fotográfico del IDEA: 40 años de cultura asturiana (2), 1946–1986, Oviedo, RIDEA, 1989 (in Spanish)
