= Maryam Nemazee =

Iranian British broadcast journalist

- Born: London, England
- Education: Durham University; City, University of London
- Occupations: Journalist, news presenter

Maryam Nemazee (Persian: مریم نمازی) is a British-Iranian broadcast journalist, until recently working with Al Jazeera English. She was born in London to Iranian parents.

== Career ==
=== Al Jazeera English - London ===
At Al Jazeera English, Nemazee is based at the European broadcast-centre, in London which is now closed, and all news programs are in Doha. There she is a presenter on the flagship-programme Newshour. Previously she worked at the main broadcast-centre in Doha.

She has interviewed some of the world's top political and business leaders, including the former chairman of the Federal Reserve Paul Volcker, OPEC Secretary-General Abdallah Salem el-Badri, and IMF Managing Director Christine Lagarde.

=== Bloomberg ===
Previously, Nemazee was a London-based anchor with Bloomberg Television, presenting on all the main programmes and conducting exclusive interviews and real-time analysis of breaking-news affecting the global markets. She covered major events from the field, including the World Economic Forum in Davos, as well as the MENASA and COMESA events, and focused on trade and investment in the Middle East and Africa.

Nemazee was also on assignment for the election of the first socialist President in France for nearly two decades, anchoring and reporting from Paris. That same year, she was in New York reporting on the US elections, in London, covering the LIBOR scandal, and fronting a programme from the Middle East on Islamic finance.

=== Al Jazeera English - Doha ===
Before that, Nemazee spent four and a half years in the Middle East, at the main broadcast-centre of Al Jazeera English, in Doha. During this time, she covered stories such as the Israel-Palestinian conflict and Iran's nuclear negotiations. As well as working in the company's global headquarters in Qatar, she also had assignments at the broadcast-centres in the United States and in Asia.

=== Russia Today - Moscow ===
Nemazee was one of the presenters at the launch of Russia Today RT in Moscow in 2005.

== Personal life ==
Nemazee graduated from Durham University in England, where she studied History and Politics. She then obtained her professional broadcast journalism training, like many British broadcasters, at London's City University.

She is fluent in Persian.
