= Corinna Hawkes =

- Education: Bristol University; King's College London
- Scientific career
- Workplaces: Food and Agriculture Organization of the United Nations; City, University of London; World Cancer Research Fund International
- Thesis: Mediterranean shrub mortality : a field and modelling investigation (1998)
- Website: www.linkedin.com/in/corinna-hawkes-79b6ba130/

Corinna Hawkes is a specialist in food systems. She is Director, Division of Food Systems and Food Safety for the Food and Agriculture Organization of the United Nations (FAO). Between 2016 and 2023 she was Director, Centre for Food Policy at City, University of London. She is also co-founder of the Next Gen(D)eration Leadership Collective.

== Early life and education ==
Hawkes was born in York, England. She studied geography at the University of Bristol. She moved to King's College London as a postgraduate researcher and earned her PhD in 1998. Her PhD focused on ecology and food systems.

== Research and career ==
After her PhD Hawkes spent four months in Los Angeles, where she discovered farmers' markets and the American food movement, showing it was possible to pursue her passion for food as a career. She returned to the United Kingdom and volunteered for the organisation Sustain: the alliance for better food and farming. She began to research food poverty which started her career in food policy. She moved to the US in 1999 where she worked as a volunteer in community food system projects in Boston and New York City, taught at New York University and worked as a consultant on international projects for UN agencies.

In 2004 Hawkes joined the International Food Policy Research Institute. In 2008, Hawkes was appointed chair of the World Health Organisation expert group on the marketing of food and non-alcoholic drinks to children. In 2009-2010 she lived in Brazil where she served as a Fellow in the School of Public Health at the University of São Paulo.

In 2012 Hawkes moved to the World Cancer Research Fund International, where she served as Head of Policy and Public Affairs. She established the NOURISHING policy framework of policies that promotes and tracks healthy diets. Between 2015 and 2018 she co-led the annual Global Nutrition Report, identifying places for progress. The report includes global targets for nutrition as defined by the Sustainable Development Goals.

In 2016 Hawkes was appointed Chair of the World Economic Forum Global Future Council on Agriculture. She co-led the writing of the report Food Systems and Diets: Facing the Challenges of the 21st Century. She was appointed to the London Food Board in 2017 and in 2018 the Mayor of London appointed Hawkes as the Vice Chair, London's Child Obesity Taskforce.

She was a member of The Lancet commission on obesity and a member of the EAT-Lancet Commission on Healthy Diets from Sustainable Food Systems Forum.

Other honorary positions have included Distinguished Fellow at The George Institute for Global Health and chair of the Board of Bite Back 2030.

She has written hundreds of articles, reports and blogs, including for The Conversation. and at her own blog www.thebetterfoodjourney.com. Hawkes argues that policy and practice in food systems should be informed by people's lived experience of their own food system and the other systems in which we live our lives.

== Personal life ==
She is married to the urbanist writer and educator Andy Merrifield. They have a daughter together, named Lili-Rose Merrifield, born in 2007, in the French city of Issoire.

She is also the granddaughter of the pioneering English archeologist Jacquetta Hawkes.
