= Natpudan Apsara =

- Genre: Talk show
- Presented by: Apsara
- Country of origin: India
- Original language: Tamil
- No. of seasons: 1
- No. of episodes: 26

Production
- Camera setup: Multi-camera
- Running time: approx. 40-45 minutes per episode

Original release
- Network: Thanthi TV
- Release: 13 July 2013 – 1 January 2014

Natpudan Apsara (Tamil: நட்புடன் அப்சரா; is a 2013 Indian Tamil-language talk show that aired every Saturday on Thanthi TV from 13 July 2013 to 1 January 2014, for 26 episodes. The show is hosted by Apsara 2356, This is the Second TV show in India hosted by a transgender person.

== Guests included ==
- Epi 01: Dhanush & Amala Paul
- Epi 02: Anirudh Ravichander & Namitha
- Epi 03: Silambarasan & Priya Anand
- Epi 04: Vijay Sethupathi & Varalaxmi Sarathkumar
- Epi 05: Sivakarthikeyan & Ramya Krishnan
- Epi 06: Selvaraghavan & Gitanjali
- Epi 07: Simran & Taapsee Pannu
- Epi 08: Yuvan Shankar Raja & Aishwarya R. Dhanush
- Epi 09: Chinni Jayanth & Lakshmy Ramakrishnan
- Epi 10: Vijay Antony & Sunitha Sarathy
