= María López-Fanjul y Díez del Corral =

Spanish art historian

- Born: 1970 (age 55–56); Madrid, Spain
- Education: Complutense University of Madrid; University of Florence; City St George's, University of London; Courtauld Institute of Art
- Occupations: art historian Curator

María López-Fanjul y Díez del Corral (Madrid, 1970) is a Spanish art historian. Since December 2025, she has held the position of director of the Museum of Fine Arts of Asturias.

== Education ==
López-Fanjul y Díez del Corral studied art history at the Complutense University of Madrid and the University of Florence between 1997 and 2002. In 2002, she enrolled at City St George's, University of London, where she obtained a master's degree in Museum and Gallery Management. She continued her studies in Madrid, receiving a Diploma of Advanced Studies in Art History in 2005. Between 2007 and 2011, she pursued her Doctor of Philosophy at the Courtauld Institute of Art.

== Career ==
Her first museum experience took place in 2001 while she was a student at the Museo Nacional Centro de Arte Reina Sofía in Madrid. During her initial period of study abroad in London (2002–2003), she worked in the Middle East section of the Asian Department at the Victoria and Albert Museum.

In 2012, she moved to Germany to work at the Staatliche Museen zu Berlin; She initially worked at the central administration and the Gemäldegalerie (Picture Gallery); from 2017, she served as a curator at the Bode Museum, which houses the sculpture collection and the Museum of Byzantine art and is located on Museum Island. There, she was responsible for the departments of Italian art (post-1500) and Spanish art, as well as research activities.

Alongside other projects, López-Fanjul has curated and organized exhibitions such as The Golden Age: The Era of Velázquez (Gemäldegalerie, 2016; Kunsthalle Munich, 2017) and the A Different Perspective series (Bode Museum, 2019 and 2021), as well as Frank Dialogue: On the History of the Bode Museum (Bode Museum, 2020), Spanish Dialogues: Picasso from the Museum Berggruen at the Bode Museum (Bode Museum, 2023), and The Healing Museum (Bode Museum, 2025).

She has served as the director of the Museum of Fine Arts of Asturias since December 2025. In 2026, she was appointed vice-chair of the "Transfer Advisory Board" at Heidelberg University; An advisory body composed of six international experts, in which López-Fanjul represents the field of the Humanities.

== Publications (selection) ==
- Spaniens goldene Zeit. Die Ära Velázquez in Malerei und Skulptur. Hirmer, Munich 2016, ISBN 978-3-7774-2478-1. Editora.
- Der zweite Blick. Spielarten der Liebe. arthistoricum.net/Universitätsbibliothek Heidelberg, Heidelberg 2020, versión digitalizada. Editora.
  - edición en inglés: The second glance. All Forms of Love. arthistoricum.net/Universitätsbibliothek Heidelberg, Heidelberg 2020, versión digitalizada.
- Der zweite Blick. Frauen. arthistoricum.net/Universitätsbibliothek Heidelberg, Heidelberg 2021, ISBN 978-3-98501-057-8, versión digitalizada. Editora.
  - edición en inglés: The second glance. Women. arthistoricum.net/Universitätsbibliothek Heidelberg, Heidelberg 2021, ISBN 978-3-98501-059-2, versión digitalizada.
- How art works. Von Fragen und Antworten. Deutscher Kunstverlag, Berlin 2022, ISBN 978-3-422-98297-0. Editora junto a Christine Seidel.
  - edición en inglés: How art works. Of questions and answers. Deutscher Kunstverlag, Berlin 2022, ISBN 978-3-422-98303-8.
- Neue kuratorische Strategien für alte Kunstsammlungen: Kunstwissenschaftliche Forschung als Basis für Outreach (= Themenheft Kritische Berichte 50, 4). 2022. Editora junto a Andreas Huth.
