= Apsara Reddy =

Indian politician and journalist

Personal details
- Born: Madras
- Party: All India Anna Dravida Munnetra Kazhagam (from April 2020)
- Other political affiliations: Indian National Congress (September 2018 to April 2020)
- Occupation: Senior Journalist/Politician/Social Activist

Official Spokesperson (National TV), AIADMK (Current) National General Secretary of All India Mahila Congress (2018-2020)

Apsara Reddy (born Ajay Reddy) is an Indian trans woman politician and journalist. She was earlier inducted as National Spokesperson of All India Anna Dravida Munnetra Kazhagam (AIADMK) by former Chief Minister J. Jayalalithaa in 2016. On 8 January 2018, Reddy became the first transgender person to hold office in the Congress. She returned to the AIADMK and campaigned as its star campaigner in the 2021 State elections.

== Early life and education ==
Reddy has a BA degree in Journalism from Monash University and an MA in Broadcasting with a special focus on Developmental Economics from the City University in London. She was the Overseas Students Service's President at Monash University.

== Career ==
Reddy has worked with the BBC World Service, The Hindu, Commonwealth Secretariat in London, New Indian Express and Deccan Chronicle. She has written columns on topics including consumerism, politics, celebrity lifestyles and education. She has interviewed Amitabh Bachchan, Aishwarya Rai, Ex PM Australia John Howard, F1 racer Michael Schumacher, AR Rahman, and Hollywood star Nicolas Cage. She has also covered the tsunami from Sri Lanka, India and Indonesia.

She has also worked at the Indian Consulate in Melbourne as a media adviser to the Consulate General, Dr. T.J. Rao.

Reddy also worked briefly with UNICEF to launch a health campaign across Tamil Nadu.

Starting in 2013, she hosted a Tamil show Natpudan Apsara which aired on Thanthi TV.

She has also spoken at various high-profile platforms including the European Parliament Session in Madrid, The World Pride Summit, UNICEF and top institutions like Goldman Sachs, NASSCOM INDIA and even at Princeton University.

=== Politics ===
In May 2016, she joined the All India Anna Dravida Munnetra Kazhagam(AIADMK). Previously, she had joined Bharatiya Janata Party in February 2016. In January 2019, she was appointed national general secretary of All India Mahila Congress by Rahul Gandhi, making her the first transgender person to be appointed as a general secretary of any political party in India. In November 2020, she rejoined AIADMK ahead of the upcoming Tamil Nadu assembly election.
