= Robert Mullineux Walmsley =

British electrical pioneer

Dr Robert Mullineux Walmsley FRSE (1854–1924) was a British electrical pioneer. He was one of the first to bridge the gap between academic theory and practical use of electricity in the working world.

== Life ==
He was born near Liverpool in 1854, the eldest of nine children. He studied Sciences at the University of London graduating BSc in 1882. He began teaching physics in London then took on a post as assistant Demonstrator to Prof Ayrton at Finsbury Technical College. He then worked under Prof Silvanus Thompson, receiving a doctorate (DSc) in 1886.

In 1890 he went to Edinburgh as Professor of Electrical Engineering at Heriot-Watt University.

In 1891 he was elected a Fellow of the Royal Society of Edinburgh. His proposers were Francis Grant Ogilvie, William Henry Perkin, Alexander Bruce, and Sir Byrom Bramwell.

In 1895 he was living at 5 Seton Place in the Grange district in south Edinburgh.

In 1896 he relocated from Edinburgh to Northampton Polytechnic Institute in Clerkenwell as its very first principal. The college later evolved into City, University of London.

He was struck by a vehicle on a London street near his home in Islington on 12 June 1924 and never regained consciousness. He died in London on 14 June 1924.

== Family ==
In 1896 he married Emily Victoria Hicks.

== Publications ==
- Electric Current: How Produced and How Used (1894)
- Transatlantic Engineering Schools and Engineering (1904)
- Engineering Colleges and the War (1915)
- Electricity in the Service of Man (1921)
- Modern Practical Electricity
