= Barbara Mensah =

British judge of Ghanaian descent

- Born: Ghana
- Education: University of Wales; City University London; Queen Mary University London
- Occupation: Judge

Barbara Mensah is a British judge of Ghanaian descent. She became the first circuit judge of African origin in England and Wales when she was appointed to the South Eastern Circuit in 2005. As of October 2016, she sits in Luton Crown Court, England.

== Early life ==
Mensah was born in Ghana, West Africa, the daughter of a business magnate. She lived in Ghana until she was six years old, when she moved to the United Kingdom. She was the first university graduate from her family.

== Education ==
Mensah attended Millfield School and subsequently studied Philosophy at the University of Wales in Swansea before training to be a barrister. She is also an alumna of City University London and Queen Mary University London. In 2009, she was named Old Millfieldian of the Year in recognition of her achievement in being appointed as the first circuit judge of African origin.

== Career ==
Mensah was called to the Bar at Lincoln's Inn in 1984. Early on in her career, she took up private-sector work, and then moved on to sit on a Financial Services Tribunal. She became interested in further judicial work. She was appointed a recorder in 2003. She was appointed as a circuit judge on the South Eastern Circuit in 2005 and is currently (2016) a circuit judge at the Luton Crown Court, the first woman of African descent to attain that position. In 2015, she was awarded an honorary degree of juris doctor by City, University of London, in acknowledgement of her contribution to the law profession. On 5 November 2026 the Judicial Conduct Investigations Office published a formal warning for judicial misconduct

== Publications ==
- Barbara, Mensah (2012). European Human Rights Case Summaries. Routledge. p. 1220. ISBN 978-1135339302.
