= Jerry Fishenden =

British writer

Jerry Fishenden is a British technologist. Fishenden has been referred to as "one of the UK’s leading authorities in the world of technology", and appears regularly in a variety of mainstream media.

== Education ==
In 1984 he graduated with a BSc (Hons) from the City University, London, where he also later obtained an MPhil In 2013, he was awarded a PhD in creative technologies from De Montfort University's Institute of Creative Technologies.

== Career ==
He was appointed as the specialist adviser to the House of Commons Science and Technology Committee for their inquiry into Digital Government (2018-2019) and is a member of the Scottish Government's Online Identity Assurance Expert Group. He was a cofounder and director of the former Centre for Technology Policy Research, and formerly a senior research fellow in the Centre for Creative Computing at Bath Spa University, and a visiting senior fellow at the London School of Economics Department of Management as well as being a key advisor to the Policy Engagement Network. In November 2010 he was appointed as a specialist adviser to the House of Commons Public Administration Select Committee to assist the committee with their inquiry into government IT. From 2009 to 2010, he was appointed as a member of the Scottish Government's expert panel on identity management and privacy, and has been an invited speaker at the Cambridge Union Society. He was the co-chair of the U.K. Government's Privacy and Consumer Advisory Group from 2011 to 2017.

He has held a variety of the IT industry's most senior positions, including as the UK Government's interim deputy chief technology officer, Microsoft's lead technology policy and strategy advisor; as head of business systems for the UK's chief financial services regulator in the City of London; as an officer of the House of Commons, where he pioneered the Parliamentary data and video network at the Houses of Parliament, as well as putting Parliament on the World Wide Web; and as a director of IT in the National Health Service.

His blog tackles issues at the intersection of technology and policy. Analysts Redmonk have referred to him as being a 'trusted advisor'. His Scotsman article on the proposed Identity Card for the UK, which was the first public commentary on the system by a recognised industry figure, opened up constructive debate on an important topic.

He is a fellow with Chartered status of the British Computer Society (FBCS CITP), a fellow of the Royal Society of Arts (FRSA), a fellow of the Institute for the Management of Information Systems (FIMIS) and a fellow of the Institution of Analysts and Programmers. He is also a long-time member of the Writers Guild of Great Britain.
