= Umberto Pettinicchio =

Italian painter and sculptor (born 1943)

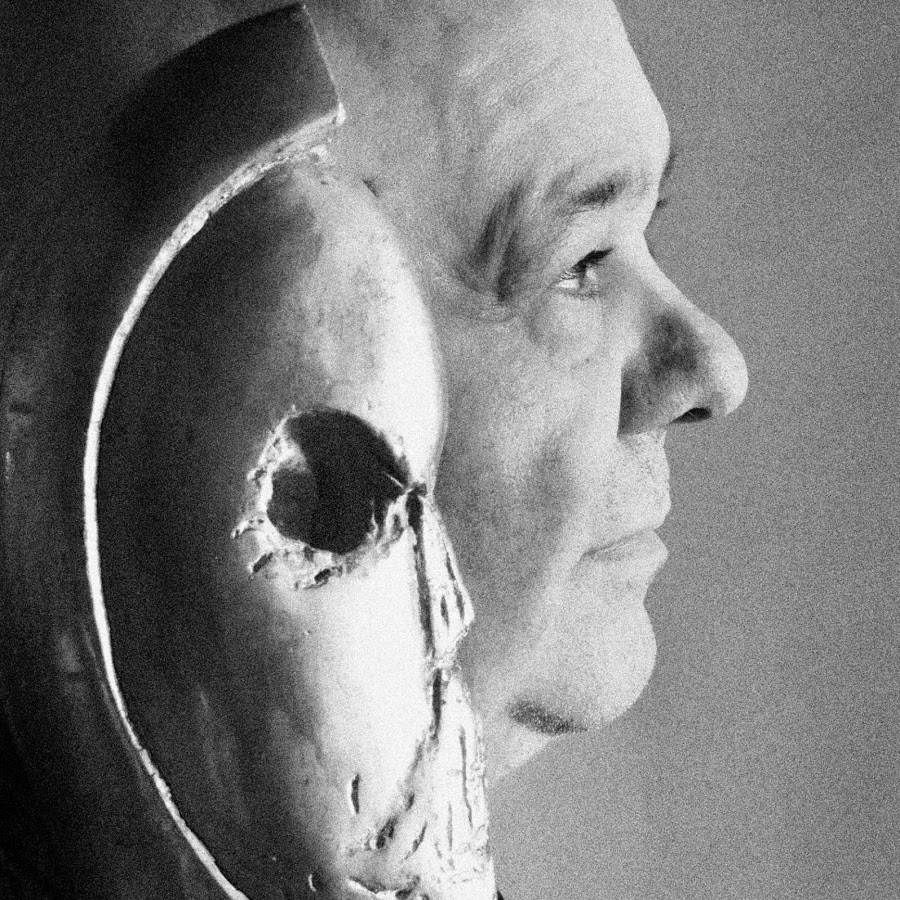
Umberto Pettinicchio

Umberto Pettinicchio (born 1943) is an Italian painter and sculptor.

== Biography ==
He was born in Torremaggiore and moved to Milan, where he studied at the Accademia di Belle Arti di Brera and had his first show in 1969. His early paintings were in the expressionist style but became increasingly more abstract. His 1981 painting The Death of the Bull is held in the Museo de Arte Moderno y Contemporáneo de Santander y Cantabria.

His first solo exhibitions, including at the Nuova Sfera, Milan, 1973 (curated by Carlo Munari), in 1977 at the Rome Triptych, in 1974 at Il Castello di Milano, in 1975 (edited by Raffaele De Grada). In 1976 Pettinicchio opened his Milan studio in via Bolzano, where he produced some of his important works with which he achieved international fame.

In the 1980s, he was always present at the most important exhibitions (at the Salotto di Como in 1980, at Il Castello di Milano in 1981, at Il Mercante di Milano in 1982), and was also enriched by important Spanish exhibitions (Sargadelos, Barcelona, 1982 , Piquio, Santander, 1982, at the VIII Madrid Biennial, 1983).

== Style ==
The artist Umberto Pettinicchio has often dealt with the human figure in his pictorial research, initially in an expressionist style. Subsequently, his pictorial style becomes more and more abstract until finally reaching the Informal. Only a vaguely perceptible appearance remains of the figure, while, from a formal point of view, everything is distorted in the artist's pictorial gestures. Pettinicchio's gesture breaks the dimensional planes and transforms the human figure into a shapeless matter marked by large black lines. The one carried out by Pettinicchio seems a kind of brutalist operation in the vein of a Jean Dubuffet, but while the French gave much more importance to the subject, our artist solves everything through pictorial writing.
