= Royal Institute of Asturian Studies =

Spanish cultural entity

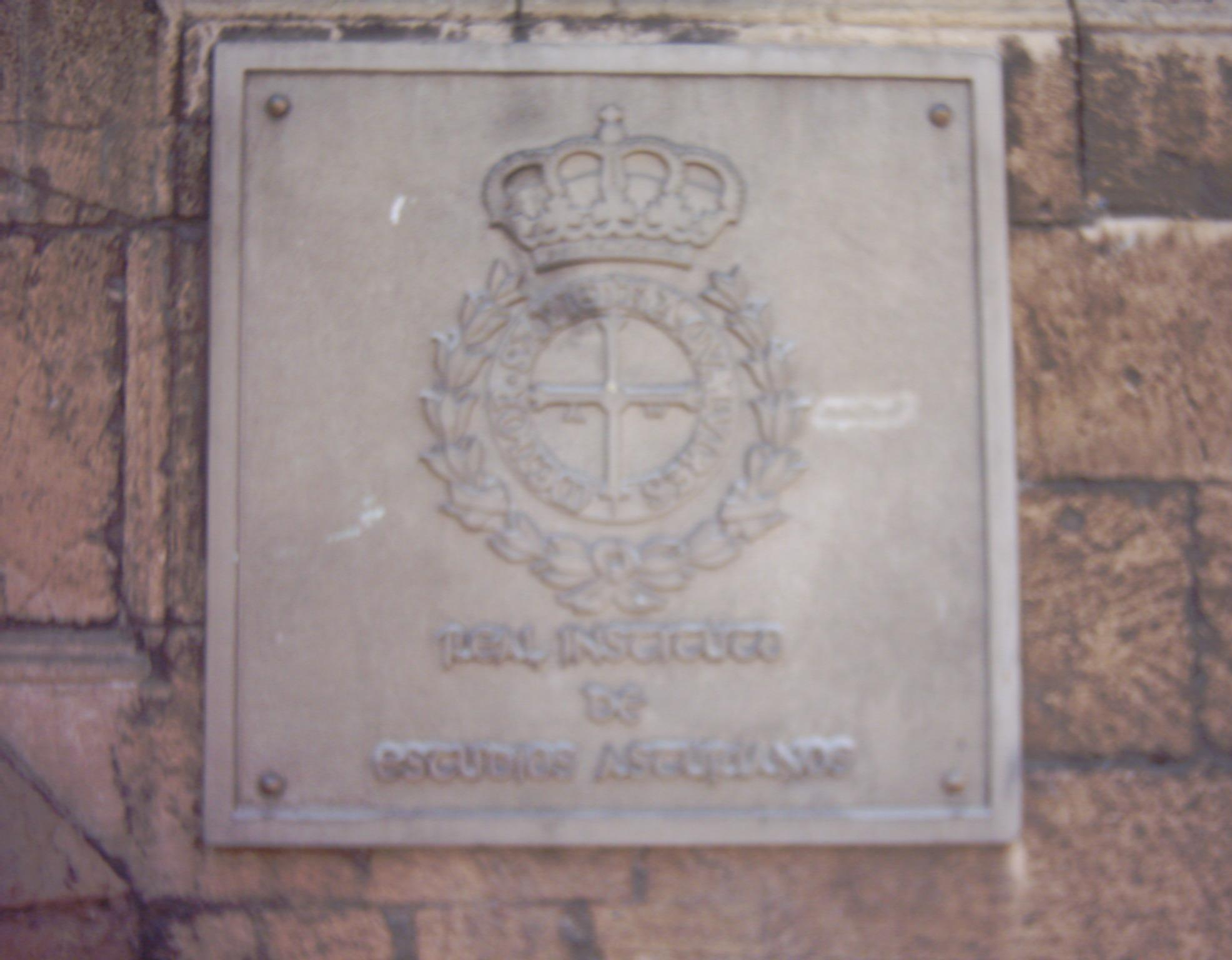
Plaque at the RIDEA building.

The Royal Institute of Asturian Studies (Asturian: Real Institutu d'Estudios Asturianos or RIDEA) is a public cultural institution of the autonomous community of Asturias. It aims include "research, development and direction of work and studies which tend to conserve, enhance and increase the science, culture and art in the Principality of Asturias in all its aspects and more specifically in Asturias". Established in 1945, it is a part of the Ministry of Education and Culture. It is headquartered in the Palacio de los Condes de Toreno in Oviedo's Porlier Square, and includes Tuscan columns. The Prince of Asturias, Felipe de Borbon y Grecia, is honorary chairman.

== See also ==
- Library of the Royal Institute of Asturian Studies
