= Northampton Square =

Square in the London Borough of Islington, England

Coordinates: 51.5273°N 0.1023°W

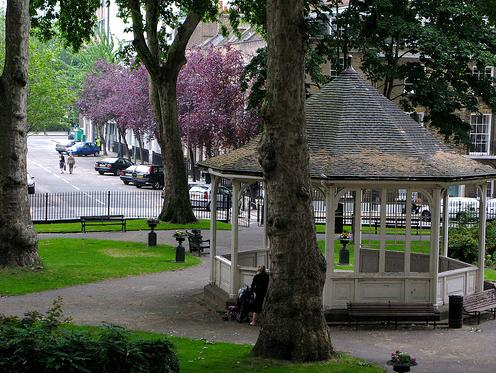
Northampton Square.

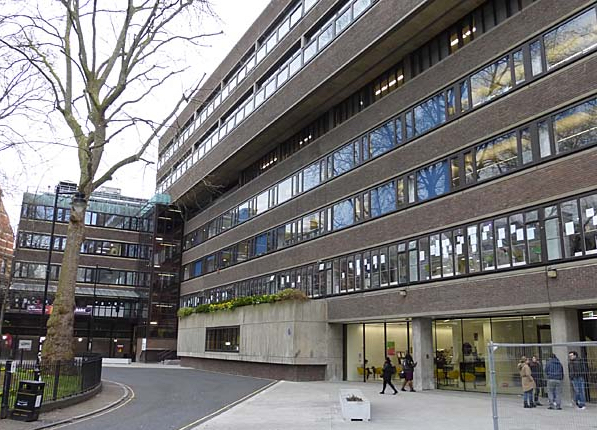
View of the main building of City, University of London, from Northampton Square.

Northampton Square, a green town square, is in a corner of Clerkenwell projecting into Finsbury, in Central London. It is between Goswell Road and St John Street (and Spencer and Percival Streets), has a very broad pedestrian walkway on the north-west side between university buildings and is fronted chiefly by the main buildings of City St George's, University of London.

== History ==
The area began to be developed in the industrial revolution. The land was laid out as a residential square in 1803-04 and the houses were built between 1805 and 1814. The square took its name from the local landowner, the Marquess of Northampton. The gardens were opened to the public in 1885, with funding from the Metropolitan Public Gardens Association. The Association's landscape gardener Fanny Wilkinson designed the gardens, and included a drinking fountain and bandstand, both of which remain, as does a circle of London planes. The fountain in the square commemorates the 1885 restoration of the gardens by Shropshire magistrate Charles Walker, who had been born in Clerkenwell. Lady Margaret Georgiana Graham, daughter of William Compton, 4th Marquess of Northampton, opened the restored gardens on 8 July 1885.

The square has historically housed clockmakers, jewellers, silversmiths and other fine crafts and more recently houses a fine eatery known locally as Cafe Fiori which is very popular with locals and students alike. The print-maker George Baxter lived and worked at No.11 from 1844 to 1860. The site is marked by a plaque on the modern building at that address. In 1878, Walter Thornbury reported that No.35 head-quartered the British Horological Institute, “for the cultivation of the science of horology, and its kindred arts and manufactures”. By the 1960s such trades had left the area and the buildings were a mixture of flats and offices.

No.18, on the corner of Ashby Street, replaced the Ashby Castle pub (from 1813 to 1882).

== City St. George's, University of London, in Northampton Square ==
In 1891, the Northampton Institute was founded, and its original building opened in the Square in 1896. In 2001, a fire gutted the Grade II listed College Building; it was fully restored, re-opening in July 2006. The Institute evolved to become City St. George's, University of London. The City University was created by Royal Charter in 1966 and housed in a major new campus, designed by Richard Sheppard Robson and Partners in 1962, and completed in 1976, dominating the north side of Northampton Square. City, University of London merged with St George’s, University of London on 1 August 2024 to become City St George’s, University of London. The 2008 film Incendiary starring Ewan McGregor was filmed partly at this location.

== Northampton Square bandstand ==
The bandstand in the centre was built by Finsbury Borough Council in 1930 as a public amenity. It is unusual in being a bandstand in a residential square rather than a large public park. In August 2008, Northampton Square bandstand was the inaugural venue for the musical entertainment Big Summer Busk. In 2010, it was a venue for the Bandstand Busking event. After a major refurbishment, the bandstand was reopened in 2011 by the Mayor of Islington and the Vice-Chancellor of the University.
