= Albert Vidalie =

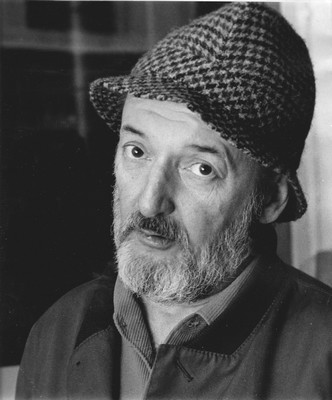
- Born: 4 August 1882; Châtillon, France
- Died: 27 April 1930 (aged 47); Paris, France
- Occupations: Novelist; Screenwriter; Songwriter

Albert Vidalie (25 May 1913 – 8 June 1971) was a French writer, screenwriter, and songwriter.

== Biography ==
Vidalie was the son of Jeanne Deshayes, a stitcher, born à La Ville-du-Bois in the Hurepoix and Jean-Baptiste Vidalie, a printing worker, born in Mauriac, Cantal. He married Madeleine Constantin in 1936, with whom he had three daughters, Colette (1937), Danièle (1946-1948) and Isabelle (1951).

From the age of 12, he made small trades until the 39/45 war during which he was held prisoner for five years in Neusalz on Oder in Silesia. After the war, the Radiodiffusion française sought memories and poems of prisoners. He introduced himself, and thanks to two poems in slang language, he became the assistant of a radio series and wrote scenarios and adaptations put on air.

He also worked as a journalist for the newspaper France Dimanche.

Between 1952 and 1968, he published nine novels and short stories.

He also attended the post-war Saint-Germain-des-Prés. His friends were Roger Nimier, Kléber Haedens, Paul Guimard, and Antoine Blondin, the godfather of his daughters. He was also close to Pierre Mac Orlan, Jean Giono, and Georges Arnaud.

He wrote cabaret shows played at the cabaret de la Rose Rouge, the Théâtre La Bruyère, at the Fontaine des 4 saisons, a cabaret directed by Pierre Prévert and wrote screenplays and dialogues for the cinema, adaptations or original texts.

He was a lyricist of songs; the best known was Les loups sont entrés dans Paris, created by Serge Reggiani in 1967.

At the end of his life he wrote two screenplays for television serials, the second of which, Mandrin, will not be released until after his death.

He lived in Châtillon during his first 23 years, then Fontenay-aux-Roses, then in the Luberon ar Reillanne near Manosque close to his friend Jean Giono. He finished his life in the 14th arrondissement of Paris.

Albert Vidalie was not born to frequent worldly bistros, but to live among men built by God, that is, frank or treacherous as those who are always ready to pay cash.

— Pierre Mac Orlan, preface to the Bijoutiers du clair de lune, Ed. Club de la femme, 1954

== Bibliography ==
=== Novels and collections of short stories ===
- 1952: C'était donc vrai
- 1954: The Night Heaven Fell - adapted to cinema under the éponymous title by Roger Vadim in 1958
- 1955: La Bonne Ferte, Éditions Denoël, Prix des libraires
- 1958: Chandeleur l'artiste
- 1959: La Belle Française
- 1960: Cadet la Rose
- 1961: Le Pont des Arts
- 1963: Les Verdures de l'Ouest
- 1968: Les Hussards de la Sorgue
- 2010: L'Aimable-Julie, Monsieur Charlot et Consorts - Le Dilettante

=== Theatre ===
- 1949: Saint Parapin d'Malakoff - Play by Albert Vidalie, directed by Philippe Clair, setting by Klementieff, Théâtre de l'Œuvre, with Jean Tielment, Denise Bailly, Charles Bensoussan, Chalosse, Jean Rocherot, Sylvie Pelayo, Brigitte Sabouraud, Josette Rateau, Colette Gambier, M. Valo.
- 1949: Terror of Oklahoma, in collaboration with Yves Robert and Louis Sapin
- 1953: Les Images d'Epinal, directed by Jean-Pierre Grenier, Cabaret La Fontaine des 4 Saisons of Pierre Prévert with Jean Rochefort
- 1954: Les Mystères de Paris by Albert Vidalie after Eugène Sue, directed by Georges Vitaly, Théâtre La Bruyère
- 1955: Les Petites Filles modèles by Albert Vidalie an Louis Sapin, directed by Jean-Pierre Grenier, Cabaret La Fontaine des 4 Saisons
- 1956: La Nuit romaine by Albert Vidalie, directed by Marcelle Tassencourt, Théâtre Hébertot with Roger Hanin

=== Scripts ===
He wrote the scripts for:

- 1951: Terreur en Oklahoma, short film directed by Paul Paviot, with Michel Piccoli
- 1952: Torticola contre Frankensberg, short film directed by Paul Paviot, with Michel Piccoli
- 1952: Chicago-digest, short film directed by Paul Paviot Daniel Gélin
- 1952: Poil de carotte, directed by Paul Mesnier with Raymond Souplex
- 1960: Chien de pique, directed by Yves Allégret with Eddie Constantine
- 1961: Le Capitaine Fracasse (film, 1961) directed by Pierre Gaspard-Huit with Jean Marais
- 1962: Le Cousin de Callao, directed by Jackie Pierre with Roger Hanin
- 1964: La Mégère apprivoisée (Téléfilm - 1964), adaptation of the play by William Shakespeare, directed by Pierre Badel with Bernard Noël
- 1968: Jean-Roch Coignet (TV serial in 7 episodes - 1968), adaptation of the Cahiers du capitaine Coignet, directed by Claude-Jean Bonnardot with Henri Lambert
- 1970: Mandrin (TV serial in 6 episodes - 1972) directed by Philippe Fourastié with Pierre Fabre.

=== Songs ===
- Vidalie wrote numerous texts in collaboration with Jean Wiener for music.
- songs were particularly performed by Serge Reggiani (Les loups sont entrés dans Paris, music by Louis Bessières, La dame de Bordeaux, music by Jacques Datin, Les affreux, music by Louis Bessières),
- Monique Morelli (Chanson canaille, La Java mélancolique)
- Juliette Gréco (La Complainte de Sir Jack l'Éventreur, music by Yves Darriet, (1955)
- Germaine Montero,
- Yves Montand (Actualités, music by Stéphane Golman)
- Jacques Douai (La chanson de Jim)

== Souvenir ==
- The figure of Albert Vidalie is warmly evoked in the novel Monsieur Jadis ou l'École du soir by Antoine Blondin,
