= Jean-Pierre Grenier =

- Born: 20 November 1914; Paris
- Died: 20 February 2000 (aged 85); Fréjus (Var)
- Occupation(s): Actor, theater director, screenwriter
- Spouse: Janine d'Almeida

Jean-Pierre Grenier (20 November 1914 – 20 February 2000) was a French actor, theatre director and screenwriter.

In 1946, Jean-Pierre Grenier, in association with Olivier Hussenot, established "La Compagnie Grenier-Hussenot" which was disbanded in 1957. In 1974, he became director of the théâtre de Boulogne-Billancourt until 1984.

He was the companion of Janine d'Almeida, impresario and producer.

== Filmography ==
=== Actor ===
- 1946 : La Colère des dieux by Karel Lamač
- 1946 : Un rigolo by Georges Chaperot - short film -
- 1949 : Maya by Raymond Bernard - Jean
- 1949 : Daybreak by Louis Daquin
- 1949 : The Perfume of the Lady in Black by Louis Daquin
- 1950 : Justice Is Done by André Cayatte - Jean-Luc Flavier
- 1951 : Skipper Next to God by Louis Daquin
- 1952 : We Are All Murderers by André Cayatte - doctor Destouches
- 1952 : Matrimonial Agency by Jean-Paul Le Chanois - Jacques
- 1953 : La Vie passionnée de Clemenceau by Gilbert Prouteau - documentary - narrator
- 1953 : White Mane d'Albert Lamorisse - narrator
- 1953 : Avant le déluge by André Cayatte - voix uniquement
- 1954 : The Red and the Black by Claude Autant-Lara
- 1955 : Dossier noir by André Cayatte - Gilbert le Guen
- 1957 : Le Mystère de l'atelier quinze short film by André Heinrich and Alain Resnais, narrator

=== Director ===
- 1981: King Vidor et les pionniers d'Hollywood

=== Playwright ===
- 1965: La Bonne Occase by Michel Drach

== Theatre ==
=== Author ===
- Orion le Tueur, melodramatic fantasy in 6 tableaux, 2 enlèvements and a magic ring, by Jean-Pierre Grenier and Maurice Fombeure, Palais de Chaillot, 18 March 1946
- Cœurs en détresse by Jean-Pierre Grenier and Pierre Latour
- L'Enlèvement au bercail by Jean-Pierre Grenier and Pierre Latour
- Justine est r'faite by Jean-Pierre Grenier

=== Comedian ===
- 1938 : Les Fourberies de Scapin by Molière, directed by Léon Chancerel
- 1943 : Jofroi de Jean Giono
- 1944 : Cœurs en détresse by Jean-Pierre Grenier and Pierre Latour, Jardin du Palais-Royal
- 1945 : Les Gueux au paradis by Gaston-Marie Mertens, Studio des Champs-Élysées, Comédie des Champs-Élysées
- 1945 : L'Enlèvement au bercail by Jean-Pierre Grenier and Pierre Latour, mise en scène Jean-Pierre Grenier
- 1946 : La Parade and Orion le tueur by Jean-Pierre Grenier and Maurice Fombeure, mise en scène Jean-Pierre Grenier, Théâtre de la Gaîté-Montparnasse
- 1947 : Liliom by Ferenc Molnár, directed by Jean-Pierre Grenier, Théâtre de la Gaîté-Montparnasse
- 1949 : Les Gaités de l'escadron by Georges Courteline, mise en scène Jean-Pierre Grenier, théâtre de la Renaissance
- 1949 : Les Harengs terribles by Alexandre Breffort, mise en scène Jean-Pierre Grenier, Cabaret Chez Gilles
- 1949 : Un petit air de trempette by Jean Bellanger, mise en scène Jean-Pierre Grenier, Cabaret Chez Gilles
- 1949 : Liliom by Ferenc Molnár, mise en scène Jean-Pierre Grenier, Théâtre de la Renaissance
- 1950 : L'Étranger au théâtre by André Roussin, mise en scène Yves Robert, Cabaret Chez Gilles
- 1950 : Les Gueux au paradis by Gaston-Marie Mertens, Théâtre de la Porte-Saint-Martin
- 1950 : Grenier Hussenot actualités, Cabaret Chez Gilles
- 1950 : Justine est r'faite by Jean-Pierre Grenier, mise en scène Jean-Pierre Grenier, Cabaret La Fontaine des 4 Saisons
- 1951 : Les Trois Mousquetaires by Alexandre Dumas, mise en scène Jean-Pierre Grenier, Théâtre de la Porte-Saint-Martin
- 1952 : Philippe et Jonas by Irwin Shaw, mise en scène Jean-Pierre Grenier, Théâtre de la Gaîté-Montparnasse
- 1953 : L'Huitre et la perle by William Saroyan, mise en scène Jean-Pierre Grenier, Théâtre Fontaine
- 1954 : Responsabilité limitée by Robert Hossein, mise en scène Jean-Pierre Grenier, Théâtre Fontaine
- 1954 : L’Amour des quatre colonels by Peter Ustinov, mise en scène Jean-Pierre Grenier, Théâtre Fontaine
- 1956 : Nemo by Alexandre Rivemale, mise en scène Jean-Pierre Grenier, Théâtre Marigny
- 1956 : L'Hôtel du libre échange by Georges Feydeau, mise en scène Jean-Pierre Grenier, Théâtre Marigny
- 1957 : Romanoff and Juliet by Peter Ustinov, mise en scène Jean-Pierre Grenier, Théâtre Marigny

=== Theatre director ===
- 1943 : Jofroi by Jean Giono
- 1944 : Cœurs en détresse by Jean-Pierre Grenier and Pierre Latour, Jardin du Palais-Royal
- 1945 : L'Enlèvement au bercail by Jean-Pierre Grenier and Pierre Latour
- 1946 : La Parade and Orion le tueur by Jean-Pierre Grenier eandMaurice Fombeure, Théâtre de la Gaîté-Montparnasse
- 1947 : Liliom by Ferenc Molnár, Théâtre de la Gaîté-Montparnasse
- 1948 : L'Escalier by Yves Farge, Théâtre de la Gaîté-Montparnasse
- 1948 : L'Adolescent parfumé by Jean Bellanger, Cabaret Chez Gilles
- 1949 : Les Gaités de l'escadron by Georges Courteline, Théâtre de la Renaissance
- 1949 : Les Harengs terribles by Alexandre Breffort, Cabaret Chez Gilles
- 1949 : Un petit air de trempette by Jean Bellanger, Cabaret Chez Gilles
- 1949 : La Fête du gouverneur by Alfred Adam, Théâtre de la Renaissance
- 1949 : Liliom by Ferenc Molnár, Théâtre de la Renaissance
- 1950 : Grenier Hussenot actualités, Cabaret Chez Gilles
- 1950 : Justine est r'faite by Jean-Pierre Grenier, Cabaret La Fontaine des Quatre-Saisons
- 1951 : The Three Musketeers by Alexandre Dumas, Théâtre de la Porte-Saint-Martin
- 1952 : Le Sire de Vergy by Robert de Flers, Gaston Arman de Caillavet, Théâtre La Bruyère
- 1952 : L'École du crime, Cabaret La Fontaine des Quatre-Saisons
- 1952 : Philippe et Jonas by Irwin Shaw, Théâtre de la Gaîté-Montparnasse
- 1953 : Les Images d'Épinal by Albert Vidalie, Cabaret La Fontaine des Quatre-Saisons
- 1953 : Azouk by Alexandre Rivemale, Théâtre Fontaine
- 1953 : L'Huitre et la perle by William Saroyan, Théâtre Fontaine
- 1953 : Les Images d'Epinal by Albert Vidalie, Cabaret La Fontaine des Quatre-Saisons
- 1954 : Responsabilité limitée by Robert Hossein, Théâtre Fontaine
- 1954 : Le Marché aux puces by André Gillois, Théâtre des Célestins
- 1954 : L’Amour des quatre colonels by Peter Ustinov, Théâtre Fontaine
- 1955 : Les Petites Filles modèles by Albert Vidalie, Cabaret La Fontaine des Quatre-Saisons
- 1956 : Nemo by Alexandre Rivemale, Théâtre Marigny
- 1956 : L'Hôtel du libre échange by Georges Feydeau, Théâtre Marigny
- 1957 : The Visit by Friedrich Dürrenmatt, Théâtre Marigny
- 1957 : Romanoff et Juliette by Peter Ustinov, Théâtre Marigny
- 1958 : L’Amour des quatre colonels by Peter Ustinov, reprise Théâtre de l'Ambigu
- 1958 : Tessa by Jean Giraudoux after Basil Dean and Margaret Kennedy, Théâtre Marigny
- 1958 : L'Étonnant Pennypacker by Liam O'Brien, adaptation Roger Ferdinand, Théâtre Marigny
- 1959 : Le Vélo devant la porte adaptation Marc-Gilbert Sauvajon after Desperate Hours by Joseph Hayes, Théâtre Marigny
- 1959 : Champignol malgré lui by Georges Feydeau, Théâtre Marigny
- 1960 : L'Impasse de la fidélité by Alexandre Breffort, Théâtre des Ambassadeurs
- 1960 : Le Mobile by Alexandre Rivemale, Théâtre Fontaine
- 1961 : Liliom by Ferenc Molnár, Théâtre de l'Ambigu
- 1962 : La Reine galante by André Castelot, Théâtre des Ambassadeurs
- 1963 : L'Assassin de la générale by Albert Husson, Théâtre Michel
- 1964 : Croque-monsieur by Marcel Mithois, Théâtre Saint-Georges
- 1964 : Jo by Claude Magnier, Théâtre des Nouveautés
- 1965 : La Calèche by Jean Giono, Théâtre Sarah Bernhardt
- 1966 : La Bouteille à l'encre by Albert Husson, Théâtre Saint-Georges
- 1967 : Saint Dupont by Marcel Mithois, Théâtre de la Renaissance
- 1969 : La Vie parisienne by Jacques Offenbach, libretto Henri Meilhac and Ludovic Halévy, Théâtre des Célestins
- 1970 : Au théâtre ce soir : Match by Michel Fermaud, TV director Pierre Sabbagh, Théâtre Marigny
- 1970 : L'Amour masqué by Sacha Guitry, Théâtre du Palais-Royal
- 1970 : Les Sincères by Marivaux, with the students of the Centre d'Art Dramatique de la rue Blanche
- 1970 : Le Bonnet du fou by Luigi Pirandello, with the students of the Centre d'Art Dramatique de la rue Blanche
- 1970 : Le Dindon by Georges Feydeau, with the students of the Centre d'Art Dramatique de la rue Blanche
- 1970 : Pourquoi m'avez-vous posée sur le palier ? by Catherine Peter Scot, Théâtre Saint-Georges
- 1971 : Le Cheval fou by Jean Giono, Conservatoire national supérieur d'art dramatique
- 1972 : The Vegetable by F. Scott Fitzgerald, Théâtre Hébertot
- 1973 : Un piano dans l'herbe by Françoise Sagan

=== Operas ===
- 1954 : Die Entführung aus dem Serail by Mozart, Aix-en-Provence Festival
- 1955 : Orfeo ed Euridice by Christoph Willibald Gluck, Opéra de Genève
- 1955 : Mireille by Charles Gounod, Aix-en-Provence Festival
- 1955 : Roméo et Juliette by Hector Berlioz, Paris
- 1956 : Platée by Jean-Philippe Rameau, Aix-en-Provence Festival
- 1957 : Carmen by Georges Bizet, Aix-en-Provence Festival
- 1958 : The Magic Flute by Mozart, Aix-en-Provence Festival
- 1959 : Carmen by Georges Bizet, Santander
- 1961 : Le comte Ory by Gioachino Rossini, Opéra de Strasbourg
- 1961 : The Magic Flute by Mozart, Aix-en-Provence Festival
- 1963 : The Magic Flute by Mozart, Aix-en-Provence Festival
- 1964 : Platée by Jean-Philippe Rameau, Aix-en-Provence Festival
- 1965 : The Magic Flute by Mozar], Aix-en-Provence Festival
- 1969 : Die Fledermaus by Johann Strauss II, Opéra-Comique
- 1969 : La Vie parisienne by Jacques Offenbach, Théâtre des Célestins
- 1970: L'Amour masqué by Sacha Guitry and André Messager, Théâtre des Célestins, Théâtre du Palais-Royal
- 1970 : L'italiana in Algeri by Gioachino Rossini, Aix-en-Provence Festival
- 1971 : The Magic Flute by Mozart, Aix-en-Provence Festival
- 1971 : Il tabarro by Giacomo Puccini, Opéra de Paris
- 1972 : Die Fledermaus by Johann Strauss fils, Opéra de Monte-Carlo

== Publications ==
- Orion le Tueur, script by Jean-Pierre Grenier, dialogue and songs by Maurice Fombeure, Bordas, 1946 BNF=321936889
- Grenier, Jean-Pierre (1992). En passant par la scène (in French). Besançon: Editions La Manufacture. ISBN 273770314X.
