= Danny Boy et ses Pénitents =

Danny Boy et ses Pénitents is a French rock'n'roll, twist and beat band of the 1960s whose singer was Danny Boy, real name Claude Piron, born on 25 January 1936 in Saint-Pierre-de-Cormeilles (Eure). The four musicians (Penitents) who accompanied Danny Boy were wearing a balaclava.

Claude Piron can be considered one of the first French rock singers. He began his solo career in 1958 with a successful Kalin Twins cover When, renamed Viens. He recorded his first record under his real name, before taking in 1960 the pseudonym of Danny Boy and then formed Danny Boy et ses Pénitents, composed of Bruno (guitar), Ralai (guitar), Marc (bass guitar) and Jose (drums).

Their first hits: Un collier de tes bras, Un coup au cœur, C'est encore une souris, Je ne veux plus être un dragueur, revealed Piron's tone of voice particularly well hit and plain, which distinguishes it from other singers. Other notable hits: C'est tout comme, Danny Boy, Croque la pomme….

In 1962, Danny Boy et ses Pénitents toured for eight months with circus Pinder. In 1967, they also toured with Vince Taylor.

Danny Boy is also an actor. He played in a French-Italian film in 1964: La Difficulté d'être infidèle (The difficulty of being unfaithful), directed by Bernard Toublanc-Michel and nominated to the 14th Berlin International Film Festival for the "Golden Bear".

Danny Boy made his return on stage in 2004 together with the Vinyls.

== Discography ==
=== As Claude Piron ===
1958

- Mon cœur bat / À coups de dents / Allez ! allez ! / Le juke box est en panne /, Ducretet-Thomson
- Viens / Docteur miracle / Hé ! Youla / D'où reviens-tu Billie Boy ? /, Ducretet-Thomson
- La chanson de Tom Pouce / Plus grand / Oui, mais plus tard / Dans la vie /, Ducretet-Thomson

1959

- Oh Why / Rock et guitare / Sing sing sing / Cha cha choo choo /, Ducretet-Thomson
- Carina / Je voudrais retrouver son pardon / Le monde change / Les cheveux roux /, Ducretet-Thomson
- Marion / Oh Carol / Tilt / Mon amour tu me blesses /, Ducretet-Thomson

=== As Danny Boy ===
1961

- Je ne veux plus être un dragueur / Un collier de tes bras / C'est encore une souris / Un coup au cœur /, Ricordi
- Croque la pomme / C'est tout comme / Et puis voilà / Danny Boy /, Ricordi

1962

- Twistez / Dum dum / Ah quel massacre / Avec un dollar /, Ricordi
- Stop ! / Ha ! ha ! / Le twist de Schubert / Lettre ouverte /, Ricordi
- Il y a longtemps / Où va mon cœur / Kissin'twist / Pour décrocher l'amour /, Ricordi
- Le locomotion / Let's go / Bye bye love / Répondez-nous seigneur /, Ricordi

1963

- Le climb / Girl girl girl / J'ai rêvé / Forget me not /, Ricordi
- Fin de vacances / Ma petite poupée / Hey hey hey / Je reverrai /, Ricordi
- Ma solitude / Pourquoi l'été / Quand tu me dis oui / Quand je te vois danser /, Ricordi

1964

- Longtemps / Infidèle / Tout à l'heure / Quand viendras-tu chez moi /, Bel Air
- Chips / Je ne voudrais pas changer / Très loin d'ici / Hey baby /, Bel Air

== Notes ==
=== Sources ===
- Chalvidant, J.; Mouvet, H. (2001). La belle histoire des groupes de rock français des années 60 (in French). Ed. Fernand Lanore. ISBN 978-2-85157-219-6.
- Louapre, R. (2002). 1958–1968: les années rock en Haute-Normandie (in French). PTC-Ed. du P'tit Normand. ISBN 978-2-906258-70-9.
