= Fourastié =

Fourastié is a surname. Notable people with the surname include:

- Jean Fourastié (1907–1990), French civil servant, economist, professor and public intellectual
- Philippe Fourastié (1940–1982), French director and screenwriter
