= Bernard Tiphaine =

French actor (1938–2021)

- Born: 29 July 1938; Paris, France
- Died: 19 October 2021 (aged 83); Châteauneuf-de-Gadagne, Vaucluse, France
- Occupation: Actor
- Spouse: Claudie
- Children: 2

Bernard Tiphaine (29 July 1938 in Paris – 19 October 2021) was a French actor and artistic director, born on 29 July 1938 in Paris 15th and died on 19 October 2021 in Châteauneuf-de-Gadagne.

He is well-known for his role in The Fire Within with Maurice Ronet and in La Difficulté d'être infidèle.

He is also known for his work in dubbing.

== Personal life ==
His wife Claudie was born in 1930 and died in 1995.

He had 2 children : a daughter, Marion born in 1965 and a son, Gilles born in 1966, deceased in 2005.

He retired during 2018 after being diagnosed with Alzheimer's disease. His daughter Marion announced his death on 19 October 2021, as a result of the disease.

== Dubbing ==
Very active in dubbing, he was notably the French voice of Christopher Walken, Chuck Norris, Donald Sutherland, Barry Bostwick and James Caan, as well as a recurring voice of Jeremy Irons and Harvey Keitel.

In animation, he was the French voice of Bender in Futurama (season 1 to 3), of Dr. Finkelstein in The Nightmare before Christmas, of Anton Ego in Ratatouille and of Jean-Roger Cornichon in the works The Razmoket. In video games, he is also the French voice of President John Henry Eden in Fallout 3 and Riordan in Dragon Age: Origins.

In 2017 he participated, alongside 15 other great French dubbing voices, in the short film On s'est fait doubler !.

== Filmography ==
=== Films ===
- Le Feu follet (1963): Milou
- La Difficulté d'être infidèle (1964): Olivier
- Le Coup de grâce (1965): Mario
- La Dame de pique (1965): Tomsky
- The Second Twin (1966): Vaden
- Deux billets pour Mexico (1967): Julien
- La Maison de campagne (1969): Louis-Philippe de Moncontour
- Céleste (1970): un barbouze
- Un officier de police sans importance (1973): un policier
- La situation est grave... mais pas désespérée (1976)
- Je te tiens, tu me tiens par la barbichette (1979)
- Madame Claude 2 (1981): Robert

=== Television ===
- 1961 : Le Rouge et le Noir de Pierre Cardinal : Norbert de La Mole
- 1965 : En votre âme et conscience, épisode La canne à épée : Mr Steiner
- 1966 : Les Compagnons de Jéhu de Michel Drach
- 1966 : La 99ème minute de François Gir
- 1967 : Salle n^{o} 8 de Jean Dewever et Robert Guez
- 1968 : Les Cinq Dernières Minutes, épisode Les Enfants du faubourg de Claude Loursais
- 1970 : Au théâtre ce soir : Dix Petits Nègres d'Agatha Christie, mise en scène Raymond Gérôme, réalisation Pierre Sabbagh, théâtre Marigny
- 1972 : Au théâtre ce soir : Folie douce de Jean-Jacques Bricaire et Maurice Lasaygues, mise en scène Michel Roux, réalisation Pierre Sabbagh, Théâtre Marigny
- 1973 : Les Cinq Dernières Minutes : Meurtre par intérim de Claude Loursais
- 1973 : Les deux maîtresses d'après Alfred de Musset : Valentin Moreuil
- 1974 : Au théâtre ce soir : Le Sexe faible d'Édouard Bourdet, mise en scène Jacques Charon, réalisation Georges Folgoas, Théâtre Marigny
- 1974 : Entre toutes les femmes de Maurice Cazeneuve
- 1974 : Le deuil sied à Électre d'Eugene O'Neill, réalisation de Maurice Cazeneuve : Adam Brant
- 1976 : Les Douze Légionnaires de Bernard Borderie
- 1977 : Au théâtre ce soir : Les Choutes de Pierre Barillet et Jean-Pierre Grédy, mise en scène Michel Roux, réalisation Pierre Sabbagh, théâtre Marigny
- 1977 : Au théâtre ce soir : L'École des cocottes de Paul Armont et Marcel Gerbidon, mise en scène Jacques Ardouin, réalisation Pierre Sabbagh, théâtre Marigny
- 1978 : Au théâtre ce soir :Le Colonel Chabert d'après Honoré de Balzac, mise en scène Jean Meyer, réalisation Pierre Sabbagh, théâtre Marigny
- 1978 : La Vie comme ça de Jean-Claude Brisseau : Pineau
- 1980 : Au théâtre ce soir : Danse sans musique de Richard Puydorat et Albert Gray d'après Peter Cheyney, mise en scène René Clermont, réalisation Pierre Sabbagh, théâtre Marigny
- 1980 : Les Faucheurs de marguerites de Marcel Camus
- 1984 : Les Cinq Dernières Minutes, épisode La Quadrature des cercles de Jean-Pierre Richard

== Theatre ==
- 1962 : Les Oiseaux rares de Renée Hoste, mise en scène Alfred Pasquali, théâtre Montparnasse
- 1968 : Notre petite ville de Thornton Wilder, mise en scène Raymond Rouleau, théâtre Hébertot
- 1969 : Le monde est ce qu'il est d'Alberto Moravia, mise en scène Pierre Franck, théâtre des Célestins, théâtre de l'Œuvre
- 1971 : Boeing Boeing de Marc Camoletti, mise en scène Christian-Gérard, Comédie-Caumartin : Robert
- 1972 : Folie douce de Jean-Jacques Bricaire et Maurice Lasaygues, mise en scène Michel Roux, théâtre Marigny
- 1974 : Le Sexe faible d'Édouard Bourdet, mise en scène Jean-Laurent Cochet, théâtre de l'Athénée
- 1974 : Le Siècle des lumières de Claude Brulé, mise en scène Jean-Laurent Cochet, théâtre du Palais-Royal
- 1975 : Le Chasseur français de Boris Vian, mise en scène Pierre Perroux, théâtre Présent
- 1976 : L'École des cocottes de Paul Armont et Marcel Gerbidon, mise en scène Jacques Ardouin, théâtre Hébertot
- 1977 : Le Sexe faible d'Édouard Bourdet, mise en scène Jean Meyer, théâtre des Célestins
- 1978 : Le Colonel Chabert d'après Honoré de Balzac, mise en scène Jean Meyer, théâtre des Célestins

== Dubbing ==
=== Film ===
==== Movies ====
- As Christopher Walken : (39 films)
  - La Porte du paradis (1980) : Nathan D. Champion
  - Brainstorm (1983) : D^{r} Michael Anthony Brace
  - Dead Zone (1983) : Johnny Smith
  - Dangereusement vôtre (1985) : Max Zorin
  - Comme un chien enragé (1986) : Brad Whitewood Sr.
  - Biloxi Blues (1988) : le sergent Merwin J. Toomey
  - Hollywood Mistress (1992) : Warren Zell
  - Scam (1993) : Jack Shancks
  - Wayne's World 2 (1993) : Bobby Cahn
  - The Prophecy (1995) : Gabriel
  - Dernières heures à Denver (1995) : "Le manipulateur"
  - Meurtre en suspens (1995) : M. Smith
  - Touch (1997) : Bill Hill
  - Excess Baggage (1997) : Raymond Perkins
  - La Souris (1997) : Caeser, l'exterminateur
  - The Prophecy 2 (1998) : Gabriel
  - The Prophecy 3: The Ascent (2000) : Gabriel
  - Les Opportunistes (2000) : Victor "Vic" Kelly
  - Joe La Crasse (2001) : Clem
  - Couple de stars (2001) : Hal Weidmann
  - L'Affaire du collier (2001) : Cagliostro
  - L'Amour, six pieds sous terre (2002) : Frank Featherbed
  - Les Country Bears (2002) : Reed Thimple
  - Amours troubles (2003) : détective Stanley Jacobellis
  - Kangourou Jack (2003) : Sal Maggio
  - Bienvenue dans la jungle (2003) : Travis
  - Envy (2004) : J-Man
  - Man on Fire (2004) : Rayburn
  - Et l'homme créa la femme (2004) : Mike Willington
  - Click : Télécommandez votre vie (2006) : Morty
  - Man of the Year (2006) : Jack Menken
  - Irish Gangster (2011) : Alex Birns
  - Sept psychopathes (2012) : Hans
  - Jersey Boys (2014) : Angelo « Gyp » DeCarlo
  - Joe La Crasse 2 : Un bon gros loser (2015) : Clem
  - One More Time (2015) : Paul Lombard
  - Eddie the Eagle (2016) : Warren Sharp
  - Ma vie de chat (2016) : Felix Purrkins
  - Mon âme sœur (2018) : Myron
- As Donald Sutherland : (27 films)
  - Crackers (1984) : Weslake
  - Le Carrefour des innocents (1989) : D^{r} Charles Loftis
  - Une saison blanche et sèche (1989) : Ben du Toit
  - Six degrés de séparation (1993) : John Flanders Kettridge
  - Free Money (1998) : Juge Rolf Rausenberg
  - Virus (1999) : Capitaine Robert Everton
  - L'Art de la guerre (2000) : Douglas Thomas
  - 1943, l'ultime révolte (2001) : Adam Czerniaków
  - Sur le chemin de la guerre (2002) : Clark Clifford
  - L'Affaire des cinq lunes (2003) : juge Rosario Saracini
  - Braquage à l'italienne (2003) : John Bridger
  - Des gens impitoyables (2005) : Ogden C. Osborne
  - Orgueil et Préjugés (2005) : M. Bennett
  - American Haunting (2005) : John Bell
  - Demande à la poussière (2006) : Hellfrick
  - À cœur ouvert (2007) : le juge Raines
  - L'Amour de l'or (2008) : Nigel Honeycutt
  - L'Aigle de la Neuvième Légion (2011) : Aquila
  - Comment tuer son boss ? (2011) : Jack Pellit
  - Le Flingueur (2011) : Harry McKenna
  - Hunger Games (2012) : président Corolianus Snow
  - Hunger Games : L'Embrasement (2013) : président Snow
  - The Best Offer (2013) : Billy
  - The Calling (2014) : père Price
  - Hunger Games : La Révolte, partie 1 (2014) : président Snow
  - Hunger Games : La Révolte, partie 2 (2015) : président Snow
  - Forsaken (2015) : le révérend Clayton
- As James Caan : (23 films)
  - Objectif Lune (1968) (doublage tardif de 2013) : Lee Stegler
  - Le Parrain (1972) : Santino « Sonny » Corleone (1^{er} doublage)
  - La Chasse aux dollars (1973) : Dick Kanipsia
  - Le Parrain 2 (1974) : Sonny Corleone (1^{er} doublage)
  - Funny Lady (1975) : Billy Rose
  - Rollerball (1975) : Jonathan E.
  - Tueur d'élite (1975) : Mike Loken
  - Un pont trop loin (1977) : le sergent Eddie Dohun
  - Le Souffle de la tempête (1978) : Frank « Buck » Athearn
  - L'Impossible Témoin (1980) : Thomas Hacklin Jr.
  - Le Solitaire (1981) : Frank
  - Jardins de pierre (1987) : Clell Hazard
  - Futur immédiat, Los Angeles 1991 (1988) : Matthew Sykes
  - Misery (1990) : Paul Sheldon
  - Flesh and Bone (1993) : Roy Sweeney
  - Grand Nord (1996) : Sean McLennon
  - Way of the Gun (2000) : Joe Sarno
  - City of Ghosts (2002) : Marvin
  - Jericho Mansions (2003) : Leonard Grey
  - Elfe (2003) : Walter
  - New York, I Love You (2008) : M. Riccoli
  - Braquage à New York (2010) : Max Saltzman
  - Crazy Dad (2012) : père McNally
- As Chuck Norris : (21 films)
  - La Fureur du dragon (1972) : Colt
  - Les Casseurs (1977) : John David "J.D." Dawes
  - La Fureur du juste (1980) : Scott James
  - Dent pour dent (1981) : Sean Kane
  - Œil pour œil (1983) : J.J. McQuade
  - Portés disparus (1984) : James Braddock
  - Portés disparus 2 (1985) : James Braddock
  - Invasion U.S.A. (1985) : Matt Hunter
  - Delta Force (1986) : Scott McCoy
  - Le Temple d'or (1986) : Max Donigan
  - Portés disparus 3 (1988) : James Braddock
  - Héros (1988) : Danny O'Brien
  - Delta Force 2 (1990) : Scott McCoy
  - L'Arme secrète (1991) : Garrett/Grogan
  - Sidekicks (1992) : lui-même
  - Hellbound (1994) : Frank Shatter
  - Chien d'élite (1995) : Jack Wilder
  - L'Esprit de la forêt (1996) : Jeremiah McKenna (version TV)
  - Dodgeball ! Même pas mal ! (2004) : lui-même
  - Le Sang du diamant (2005) : John Shepherd
  - Expendables 2 : Unité spéciale (2012) : Booker
- As Jeremy Irons : (9 films)
  - Le Mystère von Bülow (1990) : Claus von Bülow
  - Fatale (1992) : Stephen Fleming
  - Une journée en enfer (1995) : Simon Peter Gruber
  - La Panthère rose 2 (2009) : Alonso Avelladena
  - Margin Call (2011) : John Tuld
  - High-Rise (2015) : Anthony Royal
  - Batman v Superman : L'Aube de la Justice (2016) : Alfred Pennyworth
  - Assassin's Creed (2016) : D^{r} Alan Rikkin
  - Justice League (2017) : Alfred Pennyworth
- As Warren Beatty : (8 films)
  - Reds (1981) : John Silas Reed
  - Ishtar (1987) : Lyle Rogers
  - Dick Tracy (1990) : Dick Tracy
  - In Bed with Madonna (1991) : lui-même
  - Bugsy (1991) : Bugsy Siegel
  - Bulworth (1998) : Jay Billington Bulworth
  - Potins mondains et amnésies partielles (2001) : Porter Stoddard
  - L'Exception à la règle (2016) : Howard Hughes
- As Kris Kristofferson : (8 films)
  - Blade (1998) : Abraham Whistler
  - Blade 2 (2002) : Abraham Whistler
  - Blade: Trinity (2004) : Abraham Whistler
  - Les Copains des neiges (2008) : Talon (voix)
  - Points de rupture (2008) : Randall
  - Ce que pensent les hommes (2009) : Ken Murphy
  - Bloodworth (en) (2010) : E. F. Bloodworth
  - L'Incroyable Histoire de Winter le dauphin 2 (2014) : Reed Haskett
- As Harry Dean Stanton : (7 films)
  - De l'or pour les braves (1970) : Willard
  - Slam Dance (1987) : Benjamin Smiley
  - She's So Lovely (1997) : Tony 'Shorty' Russo
  - The Pledge (2001) : Floyd Cage
  - This Must Be the Place (2011) : Robert Plath
  - Avengers (2012) : le gardien du hangar détruit
  - Le Dernier Rempart (2013) : le fermier
- As Harvey Keitel : (7 films)
  - Mafia Salad (1986) : Bobby Dilea
  - Une nuit en enfer (1996) : Jacob Fuller
  - Petits meurtres entre nous (1996) : George
  - Cop Land (1997) : Ray Donlan
  - Benjamin Gates et le Trésor des Templiers (2004) : Peter Sadusky
  - Benjamin Gates et le Livre des secrets (2007) : Peter Sadusky
  - Le Congrès (2013) : Al
- As John Hurt : (6 films)
  - La Nuit de l'évasion (1982) : Peter Strelzyk
  - Partners (1982) : Kerwin
  - 1984 (1984) : Winston Smith
  - Scandal (1989) : Stephen Ward
  - Dead Man (1995) : John Scholfield
  - Brighton Rock (2010) : Phil Corkery
  - Les Immortels (2011) : le vieil homme
- As Elliott Gould : (6 films)
  - Ocean's Eleven (2001) : Reuben Tishkoff
  - Ocean's Twelve (2004) : Reuben Tishkoff
  - Ocean's Thirteen (2007) : Reuben Tishkoff
  - Contagion (2011) : D^{r} Ian Sussman
  - Le Noël de mes rêves (2012) : Sam Finkelstein
  - Ocean's 8 (2018) : Reuben Tishkoff
- As Dennis Hopper : (6 films)
  - Une trop belle cible (1990) : Milo
  - Search and Destroy (1995) : D^{r} Luther Waxling
  - Basquiat (1996) : Bruno Bischofberger
  - Jesus' Son (en) (1999) : Bill
  - Coup de maître (2000) : Gianni Ponti
  - Les Hommes de main (2001) : Benny Chains
- Peter Fonda dans : (5 films)
  - Easy Rider (1969) : Wyatt
  - Les Mercenaires (1976) : Mike Bradley
  - L'Or de la vie (1997) : Ulee Jackson
  - Bande de sauvages (2007) : Damien Blade
  - Les Anges de Boston 2 (2009) : The Roman
- As Scott Glenn : (5 films)
  - Training Day (2001) : Roger
  - Écrire pour exister (2007) : Steve Gruwell
  - W. : L'Improbable Président (2008) : Donald Rumsfeld
  - Sucker Punch (2011) : le Sage
  - Paperboy (2012) : W.W. Jansen
- As Stacy Keach : (5 films)
  - Chicago Overcoat (2009) : Ray Berkowski
  - Truth : Le Prix de la vérité (2015) : Bill Burkett
  - Cell (2016) : Charles Ardai
  - Gold (2017) : Clive Coleman
  - Gotti (2018) : Aniello Dellacroce
- As Ian McShane : (4 films)
  - Salaud (1971) : Wolfe Lissner
  - La Cible hurlante (1972) : Birdy Williams
  - Scoop (2006) : Joe Strumble
  - Pirates des Caraïbes : La Fontaine de jouvence (2011) : capitaine Edward Teach / Barbe-Noire
- As Anthony Perkins : (4 films)
  - Quelqu'un derrière la porte (1971) : Laurence Jeffries
  - Les Loups de haute mer (1979) : Lou Kramer
  - Psychose 2 (1983) : Norman Bates
  - Psychose 3 (1986) : Norman Bates
- As Sam Elliott : (4 films)
  - The Alibi (2006) : The Mormon
  - À la croisée des mondes : La Boussole d'or (2007) : Lee Scoresby
  - Où sont passés les Morgan ? (2009) : Clay Wheeler
  - In the Air (2009) : Maynard Finch
- As Peter Coyote :
  - A Grande Arte (1991) : Mandrake
  - Docteur Patch (1998) : Bill Davis
  - Northfork (2003) : Eddie
- As Peter Simonischek :
  - Rouge rubis (2013) : Comte Saint-Germain
  - Bleu saphir (2014) : Comte Saint-Germain
  - Vert émeraude (2016) : Comte Saint-Germain
- As Richard Jordan :
  - Yakuza (1974) : Dusty
  - Le Secret de mon succès (1987) : Howard Prescott
- As Michael Murphy :
  - Manhattan (1979) : Yale
  - L'Année de tous les dangers (1982) : Pete Curtis
- As Paul Gleason :
  - The Breakfast Club (1985) : Richard Vernon
  - Sex Academy (2001) : Richard Vernon
- As Lance Henriksen :
  - Aliens, le retour (1986) : Bishop (scène supplémentaire de la version longue)
  - Chasse à l'homme (1993) : Emil Fouchon
- As John Mahoney :
  - Éclair de lune (1987) : Perry
  - Les Filous (1987) : Moe Adams
- As Burt Reynolds :
  - Malone, un tueur en enfer (1987) : Malone
  - King Rising, au nom du roi (2007) : Roi Konreid
- As Terence Stamp :
  - Le Sicilien (1987) : Prince Borsa
  - Song for Marion (2012) : Arthur Harris
- As Tom Skerritt :
  - Texas Rangers : La Revanche des justiciers (2001) : Richard Dukes
  - Whiteout (2009) : D^{r} Fury
- As Ron Leibman :
  - Auto Focus (2002) : Lenny
  - Garden State (2004) : D^{r} Cohen
- As Gene Hackman :
  - Le Maître du jeu (2003) : Rankin Finch
  - Bienvenue à Mooseport (2004) : Monroe Cole
- As Geoffrey Lewis :
  - Blueberry, l'expérience secrète (2004) : Greg Sullivan
  - The Devil's Rejects (2005) : Roy Sullivan
- As Peter O'Toole :
  - Lassie (2005) : Duke
  - Stardust, le mystère de l'étoile (2007) : le roi de Stormhold
- As Alan Alda :
  - Le Casse de Central Park (2011) : Arthur Shaw
  - Peace, Love et plus si affinités (2012) : Carvin
- Others :
  - 1965 : Super 7 appelle le Sphinx : Martin Stevens dit « Super 7 » (Roger Browne)
  - 1966 : La Curée : Maxime Saccard (Peter McEnery)
  - 1967 : Tire encore si tu peux : l'étranger métis (Tomás Milián)
  - 1968 : Barbarella : l'Ange (John Phillip Law)
  - 1968 : Duffy, le renard de Tanger : l'espagnol, fournisseur d'armes (Tutte Lemkow)
  - 1968 : Les Feux de l'enfer : Greg Parker (Jim Hutton)
  - 1968 : Chacun pour soi : Manolo Sanchez (George Hilton)
  - 1969 : Fleur de Cactus : Igor Sullivan (Rick Lenz)
  - 1969 : Sept hommes pour Tobrouk : Charlie (Fabrizio Moroni)
  - 1969 : À l'aube du cinquième jour : Enseigne Bruno Grauber (Franco Nero)
  - 1970 : Airport : le jeune passager à lunettes^{[Qui ?]}
  - 1970 : Les Cicatrices de Dracula : Simon Carlson (Dennis Waterman)
  - 1970 : La Fille de Ryan : commandant Randolph Doryan (Christopher Jones)
  - 1970 : Campus : Jake (Harrison Ford)
  - 1971 : Le Dossier Anderson : Spencer (Dick Anthony Williams)
  - 1971 : Ce plaisir qu'on dit charnel : Jonathan Fuerst (Jack Nicholson)
  - 1971 : Les Chiens de paille : Harry Niles (David Warner)
  - 1971 : Big Jake : Michael McCandles (Christopher Mitchum)
  - 1971 : Les Cavaliers : Mukhi (David de Keyser)
  - 1972 : Cosa Nostra : Buster (Franco Borelli)
  - 1972 : Massacre : Dominic Hoffo (Rip Torn)
  - 1973 : Mondwest : un technicien (Robert Patten)
  - 1973 : Complot à Dallas : Tim (Colby Chester)
  - 1973 : L'Exécuteur noir : l'inspecteur Reynolds (Brock Peters)
  - 1974 : Flesh Gordon : le prince Pédalo (Lance Larsen)
  - 1975 : Supervixens : Clint Ramsey (Charles Pitts)
  - 1975 : La Trahison (film, 1975) : Charles Lord (Timothy Dalton)
  - 1976 : Le Voyage des damnés : le premier officier (David Daker)
  - 1976 : C'est arrivé entre midi et trois heures : M. Foster (Howard Brunner)
  - 1977 : Annie Hall : l'homme au cinéma (Russell Horton)
  - 1977 : La Dernière Vague : David Burton (Richard Chamberlain)
  - 1978 : Le Jeu de la puissance : Colonel Hakim^{[Qui ?]}
  - 1978 : La Fureur du danger : Roger Deal (Robert Klein)
  - 1978 : Sauvez le Neptune : Lieutenant Phillips (Christopher Reeve)
  - 1978 : Le Chat qui vient de l'espace : M. Stallwood (Roddy McDowall)
  - 1978 : La Grande Bataille : le chef du commando de parachutistes (Giacomo Rossi Stuart)
  - 1978 : Les Sept Cités d'Atlantis : Atmir (Michael Gothard)
  - 1978 : Mon nom est Bulldozer : un soldat (Riccardo Pizzuti)
  - 1979 : Le Cavalier électrique : Dietrich (James B. Sikking)
  - 1979 : Yanks : John (William Devane)
  - 1980 : Garçonne : Paul (Eric Allen)
  - 1980 : Le Lion du désert : le prince Amedeo (Sky du Mont)
  - 1981 : New York 1997 : Romero (Frank Doubleday)
  - 1982 : Le Choix de Sophie : Nathan (Kevin Kline)
  - 1982 : Frances : Clifford Odets (Jeffrey DeMunn)
  - 1982 : Gandhi : Pandit Jawaharlal Nehru (Roshan Seth)
  - 1982 : Grease 2 : M. Stuart (Tab Hunter)
  - 1982 : Les Guerriers du Bronx : Hot Dog (Christopher Connelly)
  - 1983 : Vendicator : Nesfero (Johnny Monteiro)
  - 1983 : Wargames : M. Lightman (William Bogert)
  - 1984 : Le Bounty : John Fryer (Daniel Day-Lewis)
  - 1984 : Il était une fois en Amérique : James Conway O'Donnell (Treat Williams) (1^{er} doublage)
  - 1984 : Birdy : M. Columbato (Sandy Baron) (1^{er} doublage)
  - 1984 : Marathon Killer : Pete Canfield (Ronny Cox)
  - 1985 : Le Secret de la pyramide : le professeur Rathe (Anthony Higgins)
  - 1985 : D.A.R.Y.L. : Andy Richardson (Michael McKean) (1^{er} doublage)
  - 1985 : Santa Claus : BZ (John Lithgow)
  - 1985 : L'Année du dragon : Joey Tai (John Lone)
  - 1985 : Tutti Frutti : Frère Constance (Jay Patterson)
  - 1985 : Natty Gann : Sol Gann (Ray Wise)
  - 1985 : Teen Wolf : Harold Howard (James Hampton)
  - 1986 : Peggy Sue s'est mariée : Jack Kelcher (Don Murray)
  - 1986 : Les Coulisses du pouvoir : le candidat sénateur de l'Ohio Jerome Cade (J. T. Walsh)
  - 1986 : Highlander : Ron Berglas (Erik Powell)
  - 1986 : Le Flic était presque parfait : le marchand d'armes (Austin Pendleton)
  - 1986 : À propos d'hier soir... : Mr. Favio (George DiCenzo)
  - 1987 : Extrême préjudice : Larry McRose (Clancy Brown)
  - 1988 : Élémentaire, mon cher... Lock Holmes : l'inspecteur Lestrade (Jeffrey Jones)
  - 1988 : Vendredi 13, chapitre 7 : Un nouveau défi : le docteur Crews (Terry Kiser)
  - 1988 : Y a-t-il un flic pour sauver la reine ? : Vincent Ludwig (Ricardo Montalbán)
  - 1988 : La Septième Prophétie : le révérend (John Heard)
  - 1988 : Les Clowns tueurs venus d'ailleurs : le shérif Curtis Mooney (John Vernon)
  - 1988 : Colors : Melindez (Rudy Ramos)
  - 1989 : Calme blanc : le docteur (George Shevtsov)
  - 1989 : L'Amour est une grande aventure : Jake Fedderman (Joel Brooks)
  - 1989 : L'Aventure extraordinaire d'un papa peu ordinaire : Domingo Villaverde (Jean Carlo Simancas)
  - 1990 : Henry et June : Henry Miller (Fred Ward)
  - 1990 : Le Bûcher des vanités : Sir Gerald Moore (Robert Stephens)
  - 1990 : L'Exorciste, la suite : le docteur Temple (Scott Wilson)
  - 1990 : Fire Birds : Brad Little (Tommy Lee Jones)
  - 1990 : Affaires privées : Nicholas Hollander (Mike Figgis)
  - 1991 : Le Festin nu : Bill Lee (Peter Weller)
  - 1991 : La Manière forte : Party Crasher (Stephen Lang)
  - 1991 : Ombres et Brouillard : l'étrangleur (Michael Kirby)
  - 1992 : Bob Roberts : Lukas Hart III (Alan Rickman)
  - 1992 : Christophe Colomb : La découverte : Ferdinand II d'Aragon (Tom Selleck)
  - 1992 : La Loi de la nuit : Phil Nasseros (Cliff Gorman)
  - 1993 : Tombstone : Curly Bill Brocius (Powers Boothe)
  - 1993 : Le Concierge du Bradbury : Gene Salvatore (Dan Hedaya)
  - 1993 : Madame Doubtfire : Stuart Dunmeyer (Pierce Brosnan)
  - 1993 : L'Extrême Limite : Max Waxman (Jonathan Banks)
  - 1996 : Du Vent dans les saules : le chef des belettes (Anthony Shyer)
  - 1996 : Lame de fond : Francis Beaumont (David Selby)
  - 1997 : Tennessee Valley : Reece McHenry (Sam Shepard)
  - 1997 : Dans l'ombre de Manhattan : Morgenstern (Ron Leibman)
  - 1997 : Le Nouvel Espion aux pattes de velours : Mr. Flint (Dean Jones)
  - 1998 : Un tueur pour cible : Terence Wei (Kenneth Tsang)
  - 1998 : Still Crazy : De retour pour mettre le feu : Ray Simms (Bill Nighy)
  - 1998 : Préjudice : Al Eustis (Sydney Pollack)
  - 1999 : Man on the Moon : Ed Weinberger (Peter Bonerz)
  - 1999 : Agnes Browne : Tom Jones (dans son propre rôle)
  - 1999 : Anna et le Roi : général Alak (Randall Duk Kim)
  - 2000 : Un thé avec Mussolini : Mussolini (Claudio Spadaro)
  - 2002 : American Party : Vance Wilder Sr. (Tim Matheson)
  - 2002 : Influences : Cary Launer (Ryan O'Neal)
  - 2002 : Le Club des empereurs : Sénateur Bell (Harris Yulin)
  - 2004 : Melinda et Melinda : Max (Larry Pine)
  - 2004 : Tout ou rien : Vincent « Vince » Hopgood (Paul Hogan)
  - 2005 : The Weather Man : Robert Spritzel (Michael Caine)
  - 2005 : A History of Violence : Carl Fogarty (Ed Harris)
  - 2006 : The Holiday : Dustin Hoffman (dans son propre rôle)
  - 2006 : Jugez-moi coupable : Nick Calabrese (Alex Rocco)
  - 2006 : Mon vrai père et moi : Doug Clayton (Edward Herrmann)
  - 2007 : Hot Fuzz : le révérend Philip Shooter (Paul Freeman)
  - 2007 : Shoot 'Em Up : Que la partie commence : Hammerson (Stephen McHattie)
  - 2007 : Kill Bobby Z : Johnson (Keith Carradine)
  - 2007 : Juno : Mac McGuff (J. K. Simmons)
  - 2007 : The Lookout : Robert Pratt (Bruce McGill)
  - 2008 : Rien que pour vos cheveux : le père de Zohan (Shelley Berman)
  - 2008 : L'Échange : Sammy Hahn (Geoff Pierson)
  - 2008 : Day Watch : Zavulon (Viktor Verjbitski)
  - 2009 : Fanboys : lui-même (William Shatner)
  - 2009 : Hannah Montana, le film : M. Bradley (Barry Bostwick)
  - 2010 : Double identity : l'ambassadeur Abilov (Harry Anichkin)
  - 2011 : Hobo with a Shotgun : le chef de la police (Jeremy Akerman)
  - 2013 : Wolverine : Le Combat de l'immortel : Yashida/Samouraï d'Argent (Hal Yamanouchi)
  - 2014 : X-Men: Days of Future Past : sénateur Brickman (Michael Lerner)
  - 2015 : Cendrillon : le Roi (Derek Jacobi)
  - 2016 : Joyeuse fête des mères : Lance Wallace (Hector Elizondo)
  - 2017 : Death Note : le capitaine Russel (Michael Shamus Wiles)

==== Animation ====
- 1965 : Sur la piste de l'Ouest sauvage : Le cheval de la Terreur
- 1985 : Taram et le Chaudron magique : le Seigneur des Ténèbres (2^{e} doublage)
- 1993 : L'Étrange Noël de monsieur Jack : D^{r} Finkelstein
- 1994 : Le Roi lion : Scar (voix initiale)
- 1998 : Les Razmoket, le film : Jean-Roger, Charles
- 2000 : Les Razmoket à Paris, le film : Jean-Roger, Charles
- 2001 : Barbie Casse-Noisette : commandant Menthe
- 2002 : Barbie, princesse Raiponce : le roi Frederick
- 2003 : Les Razmoket rencontrent les Delajungle : Jean-Roger, Charles
- 2004 : Balto 3 : Sur l'aile du vent : Kirby
- 2007 : Ratatouille : Anton Ego
- 2010 : Alpha et Oméga : Tony
- 2011 : Eden : Dieu
- 2013 : Ma maman est en Amérique, elle a rencontré Buffalo Bill : Mr. Ferret
- 2015 : Le Petit Prince : le professeur
- 2015 : Objectif Lune : Frank
- 2016 : La Ligue des justiciers vs. les Teen Titans : Ra's Al Ghul
- 2017 : Batman vs Double-Face : Alfred Pennyworth

==== Short films ====
- 2017 : On s'est fait doubler ! : l'agent stoïque (Jean-Gilles Barbier)

=== Television ===
==== Telefilms ====
- Tom Skerritt dans :
  - Cœurs en feu (1992) : Jarrett Mattison
  - La prophétie de la haine (1997) : Steve Riordan
  - Les secrets du silence (1997) : Norm Jenkins
  - Aftershock : Tremblement de terre à New York (1999) : Thomas Ahearn
  - La guérison du cœur (2002) : Johnny Pinkley
  - Cyclone Catégorie 7 : Tempête mondiale (2005) : le colonel Mike Davis
  - La Colline aux adieux (2005) : Fritz Grier
  - Mammouth, la résurrection (2006) : Simon Abernathy
  - Désolation (2006) : John Edward Marinville
  - Alerte tsunamis (2007) : Victor Bannister
  - Un amour ne meurt jamais (2011) : Jack Conners
- Donald Sutherland dans :
  - Quicksand: No Escape (1992) : Murdoch
  - Citizen X (1995) : colonel Mikhail Fetisov
  - CSS Hunley, le premier sous-marin (1999) : général Beauregard
  - Trafic d'innocence (2005) : agent Bill Meehan
  - Moby Dick (2011) : père Mapple
  - L'Île au trésor (2012) : Flint
- Winston Rekert dans :
  - L'amour en cadeau (2003) : Joe Cunningham
  - L'étoile de Noël (2004) : William Simon
  - Le Secret de Hidden Lake (2006) : Frank Dolan
  - Tornades sur New York (2008) : D^{r} Lars Liggenhorn
  - L'enfer du feu (2008) : Hank
  - L'aventure de Noël (2009) : Nick Stanley
- Chuck Norris dans :
  - La Colère du tueur (1998) : Jake Fallon
  - L'Homme du président (2000) : Joshua McCord
  - Action Force (2002) : Joshua McCord
  - Walker, Texas Ranger : La Machination (2005) : Cordell Walker
- George Hamilton dans :
  - Danielle Steel : Disparu (1995) : Malcolm Patterson
  - Scandale à Hollywood (2004) : Woody Prentice
  - Un Noël trop cool (2004) : Père Noël
- Stacy Keach dans :
  - Ciel de glace (2003) : Pete Crane
  - Le Trésor de Barbe-Noire (2006) : Benjamin Hornigold
  - Nanny Express (2008) : révérend MacGregor
- Barry Bostwick dans :
  - L'Amour à l'horizon (2007) : Martin Harper
  - Tempête à Las Vegas (2013) : Sal
  - Romance sous les étoiles (2015) : Walt
- Cal Bartlett dans :
  - Turbulences en plein vol (2010) : général Caldwell
  - Portées disparues (2013) : le shérif
  - Les doutes de Scarlett (2016) : le maire Ron Anderson
- Art Hindle dans :
  - Une proie certaine (2011) : l'agent spécial Leonard Heisman
  - Le Bébé de Noël (2012) : Christopher Davidson
  - Dévorée par l'ambition (2013) : Ralph Mickelson
- Ray Baker dans :
  - Rapt (1986) : Donald F. Donald
  - 44 minutes de terreur (2003) : Harris
- Christopher Walken dans :
  - Le Combat de Sarah (1993) : Jacob Witting
  - Arnaques en Jamaïque (1993) : Jack Shanks
- Dennis Hopper dans :
  - Chasseur de sorcières (1994) : Harry Philippe Lovecraft
  - Samson et Dalila (1996) : le général Tariq
- James Brolin dans :
  - Panique sur le vol 285 (1996) : Ron Showman
  - Un mariage malgré tout ! (2006) : gouverneur Conrad Welling
- Elliott Gould dans :
  - Romance millésimée (2009) : Paul Browning
  - La Cerise sur le gâteau de mariage (2014) : Max Barnworth
- Others:
  - 1972 : Le Loup de la nuit : Andrew Rodanthe (Bradford Dillman)
  - 1985 : Blackout : L'obsession d'un flic : Allen Devlin (Keith Carradine)
  - 1985 : Meurtre au crépuscule : Roland (Frederick Coffin)
  - 1985 : Perdus dans la ville : Marty Campbell (Richard Thomas)
  - 1985 : Cœur en sursis : Larry Weisman (Jeffrey DeMunn)
  - 1986 : La loi du silence : le commandant Kendall Laird (John Lithgow)
  - 1986 : Agent orange : Clifton (Terrance Ellis)
  - 1987 : L'Impossible Alibi : Harry Nash (Ed Harris)
  - 1988 : Les passions oubliées : Michael Bredon (Christopher Cazenove)
  - 1988 : Jack l'Éventreur : sergent George Godley (Lewis Collins)
  - 1988 : Les Voyageurs de l'infini : commandant Jacob Brown (Duncan Regehr)
  - 1989 : On a tué mes enfants : Frank Joziak (John Shea)
  - 1989 : La rage de vivre : Wayne (Joseph Hacker)
  - 1990 : Enterré vivant : Cortland 'Cort' van Owen (William Atherton)
  - 1990 : Mort au sommet : Robert « Bob » Craig (John Gowans)
  - 1991 : Confusion tragique : Ernest Twigg (John M. Jackson)
  - 1992 : Cauchemar en plein jour : Sean (Christopher Reeve)
  - 1992 : Double verdict : Warren Blackburn (Peter Strauss)
  - 1993 : De parents inconnus : Del Smith (Gordon Clapp)
  - 1993 : L'Affaire Amy Fisher : Désignée coupable : le juge Marvin Goodman (Mort Sertner)
  - 1994 : Dans le piège de l'oubli : D^{r} Winslow (Paul Sorvino)
  - 1994 : Honore ton père et ta mère : la véritable histoire des meurtres de Menendez : José Menéndez (James Farentino)
  - 1994 : L'Homme aux deux épouses : Martin Hightower (Peter Weller)
  - 1995 : La part du mensonge : Stuart Quinn (David Dukes)
  - 1996 : Les Voyages de Gulliver : empereur de Liliput (Peter O'Toole)
  - 1996 : Péchés oubliés : D^{r}. Richard Ofshe (William Devane)
  - 1998 : La Proie du collectionneur : capitaine Swaggert (Bruce Dern)
  - 1999 : La ville des légendes de l'Ouest : shérif Forrest (Sam Shepard)
  - 1999 : Double Trahison : un médecin de l’hôpital (?)
  - 2000 : Point limite : le président (Richard Dreyfuss)
  - 2000 : Un intrus dans la famille : D^{r} Fortunato (Ric Reid)
  - 2001 : Une vie pour deux : Steven Hastings (Peter Coyote)
  - 2001 : La Ballade de Lucy Whipple : Jonas Scatter (Bruce McGill)
  - 2002 : Blood Crime : shérif Morgan McKenna (James Caan)
  - 2003 : Ultimate Limit : Pacheco Laval (Stephen J. Cannell)
  - 2005 : La rose noire : Martin Darius / Peter Lake (Scott Glenn)
  - 2006 : The Black Hole, le trou noir : le général Ryker (David Selby)
  - 2008 : 24: Redemption : Jonas Hodges (Jon Voight)
  - 2010 : Une lueur d'espoir : Jess Sanford (Sam Elliott)
  - 2010 : La femme de trop : le commentateur radio (Joel Haberli)
  - 2011 : Planète Terre en danger : Rothman (Bruce Davison)
  - 2011 : Allemagne 1918 : général Walther von Lüttwitz (Hans-Michael Rehberg)
  - 2011 : Un mariage en cadeau : le révérend Paul (John Colton)
  - 2012 : Coup de foudre à 3 temps : Drew (Chris Gillett)
  - 2012 : La Saison des amours : Jim Landon (Barry Van Dyke)
  - 2013 : Sa dernière course : Rudolf (Otto Mellies)
  - 2014 : Sous le charme de Noël : le père de Jenna (Ray Laska)
  - 2015 : Juste à temps pour Noël : l'homme à la calèche (William Shatner)
  - 2016 : L'envie d'être mère : Mikey (Shawn Lawrence)
  - 2016 : Une inquiétante infirmière : Wayne (John Novak)

==== TV series ====
- Barry Bostwick dans :
  - Spin City (1996-2002) : Randall Winston
  - Lexx (1997) : Thodin (saison 1, épisode 1)
  - Scrubs (2003) : M. Randolf (saison 3, épisode 9)
  - New York, unité spéciale (2004-2007) : Oliver Gates
  - Las Vegas (2005) : Martin (saison 3, épisode 11)
  - Ce que j'aime chez toi (2005-2006) : Jack Tyler
  - Ugly Betty (2008) : Roger Adams
  - Supernatural (2009) : Jay (saison 4, épisode 12)
  - Ghost Whisperer (2009) : Don Sullivan (saison 5, épisode 3)
  - Nip/Tuck (2009) : Roger Payne (saison 6, épisode 1)
  - Forgotten (2010) : Bill Ramey (saison 1, épisode 12)
  - Glee (2010) : Tim Stanwick (saison 2, épisode 5)
  - Cougar Town (2010-2014) : Roger Frank
  - Scandal (2013) : Jerry Grant
  - New Girl (2014) : Robert Goodwin (saison 4, épisode 11)
- Elliott Gould dans :
  - Friends (1994-2003) : Jack Geller
  - Shining (1997) : Stuart Ullman
  - It's Like, You Know... (1999-2001) : lui-même
  - Voilà ! (2000) : lui-même
  - Las Vegas (2003) : le professeur (saison 1, épisode 4)
  - Hercule Poirot (2005), épisode Le Train bleu Rufus van Aldin
  - Les Maîtres de l'horreur (2006) : Barney (saison 2, épisode 7)
  - Drop Dead Diva (2009) : Larry Baxter (saison 1, épisode 6)
  - New York, police judiciaire (2009) : Stan Arkavy (saison 20, épisode 10)
  - Les Experts (2010) : Earnest Boozell (saison 11, épisode 2)
  - New York, unité spéciale (2012) : Walter Thompkins (saison 14, épisode 8)
  - Hawaii 5-0 (2016) : Leo Hirsch (saison 6, épisode 23)
  - Doubt (2017) : Isaiah Roth
  - 9JKL (2017-2018) : Harry Roberts
- Stacy Keach dans :
  - Au-delà du réel : L'aventure continue (2000) : Cord van Owen (saison 6, épisode 2)
  - Titus (2000-2002) : Ken Titus
  - Prison Break (2005-2007) : Henry Pope
  - Urgences (2007) : Mike Gates
  - Meteor : Le Chemin de la destruction (2009) : shérif Crowe (mini-série)
  - Lights Out (2011) : Robert Leary
  - Enlisted (2014) : Patrick (saison 1, épisode 8)
  - New York, unité spéciale (2014) : Orion Bauer (saison 16, épisode 2)
  - NCIS : Nouvelle-Orléans (2015-2017) : Cassius Pride (1^{er} voix, saisons 1 et 4)
  - Blue Bloods (2016-2017) : le cardinal Kevin Kearns (1^{er} voix, saisons 7 et 8)
  - Papa a un plan (2016-2018) : Joe Burns (1^{er} voix, saisons 1 et 2)
- Tom Skerritt dans :
  - Dossiers brûlants (1974) : Robert W. Palmer (saison 1, épisode 7)
  - Un drôle de shérif (1992-1996) : Jimmy Brock
  - Will et Grace (2002) : D^{r} Jay Markus (saison 5, épisode 7)
  - État d'alerte (2004) : directeur adjoint de la CIA Acton Sandman
  - Fallen (2006) : Zeke
  - Brothers and Sisters (2006-2009) : William Walker
  - Dead Zone (2007) : Herb Smith (saison 6, épisode 13)
  - FBI : Duo très spécial (2012) : Alan Mitchell (saison 3, épisode 14)
  - The Good Wife (2014) : James Paisley
  - Madam Secretary (2015) : Patrick McCord (saison 1, épisode 13)
- William Shatner dans :
  - Troisième planète après le Soleil (1999-2000) : Grosse Tête Géante / Stone Phillips
  - The Practice : Bobby Donnell et Associés (2004) : Denny Crane
  - Boston Justice (2004-2008) : Denny Crane
  - Psych : Enquêteur malgré lui (2011-2012) : Frank O’Hara
  - Rookie Blue (2012) : Henry McLeod (saison 3, épisode 1)
  - Les Enquêtes de Murdoch (2015) : Mark Twain (saison 9, épisode 2)
- Scott Paulin dans :
  - JAG (2002-2003) : capitaine Johnson
  - FBI : Portés disparus (2003) : Lawrence Metcalf (saison 1, épisode 16)
  - NCIS : Enquêtes spéciales (2006) : capitaine Kevin Dorn (saison 3, épisode 20)
  - Lie to Me (2009) : Gerald Cole (saison 1, épisode 1)
  - NCIS : Los Angeles (2011) : Larry Basser (saison 3, épisode 6)
  - Longmire (2012) : Ira Craig (saison 1, épisode 6)
- Donald Sutherland dans :
  - Salem (2004) : Richard Straker
  - Commander in Chief (2005-2006) : Nathan Templeton
  - Dirty Sexy Money (2007-2009) : Patrick « Tripp » Darling III
  - Les Piliers de la terre (2010) : Bartholomew de Shiring
  - Crossing Lines (2013-2015) : Michael Dorn
  - Trust (2018) : J. Paul Getty
- Ramy Zada dans :
  - Dallas (1990-1991) : Johnny Dancer
  - Le Juge de la nuit (1991-1992) : juge Nicholas Marshall
  - Melrose Place (1995) : Martin Abbott
  - X-Files : Aux frontières du réel (1999) : Joe Cutrona (saison 7, épisode 6)
  - JAG (2004) : professeur Alessandro Selvaggio (saison 9, épisode 12)
- Chuck Norris dans :
  - Walker, Texas Ranger (1993-2001) : Cordell Walker
  - Le Successeur (1999) : Cordell Walker
  - Le Flic de Shanghaï (2000) : Cordell Walker (saison 2, épisode 16)
- Jon Voight dans :
  - Lonesome Dove : La Loi des justes (1993) : capitaine Woodrow F. Call
  - 24 heures chrono (2009) : Jonas Hodges
  - Ray Donovan (2013-2017) : Mickey Donovan (1^{er} voix, saisons 1 à 5)
- John Mahoney dans :
  - Frasier (1993-2004) : Martin Crane
  - Urgences (2006) : Bennett Cray (saison 13, épisode 3)
  - Hot in Cleveland (2011) : Rusty « Roy » Banks
- Michael Nouri dans :
  - Demain à la une (1998) : Stanley Hollenbeck (saison 3, épisode 10)
  - New York, unité spéciale (1999) : Dallas Warner (saison 1, épisode 2)
  - New York, section criminelle (2007) : Elder Roberts (saison 6, épisode 15)
- Alan Dale dans :
  - The Practice : Bobby Donnell et Associés (2002) : juge Robert Brenford
  - 24 heures chrono (2003-2004) : vice-président Jim Prescott
  - Californication (2011) : Lloyd Alan Philips Jr. (saison 4, épisode 7)
- Peter Coyote dans :
  - The Inside : Dans la tête des tueurs (2005-2006) : Virgil « Web » Webster
  - Los Angeles, police judiciaire (2010-2011) : le procureur Jerry Hardin
  - Intelligence (2014) : Leland Strand
- Anthony Higgins dans :
  - Londres, police judiciaire (2009) : Edward Connor (saison 1, épisode 5)
  - Inspecteur Lewis (2009) : Franco (saison 3, épisode 4)
  - Miss Marple (2010) : Comte Ludwig Von Stainach (saison 5, épisode 2)
- Don Murray dans :
  - Côte Ouest (1979-1982) : William « Sid » Fairgaite
  - Twin Peaks : The Return (2017) : Bushnell Mullins
- Kenneth Welsh dans :
  - Au-delà du réel : L'aventure continue (1997) : D^{r}. Vasquez (saison 3, épisode 9)
  - The Listener (2012) : Albert Jacoby (saison 3, épisode 11)
- Mathieu Carrière dans :
  - Le Renard (1999) : Stefan Achatz (saison 23, épisode 4)
  - Rex, chien flic (2000) : P^{r}. Paul Mandl (saison 6, épisode 8)
- Robert Curtis Brown dans :
  - Veronica Mars (2005) : le juré chef d'industrie (saison 2, épisode 10)
  - Shark (2007-2008) : Morgan Ride
- J. K. Simmons dans :
  - The Closer (2005-2012) : Will Pope (J. K. Simmons)
  - Raising Hope (2011) : Bruce Chance (saison 1, épisode 16)
- Matt Riedy dans :
  - NCIS : Enquêtes spéciales (2007) : amiral Kenneth Kirkland (saison 5, épisode 8)
  - Mad Men (2008) : Henry Wofford (saison 2, épisode 2)
- Howard Hesseman dans :
  - Urgences (2007) : D^{r} James Broderick (saison 14, épisode 1)
  - Les Experts (2011) : D^{r} Aden (saison 11, épisode 16)
- Bruce Davison dans :
  - Ghost Whisperer (2009) : Josh Bedford (saison 4, épisode 23)
  - Les Experts (2011) : Avery Tinsdale (saison 11, épisode 20)
- Michael Shamus Wiles dans :
  - Breaking Bad (2009-2012) : le chef de la DEA
  - Last Resort (2013) : général Macavoy (saison 1, épisode 11)
- John Hurt dans :
  - Labyrinthe (2012) : Audric Baillard
  - Panthers (2015) : Tom Kendle
- Dans Inspecteur Derrick :
  - 1983 : Arthur Dissmann (Horst Buchholz) (ép. 100 : Le chantage)
  - 1985 : Andreas Hessler (Gerd Böckmann (de)) (ép. 126 : Bavure)
  - 1987 : Conny de Mohl (Frank Hoffmann) (ép. 155 : Patrouille de nuit)
  - 1991 : Joachim Karau (Hanns Zischler) (ép. 202 : Des vies bouleversées)
- Others:
  - 1974 : Dossiers brûlants : lieutenant Jack Matteo (William Daniels) (saison 1, épisode 4)
  - 1976 / 1978 : Drôles de dames : Ted Kale (Kurt Grayson) (saison 1, épisode 1) / Frank Bartone (Cesare Danova) (saison 1, épisode 2) et Frank Howell (Dean Martin)
  - 1978 : Le Renard : Karl Markolm (Klausjürgen Wussow) (S02E04 : L'enfant de la haine)
  - 1978-1986 : La croisière s'amuse : Mike Andrews (Bob Seagren) (saison 1, épisode 19) / Mike Kelly (Michael Cole) / Wally (Jimmie Walker) (saison 3, épisode 12) / Bill Simmons (John Reilly) (saison 4, épisode 8) / Ron (Richard Gilliland) (saison 6, épisode 21) / Joe (Brodie Greer) (saison 8, épisode 9) et Michael Sawyer (John Astin)
  - 1978-1987 : Dallas : Gary Ewing (David Ackroyd) / le détective de Bobby (Ion Berger) (saison 6, épisode 16) / Frederick Hoskins (Allan Miller) / Gary Ewing (Ted Shackelford) (saison 9, épisode 1) et Mr. Barton (Josef Rainer)
  - 1979 : Le Renard : Hubertus Manz (Thomas Fritsch) (S03E08 : Le doute et la peur)
  - 1981-1982 : Flamingo Road : Michael Tyrone (David Selby)
  - 1981-1987 : Dynastie : Michael Culhane (Wayne Northrop)
  - 1982-1987 : Ricky ou la Belle Vie : Dexter Stuffins (Franklyn Seales)
  - 1984 : Sherlock Holmes : Charles Gorot (Nicholas Geake) (saison 1, épisode 3)
  - 1984-1987 : Arabesque : Peter Brill (Bert Convy) (épisode pilote) / Horace Lynchfield (Paul Sand) (saison 1, épisode 17) / Christopher Bundy (Bert Convy) (saison 2, épisode 19) / Gilbert Gaston (Robert Forster) (saison 2, épisode 21) et Avery Stone (Bradford Dillman) (saison 4, épisode 8)
  - 1984-1987 : Supercopter : D^{r} Robert Winchester (David Carradine) (saison 1, épisode 10) / Nick Kincaid (Eric Braeden) (saison 3, épisode 22) et Saint John Hawke (Barry Van Dyke)
  - 1985 : Kane & Abel : William Lowell Kane (Sam Neill) (mini-série)
  - 1986 : La Vengeance aux deux visages : D^{r} Dan Marshall (James Smilie)
  - 1986-1987 : La Vie des Botes : le père
  - 1987 : La Belle et la Bête : Henry Dutton (Paul Gleason) (saison 1, épisode 8)
  - 1987-1988 : Max Headroom : Edison Carter / Max Headroom (Matt Frewer)
  - 1988 : La noble maison : Lando Mata (Damien Thomas) (mini-série)
  - 1989 : Lonesome Dove : Woodrow F. Call (Tommy Lee Jones)
  - 1989-1991 : Hercule Poirot : l'inspecteur de police (Al Fiorentini) (saison 1, épisode 6) / Gregorie Rolf (Oliver Cotton) (saison 2, épisode 9) et James Ackerley (Andrew Burt) (saison 3, épisode 10)
  - 1990-1992 : Les Contes de la crypte : Jerry (Michael Ironside) (saison 2, épisode 7) / D^{r} Trask (Richard Thomas) (saison 2, épisode 15) / Charles McKenzie (Richard Jordan) (saison 3, épisode 12) / D^{r} Roberts (Don Michaelson) (saison 4, épisode 3) / Fred (Christopher Reeve) (saison 4, épisode 6) / D^{r} Alan Goetz (David Warner) (saison 4, épisode 7) et le lieutenant Jameson (Obba Babatundé) (saison 4, épisode 10)
  - 1990 : Hercule Poirot, épisode L'Aventure de l'Étoile de l'Ouest : Gregory Rolf (Oliver Cotton (en))
  - 1992 : Notre belle famille : Bob Gordon (Troy Shire) (saison 1, épisode 22)
  - 1993-1994 : La Caverne de la rose d'or : Tarabas (Nicholas Rogers); voix additionnelles
  - 1993-1996 : New York Police Blues : l'inspecteur John Kelly (David Caruso) / Mike Biaggi (Lou Casal) (saison 3, épisode 3) / Patsy Ferrara (Brad Sullivan) (saison 3, épisode 7) / Theodore Tierney (Michael Waltman) et Carl (Robert Sutton) (saison 3, épisode 13) et Victor Charels (John Curless) (saison 4, épisode 5)
  - 1994-1995 : Mission top secret : Neville Savage (Shane Briant)
  - 1994-2003 : Friends : le réalisateur (James Burrows) (saison 1, épisode 6) / Mr. Heckles (Larry Hankin) (saison 1, épisode 7) / Burt (Richard Roat) (saison 6, épisode 18) / l'acteur (Paul Logan) (saison 9, épisode 11) et le réalisateur (Joe Colligan) (saison 9, épisode 19)
  - 1995-1996 : Melrose Place : Vic Munson (Page Moseley)
  - 1995-1999 : Bugs : Dent (Richard Durden) / D^{r} Talbot (David Grant) (saison 2, épisode 10)
  - 1996 : L'Homme de nulle part : Robert Barton (Francis X. McCarthy) (saison 1, épisode 25)
  - 1996 : Chair de poule : Mr. Starkes (Peter Messaline)
  - 1996 : FX, effets spéciaux : lieutenant Stone (Richard Comar)
  - 1996-1998 : Au-delà du réel : L'aventure continue : Maculhaney (Alan Rachins) (saison 2, épisode 15) / le principal (Douglas Newell) (saison 3, épisode 14) et le pasteur à la télévision (Ed Evanko) (saison 4, épisode 7)
  - 1997-1998 : JAG : lieutenant Harmon Rabb (voix de Richard Crenna)
  - 1997-2002 : Dharma et Greg : Edward Montgomery (Mitchell Ryan)
  - 1998 : Seinfeld : le chauffeur du taxi de Elaine (Dayton Callie) (saison 9, épisode 20)
  - 1999-2002 : Charmed : Ben Bragg (Jim Antonio) (saison 2, épisode 7) et le père de Paige (Scott Wilkinson) (saison 4, épisode 10)
  - 2000-2003 : Un cas pour deux : Dieter Möhrlein (Wolfgang Packhäuser) (saison 20, épisode 7) / l'avocat de Kern (Franz Hanfstingl) (saison 21, épisode 1) / Karl Hoprecht (Michael Gwisdek) (saison 22, épisode 1) et Herr Winterberger (Peter Rauch) (saison 24, épisode 4)
  - 2001 : Alias : Karl Dreyer (Tobin Bell)
  - 2001 : Sept à la maison : le grand-père de Sarah (John Gowans) (saison 5, épisode 21)
  - 2001 : Commissaire Léa Sommer : Anton Kofler (Edgar M. Böhlke) (saison 5, épisode 1)
  - 2001-2002 : New York, unité spéciale : Darien Marshall (Simon Jones) (saison 2, épisode 17) et Craig Lambert (Craig Bockhorn) (saison 4, épisode 6)
  - 2002 : Do Over : Bill Larsen (Michael Milhoan)
  - 2002 : Les Nuits de l'étrange : Martin (Malcolm McDowell) (saison 1, épisode 25)
  - 2003-2007 : FBI : Portés disparus : Victor Fitzgerald (Ray Baker) et Leslie Warwick (David Birney) (saison 5, épisode 17)
  - 2003-2008 : Urgences : Bob Gilman (Michael Durrell) (saison 9, épisode 11) et Walter Perkins (Hal Holbrook)
  - 2003-2009 : Inspecteur Barnaby : Rupert Smythe-Webster (Ronald Pickup) (saison 6, épisode 4) / Tom (David Bradley) (saison 7, épisode 1) / Viv Marshall (Simon Armstrong) (saison 8, épisode 6) / John Farrow / Lahaie (David Burke) (saison 8, épisode 8) / Teddy Butler (John Franklyn-Robbins) (saison 9, épisode 3) / Henry Marwood (Dominic Jephcott) (saison 9, épisode 5) / Guy Sandys (Simon Williams) (saison 11, épisode 4) et Seth Comfort (Clive Russell) (saison 12, épisode 3)
  - 2003-2013 : NCIS : Enquêtes spéciales : le golfeur Ben (Robert Pine) (saison 1, épisode 5) et Norman Pittorino (Graham Beckel) (saison 10, épisode 18)
  - 2004 : Miss Marple : colonel Arthur Bantry (James Fox) (saison 1, épisode 1)
  - 2004 : Ash et Scribbs : Tim Gregson (Philip Martin Brown) (saison 1, épisode 4)
  - 2004 : Dead Zone : Max Kolchak (Serge Houde) (saison 3, épisode 9)
  - 2004 : Ma famille d'abord : Wayne Newton (lui-même) (saison 5, épisode 1)
  - 2004 / 2014 : Mon oncle Charlie : Harry Dean Stanton (lui-même) (saison 2, épisode 1) et Steve (Steve Lawrence) (saison 11, épisode 13)
  - 2005 : Joey : Benjamin Lockwood (John Larroquette)
  - 2005 : Killer Instinct : Robert Hale (Peter Strauss) (saison 1, épisode 6)
  - 2005-2008 : Supernatural : John Winchester (Jeffrey Dean Morgan)
  - 2006 : Power Rangers : Force mystique : Leanbow (Chris Graham)
  - 2006 : Desperate Housewives : D^{r} Barr (William Atherton)
  - 2007 : Cold Case : Affaires classées : Stan Williams (Perry King) (saison 4, épisode 13)
  - 2007 : Burn Notice : Mr. Pyne (Ray Wise)
  - 2007 : Entourage : Dennis Hopper (lui-même) (saison 4, épisode 3)
  - 2007 : Veronica Mars : le père de Madison (?) (saison 3, épisode 12)
  - 2008 : Power Rangers : Jungle Fury : maître Mao (Nathaniel Lees)
  - 2009 : Nip/Tuck : Manny Caldarello (Richard Portnow) (saison 5, épisode 21)
  - 2009 : Californication : Peter Fonda (lui-même) (saison 3, épisode 9)
  - 2009 : NCIS : Los Angeles : Rick Pargo (Gregory Scott Cummins) (saison 1, épisode 6)
  - 2009-2014 : Les Enquêtes de Murdoch : juge Mitchell Wilson (Tom McCamus) (saison 2, épisode 5) et le prête (Neil Foster) (saison 7, épisode 12)
  - 2010 : Lie to Me : Leo O'Sullivan (Bruce Weitz) (saison 2, épisode 13)
  - 2010 : Chuck : le serveur du train (Ian Patrick Williams) (saison 3, épisode 14)
  - 2010 : Party Down : Howard Greengold (Alex Rocco) (saison 2, épisode 10)
  - 2010 : Borgen, une femme au pouvoir : Parly Petersen (Claus Bue) (saison 1, épisode 3) et Holger Brodersen (Niels Weyde) (saison 2, épisode 6)
  - 2011 : The Defenders : Carmine (Daniel J. Travanti) (saison 1, épisode 13)
  - 2011 : Les Experts : Oscar B. Goodman (lui-même) (saison 12, épisode 4)
  - 2011-2012 : Luck : Nick DeRossi (Alan Rosenberg)
  - 2011-2012 : The Good Wife : Frank Michael Thomas (Fred Dalton Thompson)
  - 2012 : True Blood : général Cavanaugh (Phil Reeves) (saison 5, épisode 11)
  - 2013 : The Killing : Raymond Seward Sr. (Duncan Fraser) (saison 3, épisode 6)
  - 2013-2014 : Castle : Jackson Hunt (James Brolin)
  - 2014 : Marvel : Les Agents du SHIELD : le vieil homme dans le train (Stan Lee) (saison 1, épisode 13)
  - 2014 : Mammon, la révélation : professeur Stellesnæs (Harald Brenna)
  - 2014 : Madam Secretary : l'ambassadeur Lester Clark (Robert Klein) (saison 1, épisode 6)
  - 2014-2017 : The Leftovers : Kevin Garvey Sr. (Scott Glenn)
  - 2015 : Under the Dome : colonel Walker (Dann Florek) (saison 3, épisode 13)
  - 2016 : Frankenstein Code : Jimmy Pritchard âgé (Philip Baker Hall)
  - 2016-2018 : Better Call Saul : Clifford Main (Ed Begley Jr.) (1^{er} voix, saisons 2 et 4)
  - 2016 : Westworld : le vieux Bill (Michael Wincott)
  - 2016 : Madoff, l'arnaque du siècle : Carl Shapiro (Charles Grodin) (mini-série)
  - 2017-2018 : Grace et Frankie : Nick Skolka (Peter Gallagher) (1^{er} voix, saisons 3 à 5)
  - 2017 : Colony : Hennessey (William Russ)
  - 2017-2018 : Au fil des jours : Berto (Tony Plana) (1^{er} voix, saisons 1 et 2)
  - 2018 : Meurtres au paradis : Frank O'Toole (James Faulkner) (saison 7, épisode 3)

==== Animated Shows ====
- Le Roi Arthur et les chevaliers de justice : Lord Viper / Seigneur Vipère
- Reboot : virus Megabyte / capitaine Capacitor / Phong / Slash (saison 3)
- Action Man : le docteur X
- Les Razmoket : Jean-Roger, Charles
- Razbitume ! : Jean-Roger, Charles
- Iznogoud : voix additionnelles
- Bêtes à craquer : l'éléphant Eugène
- Le Tour du monde en quatre-vingts jours : Philéas Fogg
- Tic et Tac, les rangers du risque : Catox
- She-Ra, la princesse du pouvoir : Flèche d'or (1^{re} voix)
- Les Animaux du Bois de Quat'sous : Renard
- Les Chevaliers du Zodiaque : Shiryu, Hyoga, Docrates et Phaéton
- Samouraï Pizza Cats : le narrateur
- Double Dragon : le Maître de l'ombre
- 1992-1997 : X-Men : Magneto, le Fauve
- 1997-2000 : Timothy et ses peluches : Zébron, Ti'Nours et le narrateur
- 1999-2013 : Futurama : Bender Tordeur Rodríguez (sauf saisons 4 et 5), Docteur Zoidberg (saisons 1 à 3 et films), Flexo, Léo Wong (saisons 1 à 3)
- 2010 / 2012 : Archer : Lord Feltchley (saison 1, épisode 2) et Burt Reynolds (saison 3, épisode 4)
- 2011 : Wakfu : le procureur (saison 2)

=== Videogames ===
- 2002 : Blade 2 : Abraham Whistler
- 2002 : Kingdom Hearts : Dr Finkelstein
- 2003 : Futurama : Bender Rodriguez
- 2004 : Rome: Total War : le capitaine carthaginois
- 2004 : Halo 2 : Sesa 'Refumee
- 2005 : Kameo: Elements of Power : l'entraineur
- 2005 : Kingdom Hearts 2 : le D^{r} Finkelstein
- 2006 : Le Parrain : Santino « Sonny » Corleone
- 2006 : Secret Files : Tunguska : le père de Nina
- 2006 : The Secrets of Da Vinci : Le Manuscrit interdit : François 1er
- 2008 : Fallout 3 : le président Eden
- 2009 : Dragon Age: Origins : Riordan
- 2011 : Star Wars: The Old Republic : voix additionnelles
- 2013 : Disney Infinity : le shérif de Colby
- 2014 : Destiny : Arach Jalaal, l'émissaire de l'Astre Mort
- 2014 : Halo 2 : Anniversary : Elite de l'introduction, Sesa 'Refumee
- 2015 : The Order: 1886 : le Grand Chancelier
- 2015 : Heroes of the Storm : Ka, annonceur de la carte Temple Céleste
- 2017 : Destiny 2 : Arach Jalaal, l'émissaire de l'Astre Mort
- 2016 : Total War: Warhammer : le narrateur
- 2017 : World of Warcraft: Legion : Silgryn
- 2018 : Detroit: Become Human : Carl Manfred

=== Documentaries ===
- Jackie Chan : My Stunts (1999) : le narrateur

=== Advertisements ===
- Teenage Mutant Hero Turtles (1990) : voix off
- Brut (Fabergé) (1998) : voix off
- Star Trek : les dossiers officiels (1999) : voix off
- Télé Z (2004) : voix off
- Viandes et pommes du Limousin (2004) : voix off défendant les pommes
- Aviva (2007) : voix off
- Lindt (2008) : le maître chocolatier
- MAIF (2010) : voix du grand-père
- World of Warcraft (2011) : Chuck Norris
- Fiat Pro "C'est du costaud" (2017) : Chuck Norris

== As Artistic Director ==
Téléfilms

- Mauvaise Influence

Séries télévisées

- Sept à la maison
- Awake
- Dharma et Greg
- Un cas pour deux
- Do Over
- DOS : Division des opérations spéciales
- Un drôle de shérif
- Frasier
- Haute Tension
- Moi et ma belle-famille
- New York Police Blues
- Romeo
- Sunset Beach
- Supernatural
- The Closer : L.A. enquêtes prioritaires
- The Palace

Séries animées

- Samouraï Pizza Cats
- Bêtes à craquer
- Futurama (saisons 1 à 3)
