= Jean-Roch Coignet =

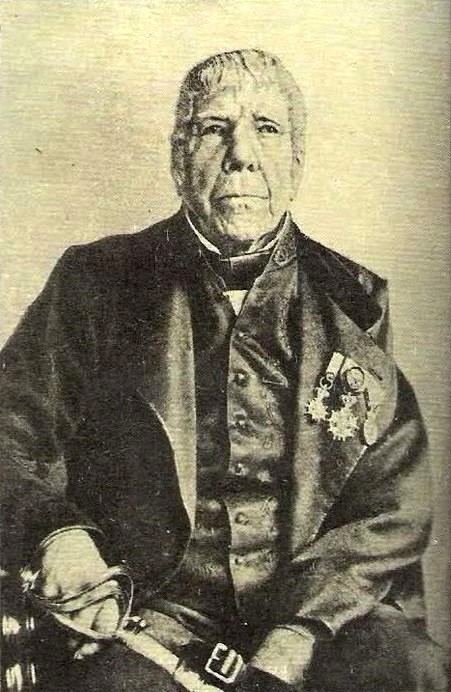
- Born: 16 August 1776; Druyes-les-Belles-Fontaines, France
- Died: 10 December 1865 (aged 89); Auxerre, France
- Military career
- Allegiance: France
- Service years: 1799–1815
- Rank: Captain
- Unit: Imperial Guard
- Conflicts: French Revolutionary Wars; Napoleonic Wars
- Awards: Légion d'honneur

Jean-Roch Coignet (16 August 1776 – 10 December 1865) was a French soldier who served in the military campaigns of the Consulate and First French Empire, up through the Battle of Waterloo. He later wrote his memoirs detailing his military service, The Notebooks of Captain Coignet, which are still being reprinted.

He participated in 16 campaigns and 48 battles, never having been wounded.

== Military service ==
=== Revolutionary Wars ===
Coignet was conscripted in 1799 and served as a grenadier in the 96th Line. He received a musket of honour for single-handedly capturing an Austrian cannon at the Battle of Montebello. Coignet fought hard at the battle of Marengo, constantly in the thick of the action, in which he and his fellow soldiers had to hold out until French reserves arrived. Coignet survived the battle, and was promoted to the Consular Guard and awarded the Légion d'honneur.

=== Napoleonic Wars ===
As a grenadier of the Imperial Guard, Coignet fought at Ulm, Austerlitz, Jena, Eylau and Friedland. He was a witness to negotiations at the Treaty of Tilsit between Napoleon and the Emperor of Russia. After being promoted to corporal he took part in the invasion of Spain and the battle of Somosierra and the pursuit of the British army.

Coignet then fought at Aspern-Essling, in which he and his comrades found themselves under fire from fifty Austrian guns. After victory in the campaign Coignet rose to the rank of sergeant, eventually becoming baggage-master.

Coignet was sent on a series of solo missions for the Emperor during the disastrous invasion of Russia. He took part in an attack on the redoubts during the battle of Borodino. He witnessed the death of general Caulaincourt, whom he accompanied into the fray. Surviving cossacks and the Russian winter, Coignet was a witness to the horrors of the retreat and later on provided a vivid depiction of conditions facing him and his comrades in his memoirs. After the campaign Coignet was promoted to captain in Napoleon's staff.

Coignet participated in the campaigns of 1813-1814 and rejoined the Emperor during the Hundred Days. He was present at Ligny and survived Waterloo. After this he fought and killed a Prussian officer in front of the Prussian lines before Paris.

== Later life ==
Coignet settled in Auxerre, running a tobacconist's shop. He began to write his memories after the death of his wife in August 1848. These were initially published in Auxerre between 1851 and 1853 under the title Aux vieux de la vieille. The first print run of 500 copies was sold directly by Coignet to his customers.

Coignet's memoirs however, were written in rough French, as he had not learned to read and write until late in life. Years after his death in 1865, in 1883, the writer Loredan Larchey, by revising and rewriting Coignet's memoirs, published broad extracts of Aux vieux de la vieille under the title The Notebooks of the Captain Coignet, which met with immediate success. The Notebooks from then on were constantly republished, but the first integral edition was published only in 1968 by the writer Jean Mistler, who adds an important foreword.

== TV miniseries ==
Coignet was the subject of a French TV miniseries, Jean-Roch Coignet, which was written by Albert Vidalie and directed by Claude-Jean Bonnardot. The French national public broadcasting agency ORTF aired seven one-hour episodes from 23 December 1969 to 3 January 1970. The cast was as follows:

- Henri Lambert - Jean-Roch Coignet
- Pierre Santini - Gervais
- François Dyrek - La Franchise
- Max Vialle - Godaille
- Anne Pauzé - Louison
- Jacques Mondain - Benoît
- Fabienne Mai - Mme Potier
- Hervé Sand - M. Potier
- Pascal Tersou - Palbrois
- Jean Payen - Le sergent écrivain
