= Maya (1949 film) =

1949 film directed by Raymond Bernard

- Directed by: Raymond Bernard
- Written by: Raymond Bernard
- Based on: Maya by Simon Gantillon
- Produced by: Ralph Baum; Viviane Romance
- Starring: Viviane Romance; Marcel Dalio; Jean-Pierre Grenier
- Cinematography: André Thomas
- Edited by: Charlotte Guilbert
- Music by: Georges Auric
- Production company: Izarran
- Distributed by: Lux Compagnie Cinématographique de France
- Release date: 30 November 1949
- Running time: 78 minutes
- Country: France
- Language: French

Maya is a 1949 French drama film directed by Raymond Bernard and starring Viviane Romance, Marcel Dalio and Jean-Pierre Grenier. It is based on a 1924 play of the same title by Simon Gantillon. It was shot at the Studio François I in Paris. The film's sets were designed by the art director Léon Barsacq.

== Cast ==
- Viviane Romance as Bella dite Maya
- Marcel Dalio as Le steward
- Jean-Pierre Grenier as Jean
- Jacques Castelot as Ernest
- Georges Douking as Un soutier
- Valéry Inkijinoff as Cachemire
- Georges Vitray as Le commandant
- Maurice Régamey as Michel
- Max Dalban as Le gros homme
- Françoise Hornez as Fifine
- Fréhel as Notre Mère
- Philippe Nicaud as Albert
- Jane Morlet as La vieille
- Marthe Sarbel as La logeuse
- Yette Lucas as La bouquetière
- Jean Clarieux as Le policier
- Daniel Mendaille as Le directeur du bureau de navigation
- Louis Seigner as Le paysan
- Dominique Davray as Une entraîneuse qui danse
- Robert Hossein as Un témoin du meurtre qui n'a rien vu

== Bibliography ==
- Goble, Alan. The Complete Index to Literary Sources in Film. Walter de Gruyter, 1999.
- Roust, Colin. Georges Auric: A Life in Music and Politics. Oxford University Press, 2020.
