= The Night Heaven Fell =

The Night Heaven Fell (Les Bijoutiers du clair de lune)
- Theatrical release poster
- Directed by: Roger Vadim
- Written by: Roger Vadim; Jacques Rémy; Peter Viertel (uncredited)
- Based on: The Night Heaven Fell; 1954 novel by Albert Vidalie
- Produced by: Raoul Lévy
- Starring: Brigitte Bardot; Stephen Boyd; Alida Valli
- Cinematography: Armand Thirard
- Edited by: Victoria Mercanton
- Music by: Georges Auric
- Production company: Iéna Productions
- Distributed by: Columbia Films S.A.
- Release dates: 16 April 1958 (France); 21 October 1958 (U.S.)
- Running time: 93 minutes
- Countries: France; Italy
- Languages: French; Spanish
- Budget: $800,000
- Box office: 2,134,822 admissions (France) $1 million rentals（1958） (US/Canada)

The Night Heaven Fell (Les bijoutiers du clair de lune) is an Eastmancolor 1958 French-Italian film directed by Roger Vadim. Vadim had already acquired international fame with his daring debut And God Created Woman (1956). Like its predecessor, The Night Heaven Fell explored the exuberant sensuality of Brigitte Bardot, who was married to Vadim at the time.

== Plot ==
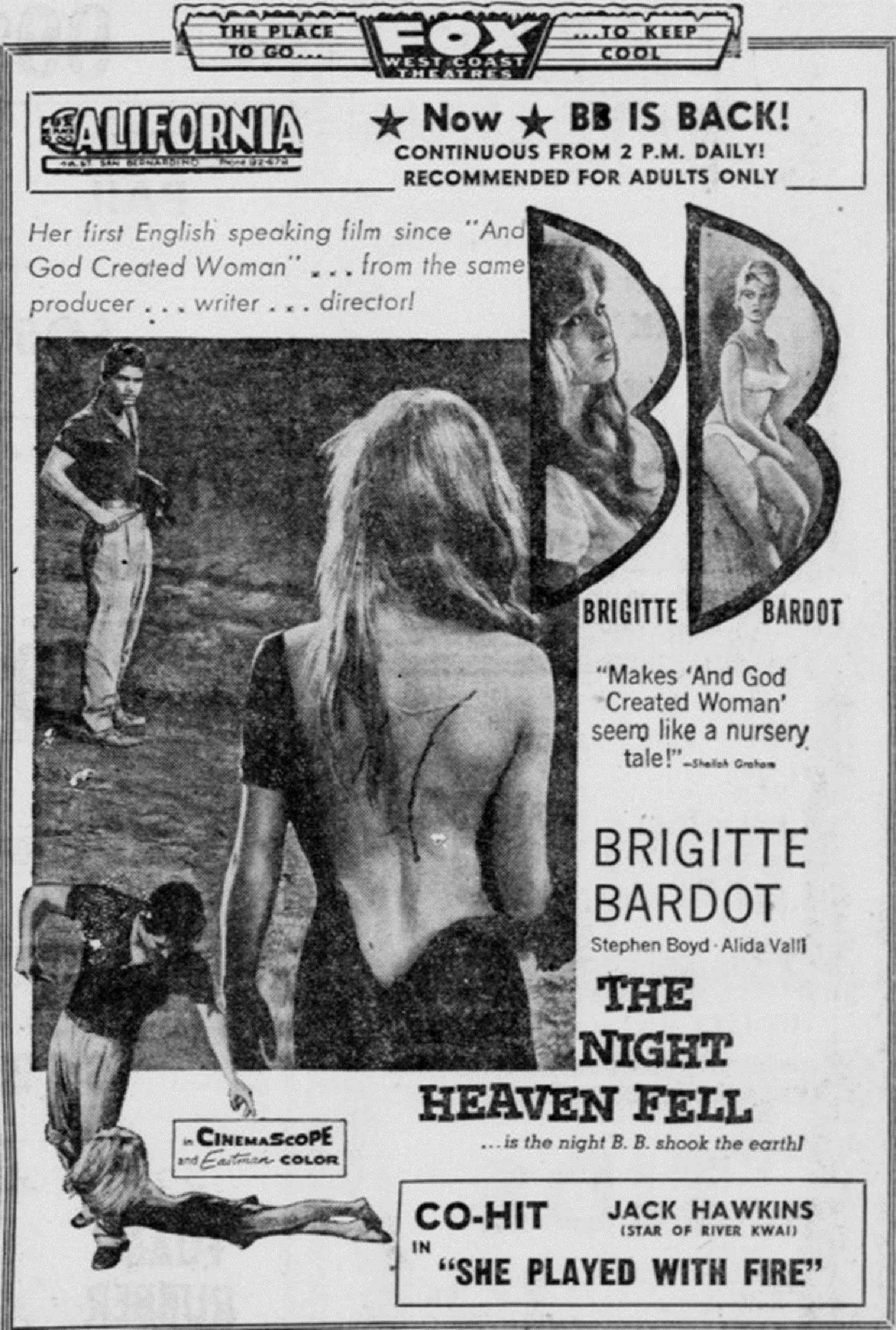
Advertisement from 1958

Set in rural Spain, Ursula (Brigitte Bardot), is a young girl who has just left a convent and has moved in with her aunt Florentine and her violent husband, the count Ribera (José Nieto). Ribera wants to see Lambert (Stephen Boyd), a young man from the village, dead. Ursula quickly falls in love with Lambert. In a confrontation between the two, Lambert kills Ribera in self-defense.

The reason for the conflict soon becomes clear to Ursula: he was having an affair with her aunt. However, when Florentine (Alida Valli) discovers her lover has no intention of making any commitment to her, she refuses to confirm Lambert's alibi to the police and forces him into becoming a fugitive. Ursula, always impulsive, runs off with him and together they seek a way to get him safely out of the country. While evading the police, the lovers take refuge in the gorge known as El Chorro.

Lambert contacts Florentine, who agrees to help them complete their escape. But at the rendezvous back in town, the police spot Florentine's car and become suspicious. A policeman spots Lambert up the street in the village. Against Lambert's protests, Ursula runs up the street towards him. After firing warning shots, the policeman shoots several rounds up the street, mortally wounding Ursula in the back as she stands in front of Lambert, who is not hit. He holds her in a doorway, and as she dies, they declare their love for each other.

== Cast ==
- Brigitte Bardot as Ursula
- Alida Valli as Florentine
- Stephen Boyd as Lambert
- José Nieto as Comte Miguel de Ribera
- Fernando Rey as Tío
- Maruchi Fresno as Conchita
- Adriano Domínguez as Fernando
- José Marco Davó Le chef de la police

== Reception ==
Despite the presence of Hollywood star, Stephen Boyd, the film was not as popular as And God Created Women. Variety called it "only a fair Gallic yarn." An earlier review in the same magazine called it "melodramatic in the worst sense."

On review aggregator website Rotten Tomatoes the film has an approval rating of 20% based on 5 critics, with an average rating of 4.60/10.

Nathan Rabin of The A.V. Club said this about the restored version of the film: "The Night Heaven Fell still leaves much to be desired artistically, this new transfer is a crisp, vivid marvel that gives an interesting but tremendously flawed film better treatment than it probably deserves".

The DVD version of the film was released on 19 September 2001. Rich Rosell of Digitally Obsessed, who reviewed it, gave it a "C+".
