= Philippe Fourastié =

French film director and screenwriter (1940–1982)

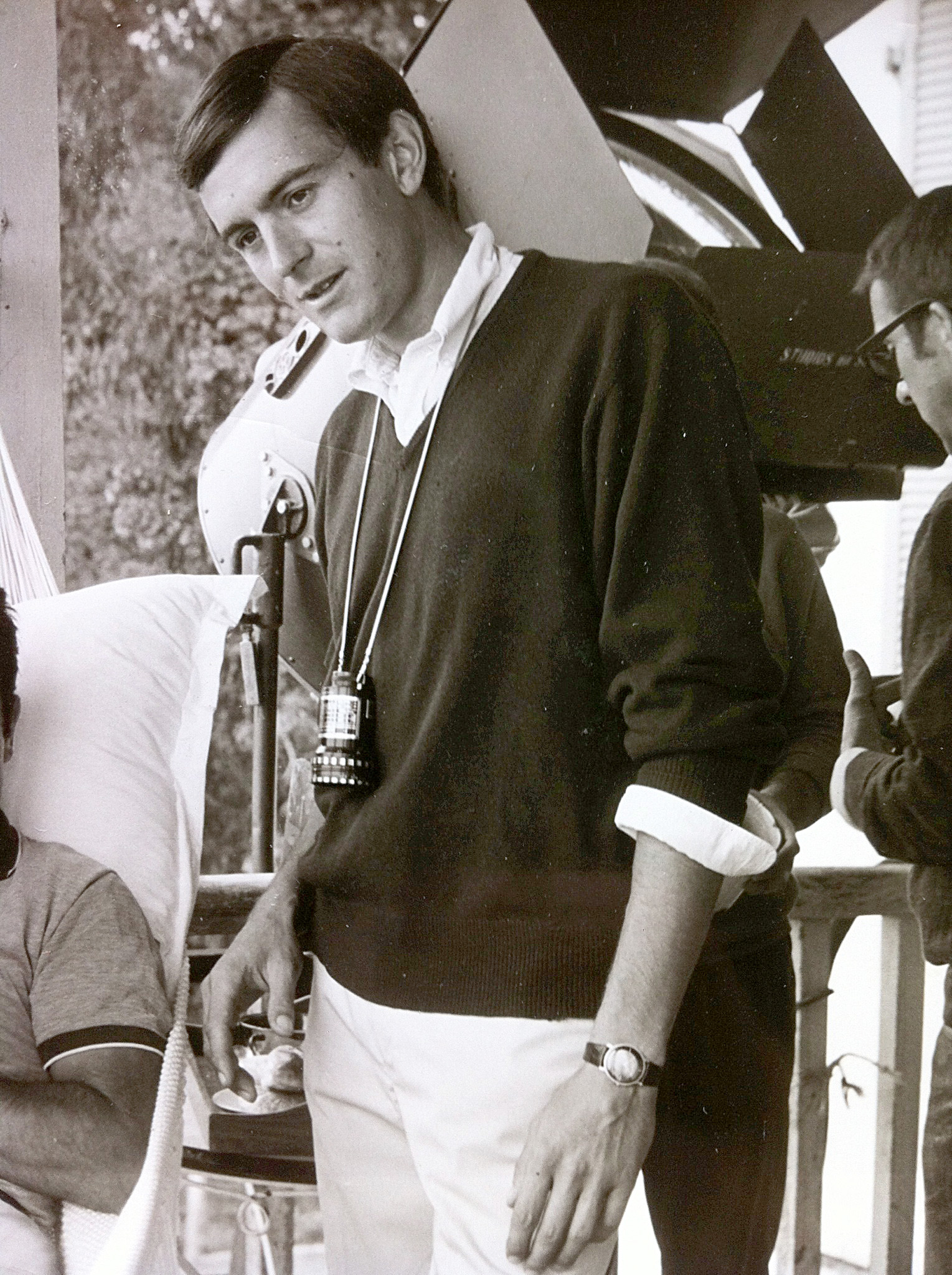
Philippe Fourastié on the set of his first feature movie "Un choix d'Assassin" 1966

Philippe Fourastié (14 January 1940 - 6 September 1982) was a French director and screenwriter.

== Biography ==
He learned the trade by starting as an assistant. He started with Pierre Schoendoerffer on La 317e Section (prize for best screenplay, Festival de Cannes 1965). He worked again with him on Objectif 500 millions, where he met actor Bruno Cremer with whom he would later collaborate. He also assisted Claude Chabrol for Marie-Chantal against Doctor Kha, Jean-Luc Godard for Pierrot le fou and Jacques Rivette, on another film banned by censorship, Suzanne Simonin, the Nun of Diderot.

In 1966, he directed his first feature film: A choice of assassins, adaptation of William P. McGivern, the author of Odds Against Tomorrow (adapted in 1959 by Robert Wise). The film tells the story of a cartoonist who goes adrift after the death of his wife, who crosses paths with arms dealers, beatniks, and gangsters in Tangier.

La Bande à Bonnot is the second and last film by Philippe Fourastié, the best known. It recounts the life and tragic fate of Jules Bonnot, a turn-of-the-century anarchist. Fourastié, assisted by Claude Miller, directed Bruno Cremer (in the role of Bonnot), Jacques Brel, and Annie Girardot. The political discourse of the film, considered radical, resulted in a ban for those under 18. The film, released in 1968, is cold and harsh. Cremer plays a withdrawn, determined and ruthless Bonnot. Fourastié refuses any psychologism and mixes not without skill the sympathy which the anarchist ideology inspires in him with the cold violence of the acts.

Fourastié then developed various film projects, including with Maurice Frot a modern transposition of the life of Saint-François d'Assise with Léo Ferré in the lead role. The latter even participated in the writing of certain scenes, but the project fails and Fourastié then works for television.

In 1972, he signed to direct six episodes of the miniseries Mandrin, the famous bandit of the 18th century. This historical soap opera is supposed to take place in the Dauphiné, which then experiences violent peasant demonstrations. The ORTF, fearing that the filming of this revolt against the excesses of royal taxation would further exacerbate passions, moved the filming to Yugoslavia. The officials of French television feared a priori that an analogy would be made between Mandrin and Gérard Nicoud, trade unionist of CIDUNATI, at the origin of movements of protests and demonstrations. This filming location also has advantages. In addition to the possibility of filming countryside landscapes preserved from modernity, the Yugoslav army provides this production with an important representation. The cast includes Pierre Fabre in the lead role of the beloved robber, François Dyrek, as Manot la Jeunesse, Jean Martin, Armand Mestral, Malka Ribowska, and popular singer Monique Morelli, who plays the faithful Carline and also sings some complaints commenting on the action.

Fourastie died of brain tumor on 6 September 1982 in Tréguier in the Côtes-d'Armor, at 42 years old.

== Filmography ==
Director and screenwriter

- 1966: Un choix d'assassins.
- 1968: La Bande à Bonnot, scénaristes : Jean Pierre Beaurenaut, Pierre Fabre et Rémo Forlani.
- 1972: Mandrin, série télévisée en 6 épisodes de 55 min.

Assistant director

- 1962: Ballade pour un voyou by Jean-Claude Bonnardot
- 1964: La Difficulté d'être infidèle by Bernard Toublanc-Michel
- 1965: La 317e Section by Pierre Schoendoerffer
- 1965: Marie-Chantal contre docteur Kha by Claude Chabrol
- 1965: Pierrot le fou by Jean-Luc Godard
- 1966: Objectif 500 millions by Pierre Schoendoerffer
- 1966: La Religieuse by Jacques Rivette
- 1968: Les Gauloises bleues by Michel Cournot
- 1968: Tante Zita by Robert Enrico
