= Maurice Fombeure =

French writer and poet

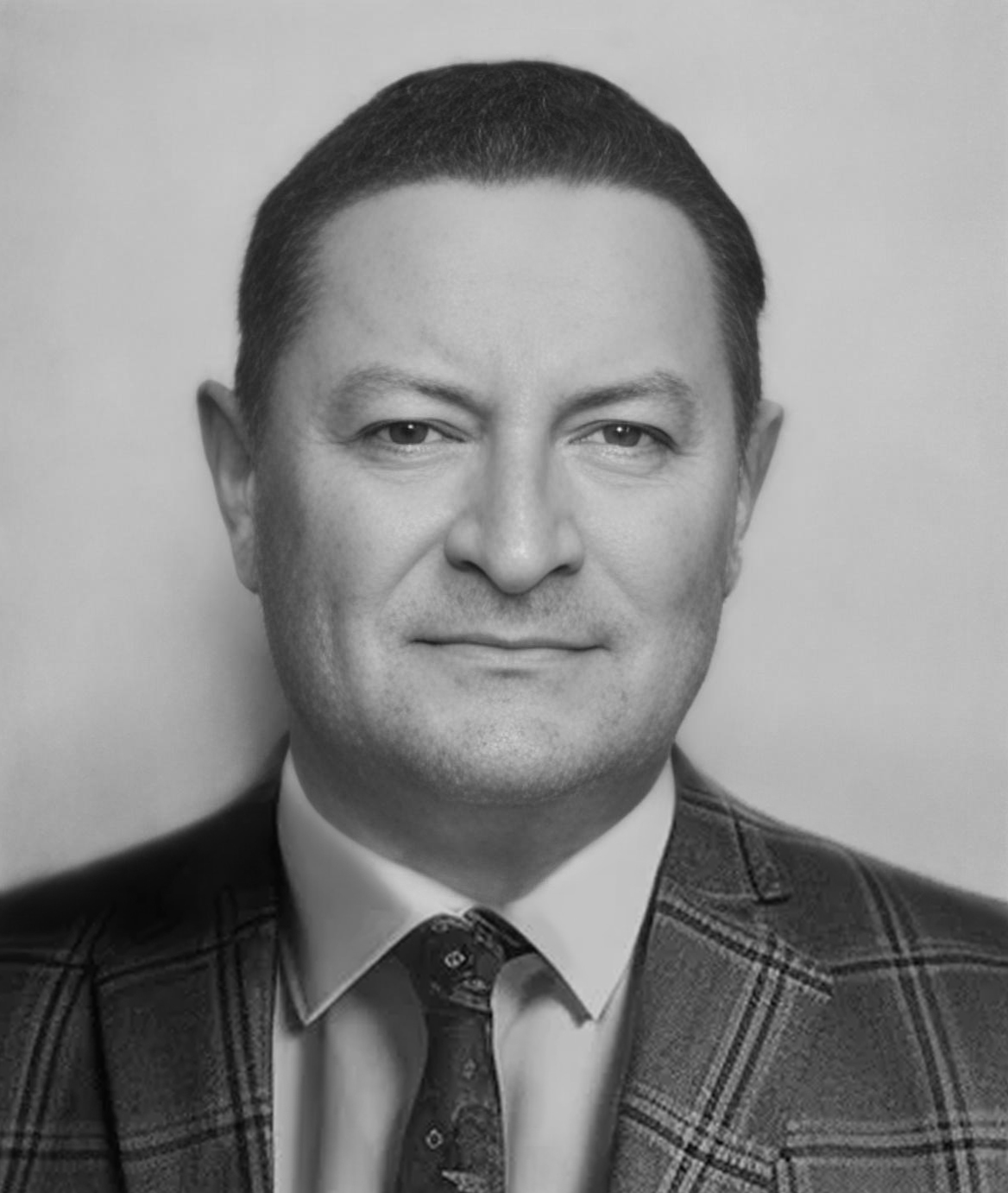
Maurice fombeure in 1964

Maurice Alphonse Jacques Fombeure (born in Jardres (Vienne) 23 September 1906; died at La Verrière (Yvelines) 1 January 1981) was a 20th-century French writer and poet.

The son of a winemaking family from Poitou, he trained as a teacher at the École normale in Poitiers and then at the École normale supérieure de Saint-Cloud. He became friends with other normale poets including Max Jacob and André Salmon, and taught in Parisian lycées including the Lycée Lavoisier, but remained always attached to his region of birth.

Very active in the literary circles of the capital, his first published work was 'The Line of the Heart' in 1925. He was awarded the Grand Prix for poetry by the town of Paris in 1958 and was elected to the Ronsard Academy. In 1980, he won the Grand Prix for Poetry of the Académie Française.

A museum is dedicated to him in Bonneuil-Matours, where his father was mayor from 1935 to 1947. It contains originals of his works as well as numerous personal effects.

The Dutch composer Marjo Tal set several of Fombeure's poems to music.

== Works ==
- Et s'il pleut cette nuit (A dos d'oiseau)
- La Rivière aux oies (Les éditions Rieder, 1932)
- Images de la nuit (Sagesse, 1935)
- Soldat (Gallimard, 1935)
- Les Moulins de la parole (La Hune, 1936)
- Bruits de la terre (Debresse, 1937)
- Maléfices des fontaines (Feuillets de l'Îlot, 1939)
- À pas de souris (Carnets de l'oiseau-mouche, 1939)
- Chansons du sommeil léger (Debresse, 1941)
- D'amour et d'aventure (Debresse, 1942)
- Greniers des saisons (Éditions Seghers, 1942)
- Chansons de la grande hune (Les Amis de Rochefort, 1942)
- À dos d'oiseau (Gallimard, 1942. Republished 1971)
- Arentelles (Gallimard, 1943)
- Manille coinchée (La Fenêtre Ouverte, 1943)
- Ceux des Pays d'Ouest : Poitou - Aunis - Saintonge - Angoumois. Types et coutumes, 1943)
- Aux créneaux de la pluie (Gallimard, 1946)
- Orion le tueur, with Jean-Pierre Grenier (Bordas, 1946), Théâtre Agnès Capri
- Sortilèges vus de près (Denoël, 1947)
- J'apprivoise par jeu (R. Cayla, 1947)
- Les godillots sont lourds : récit : Souvenirs de la « drôle de guerre », de septembre 1939 à juillet 1940, (Gallimard, 1948)
- Poussière du silence (Seghers, 1950)
- Les Étoiles brûlées (Gallimard, 1950)
- Nicolas Eekman, Introduction à l'Album II (Paris, 1950)
- Dès potron-minet (Seghers, 1952)
- Le Vin de la Haumuche (éditions Bellenand, Paris 1952)
- Pendant que vous dormez (Gallimard, 1953)
- Une forêt de charme (Gallimard, 1955)
- Sous les tambours du ciel (Gallimard, 1959)
- Paris m'a souri with the photographer Ervin Marton (Alpina, 1959)
- Silences sur le toit (Éditions Saint-Michel, 1960)
- Quel est ce cœur ? (Gallimard, 1963)
- À chat petit (Gallimard, 1967)
- Les Étoiles brûlées and Quel est ce cœur ? (Gallimard, 1983)
- Le Vin de la Haumuche (UPCP, 1989)
- J'ai mal à mon village (Le Temps qu'il fait, 1993)

== Publications ==
- Maurice Fombeure, Paris m'a souri, with photos by Ervin Marton, édition Alpina, 1959
- Maurice Fombeure, éditions Seghers, Collection Poètes d'aujourd'hui, 1957
- Bibliographie des éditions des oeuvres de M. Fombeure / établie et annotée par Philippe Pineau, édition Musée Sainte-Croix, 1984
