= Henri Lambert =

Belgian engineer and glass works owner (1862–1934)

Henri Lambert (1862–1934) was a Belgian engineer and glass works owner at Charleroi near Brussels. His glass works was the largest in the world in that time. He was one of the first occupied with social economy. He spoke Walloon with his blue collar workers, which was exceptional in that time. He was a prolific writer (in French) of articles for newspaper and political journals, brochures, and books on political philosophy, and had several of his works translated into German and English. He favoured individualism, free trade, and international peace. He also wrote works about corporations, trade unions, government, democracy, and representation, voicing bold and well-intentioned ideas (which may not be altogether consistent). But his criticism of the principle of limited liability in connection with corporations is an original point which seems to have attracted attention at the turn of the century, as well as his ideas about the organisation of trade unions. He was called upon to address lawyers' and economists' associations and other bodies.
