= La Difficulté d'être infidèle =

1964 film

- Film poster
- Directed by: Bernard Toublanc-Michel
- Written by: Marc Camoletti; René de Obaldia
- Starring: Danny Boy
- Cinematography: Raoul Coutard
- Release date: 1964
- Running time: 108 minutes
- Countries: France; Italy
- Language: French

La Difficulté d'être infidèle (Italian: I piaceri coniugali) is a 1964 French-Italian film directed by Bernard Toublanc-Michel. It was entered into the 14th Berlin International Film Festival.

== Cast ==
- Danny Boy
- Michèle Grellier
- Gisèle Hauchecorne
- Carlo Nell
- Denise Péronne
- Bernard Tiphaine
- Donatella Turi
- Pierre Vernier
