= Alexandre Breffort =

French screenwriter

Alexandre Breffort (1901–1971) was a French screenwriter.

== Selected filmography ==
- Follow That Man (1953)
