= Bernard Toublanc-Michel =

French film director (1927–2023)

- Born: 6 December 1927; Ancenis, France
- Died: 22 September 2023 (aged 95)
- Occupations: Film director, screenwriter
- Years active: 1953–1992

Bernard Toublanc-Michel (6 December 1927 – 22 September 2023) was a French film director and screenwriter. His 1964 film La pasta linguine was entered into the 14th Berlin International Film Festival. Toublanc-Michel died on 22 September 2023, at the age of 95.

== Selected filmography ==
- Âmes d'argile (1955) (Short Film)
- Le Champ du possible (1955) (Short Film)
- La Difficulté d'être infidèle (1964)
- L'Or du duc (1965) codirection with Jacques Baratier
- Five Ashore in Singapore (Cinq gars pour Singapour) (1967)
- Adolphe ou l'âge tendre (1968)
- Le Petit Bougnat (1970) starring Isabelle Adjani
- Malicious Pleasure (Le Malin plaisir) (1975)
- Julien Fontanes, magistrat (1980) (TV Series)
