= Okuka =

Okuka (Serbian: Окука) is a Serbian surname. It is also a Luo (Acholi) surname. It may refer to:

- Dragan Okuka (born 1954), Serbian football manager and a former player
- Dražen Okuka (born 1986), Serbian footballer
- Đorđe Okuka (born 1996), Bosnian-Herzegovina footballer
- Miloš Okuka (born 1944), Serbian linguist and professor
