= Andrićgrad =

Andrićgrad Андрићград
- Town
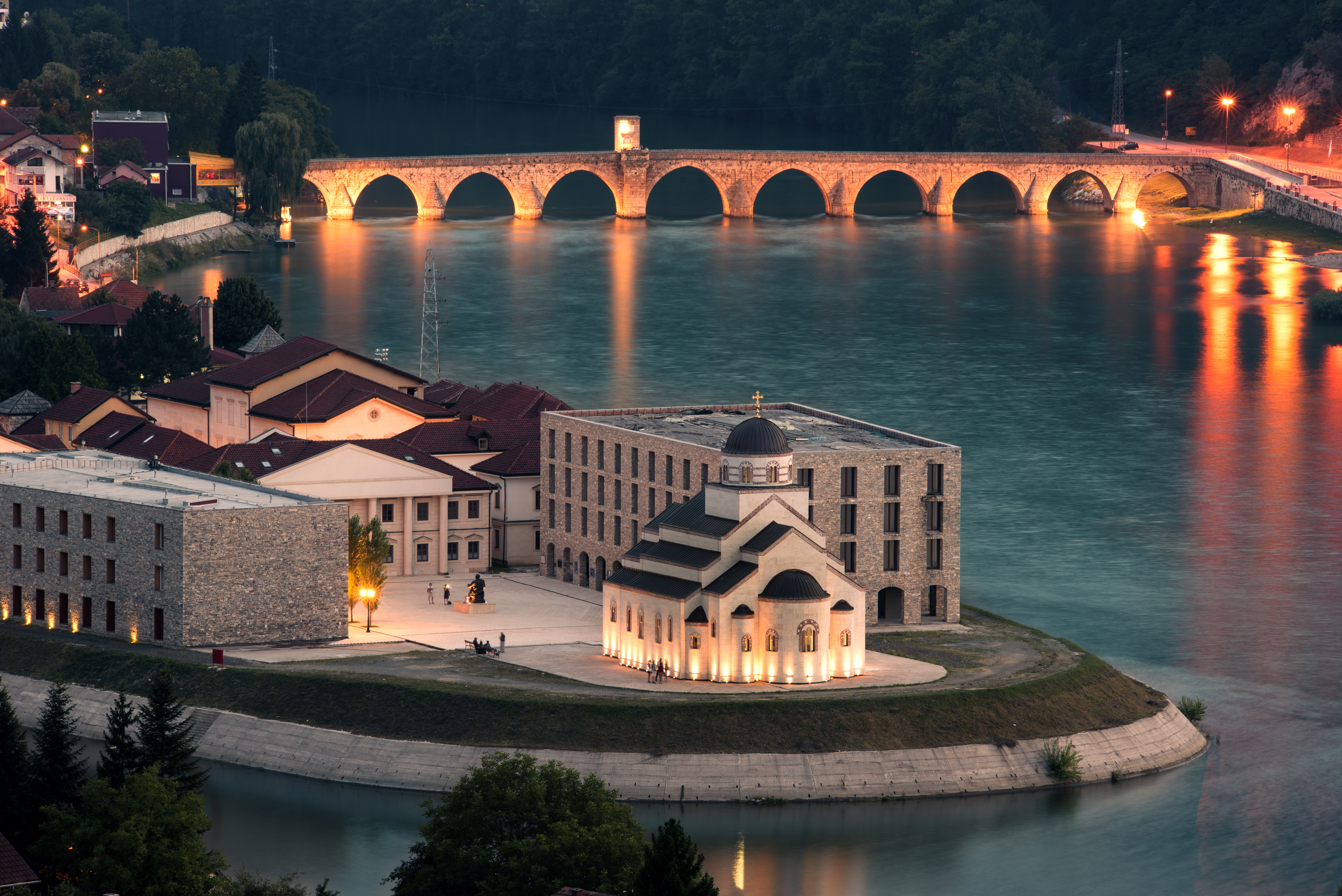
- Andrićgrad and the Mehmed Paša Sokolović Bridge in the background

- Location within Bosnia and Herzegovina Andrićgrad (Balkans) Andrićgrad (Europe)
- Coordinates: 43°47′11.2092″N 19°17′38.817″E
- Country: Bosnia and Herzegovina
- Municipality: Višegrad
- Founder: Emir Kusturica
- Time zone: UTC+1 (CET)
- Website: andricgrad.com

Andrićgrad (Serbian Cyrillic: Андрићград, lit. "Andrić's town") is the name of a construction project located in Višegrad, Republika Srpska, Bosnia and Herzegovina by film director Emir Kusturica. The town is dedicated to the Yugoslav novelist and Nobel Prize for Literature laureate Ivo Andrić.

At the same site, some of the worst ethnic cleansing of the Bosnian wars took place only two decades before construction started.

Construction of Andrićgrad, also known as Kamengrad (Каменград, "Stonetown") started on 28 June 2011 (Vidovdan, and was officially opened on 28 June 2014, on Vidovdan (also exactly 100 years since Archduke Franz was shot). Andrićgrad is located several kilometers from Kusturica's first town, Drvengrad, in Serbia.

Andrićgrad was, in 2022, the venue used for the twelfth edition of Bina Mira, a youth festival that focuses on peace and equality between nations, that drew over 80 students from Belgium, Bosnia and Herzegovina, Croatia, Germany, Romania, Serbia and Slovenia.

== Overview ==
Andrićgrad is located near the Mehmed Paša Sokolović Bridge, a UNESCO World Heritage Site, and stretches from the bridge up to the confluence of the Rzav River. After Küstendorf (English: coastal village), this is the second village Kusturica created from scratch. Andrićgrad is to be used as a location for Kusturica's film adaptation of the novel The Bridge on the Drina by Ivo Andrić.

The town has a lot of shops and services for incoming guests, amongst them are a gift shop, a kneipe, a restaurant, a cinema, a book shop and a gallery.

== Honorary citizens ==
Honorary citizens are people who have been awarded with Key to the City. They are:

- Milorad Dodik, politician in Bosnia and Herzegovina
- Vuk Jeremić, President of the 67th session of the UN General Assembly
- Matija Bećković, writer
- Novak Đoković, tennis player

== See also ==
- Drvengrad

== Gallery ==
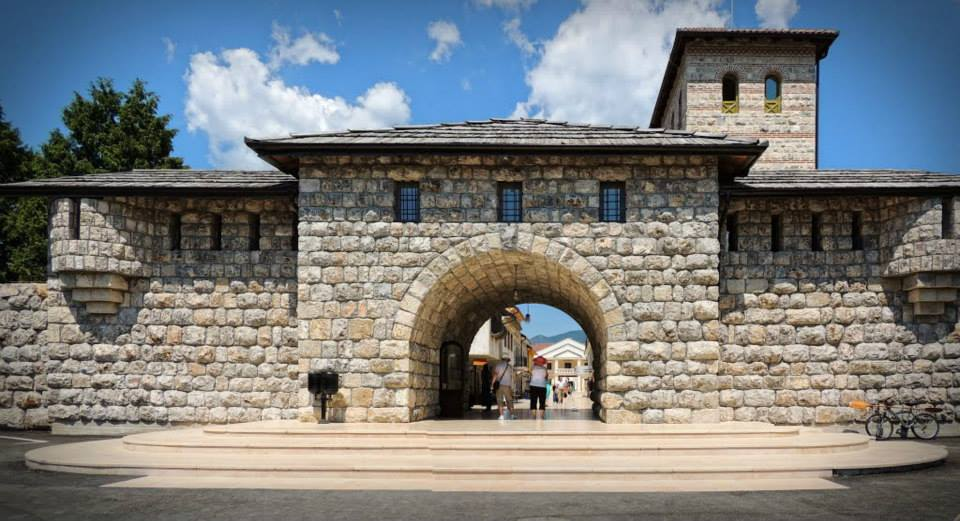
Main entrance of Andrićgrad.

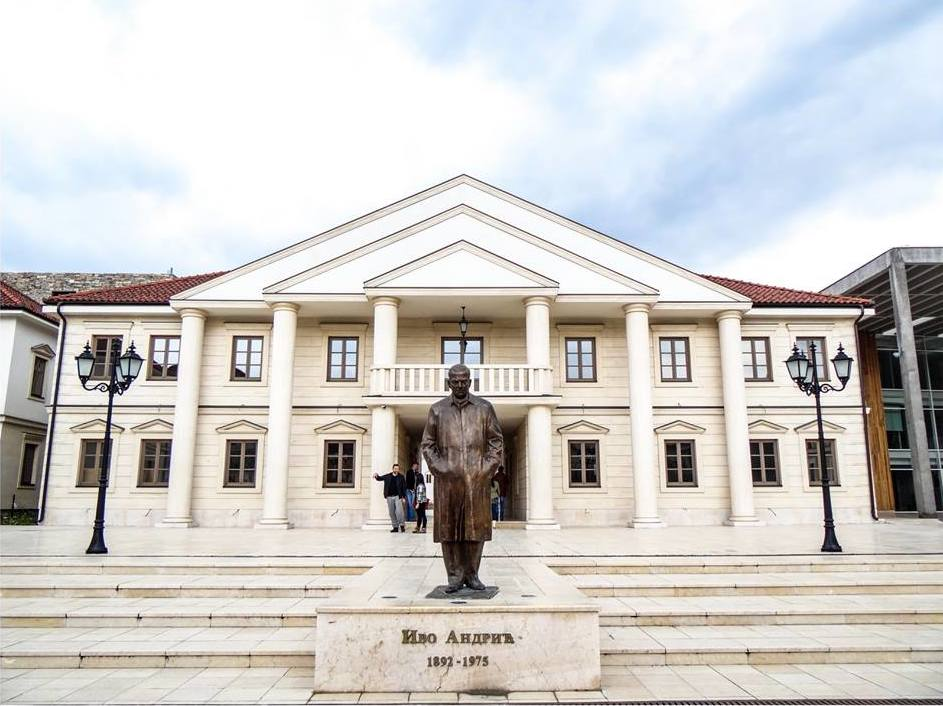
Main square of Andrićgrad.

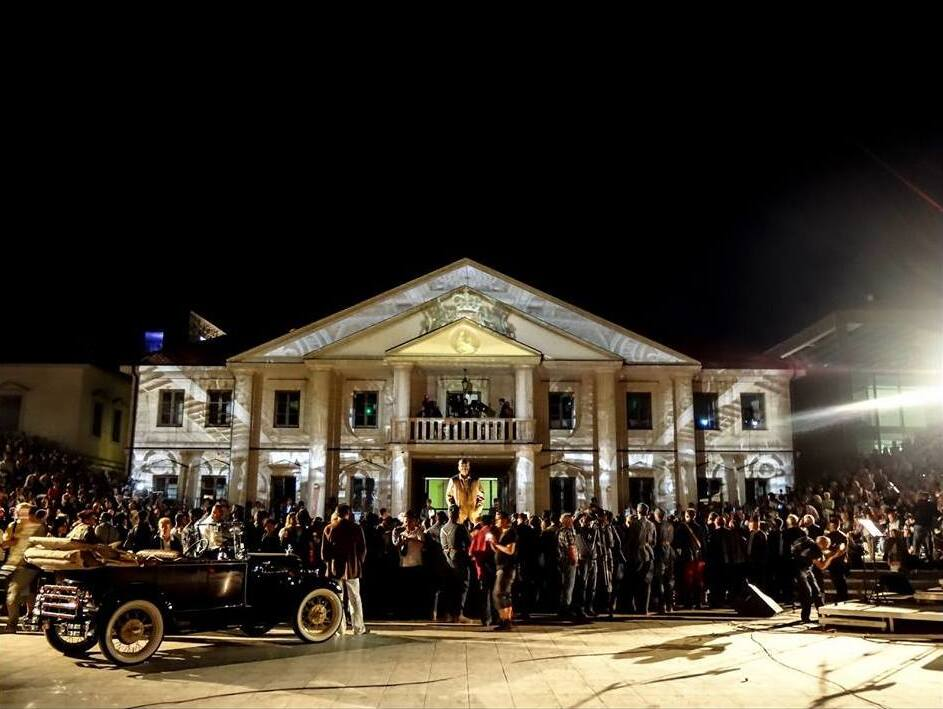
Andrićgrad during opening ceremony on 28 June 2014.

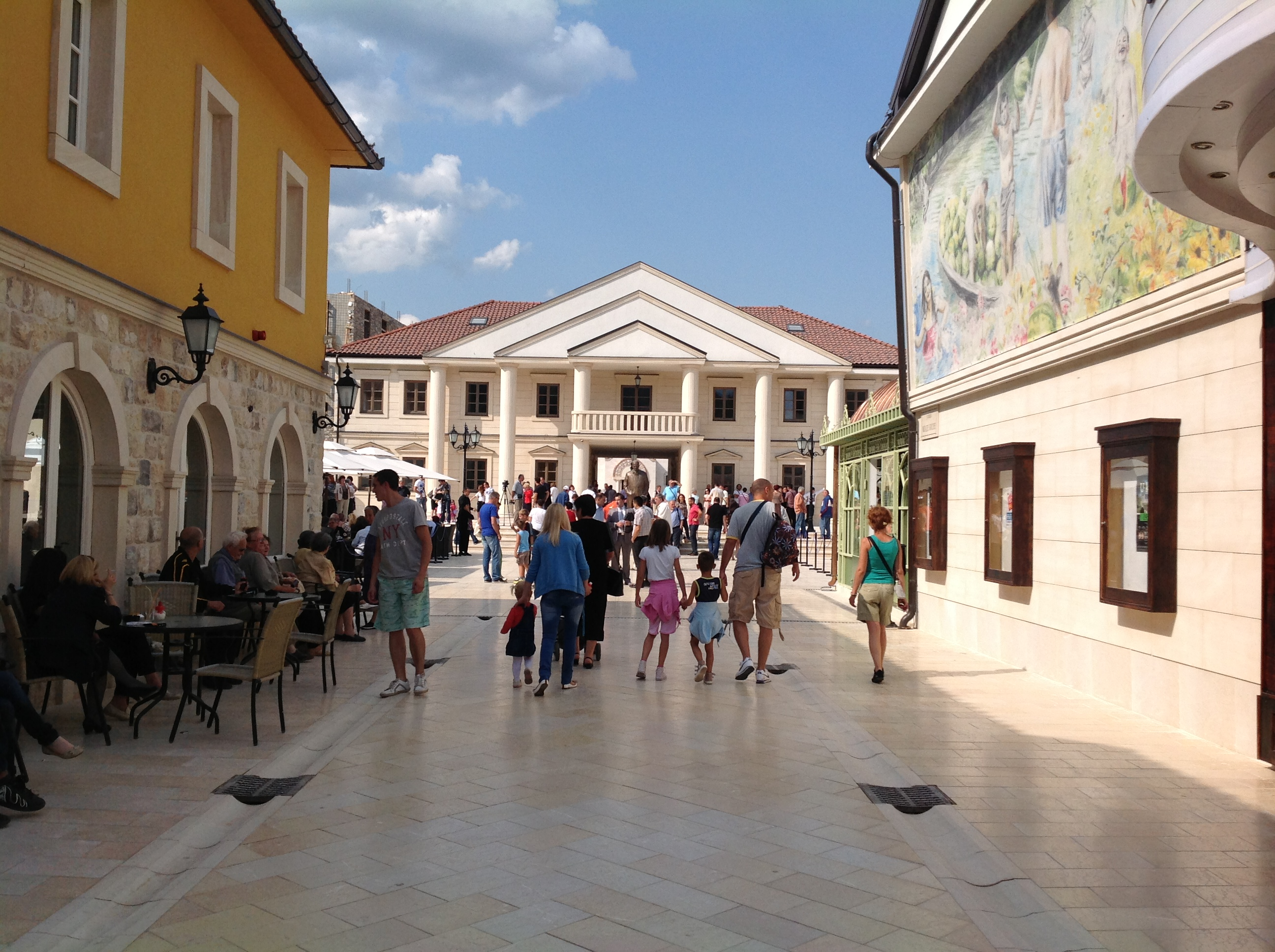
Main street in Andrićgrad.

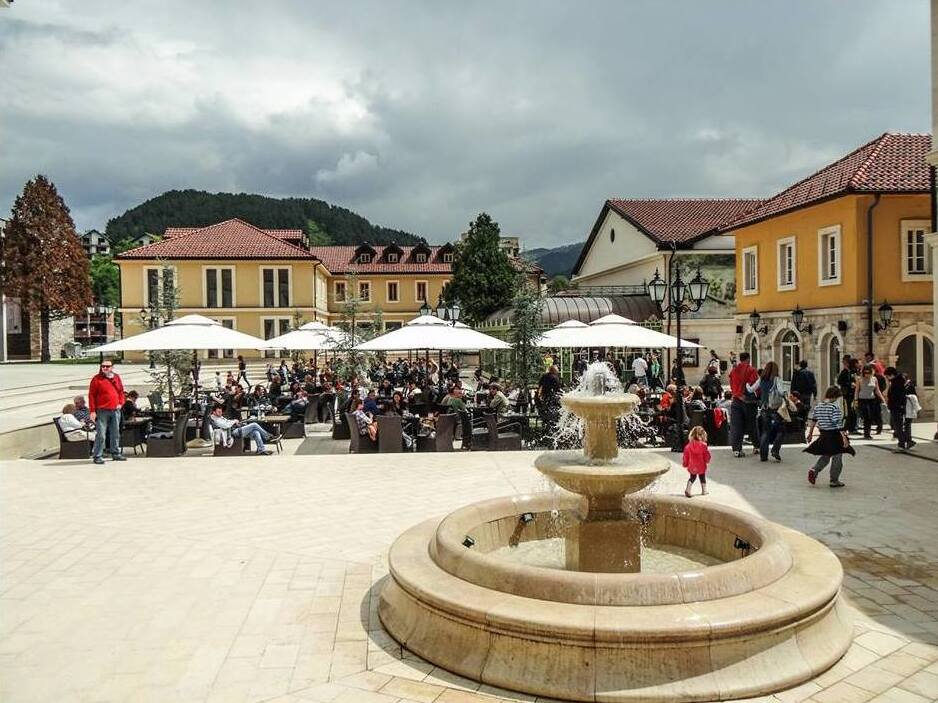
Square in Andrićgrad.

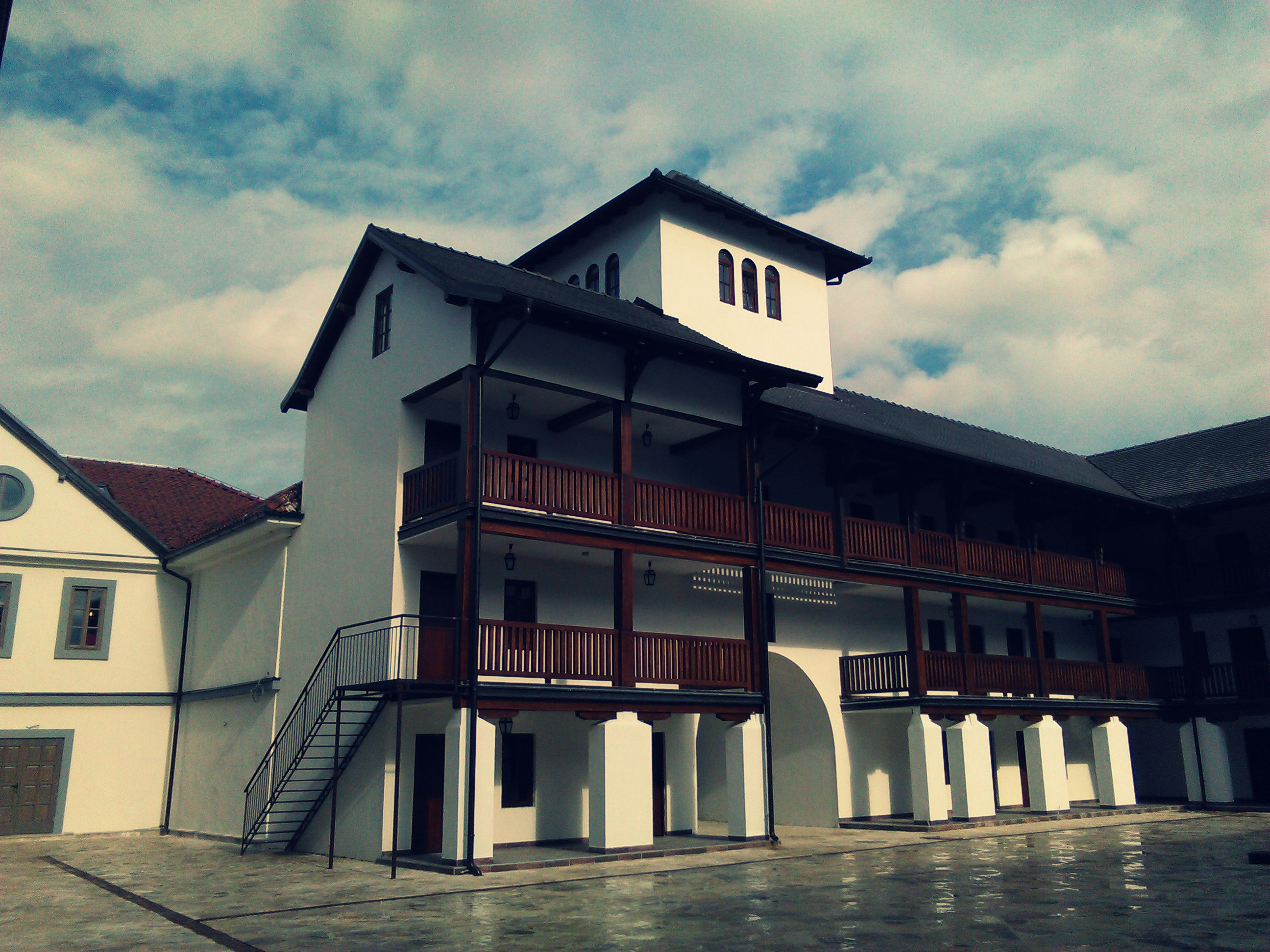
Serbian medieval architecture

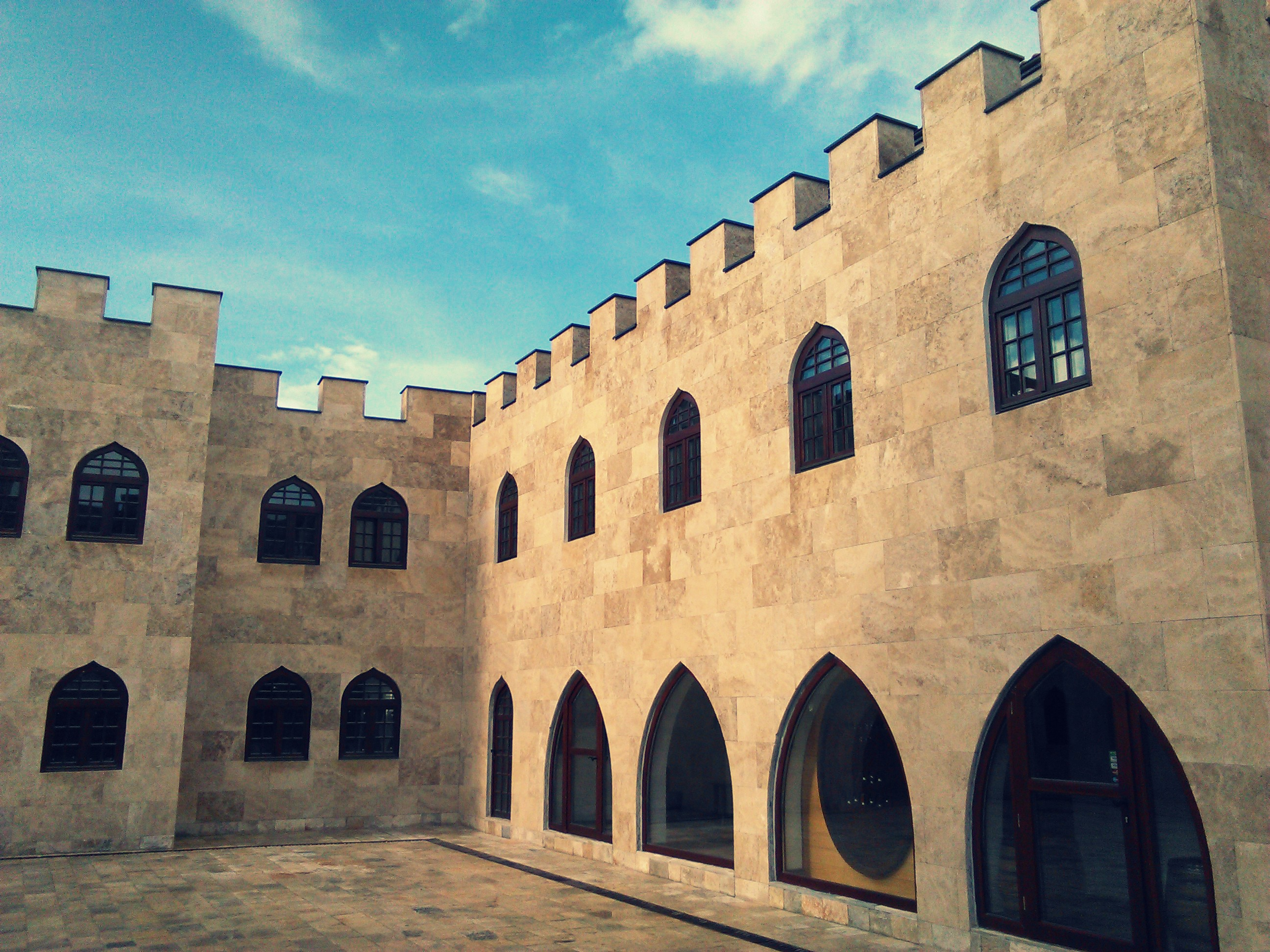
Oriental architecture

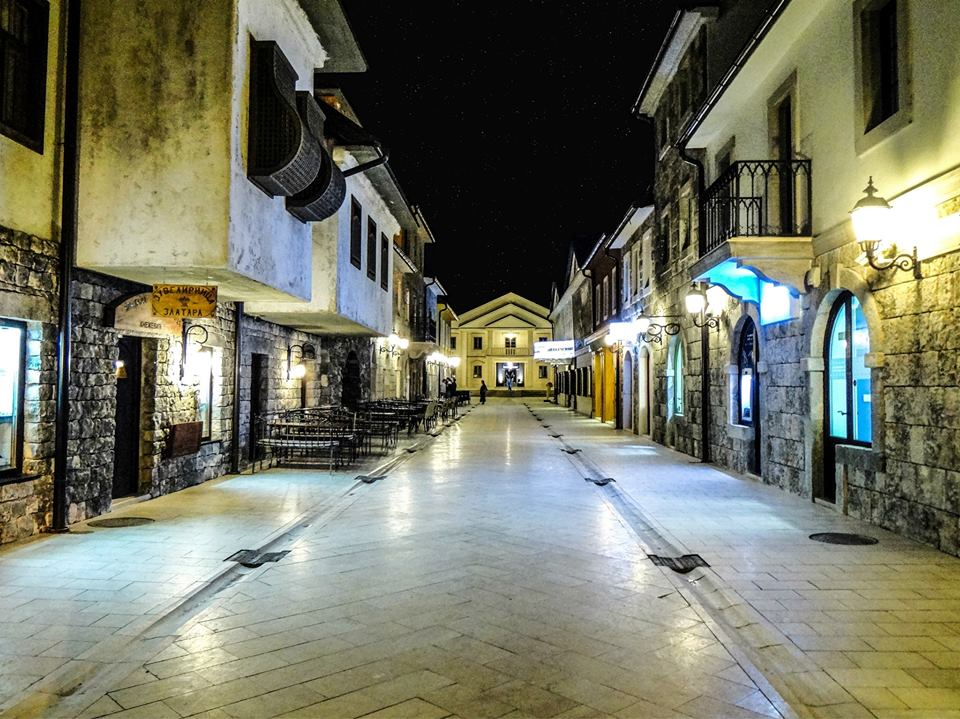
Andrićgrad at night.

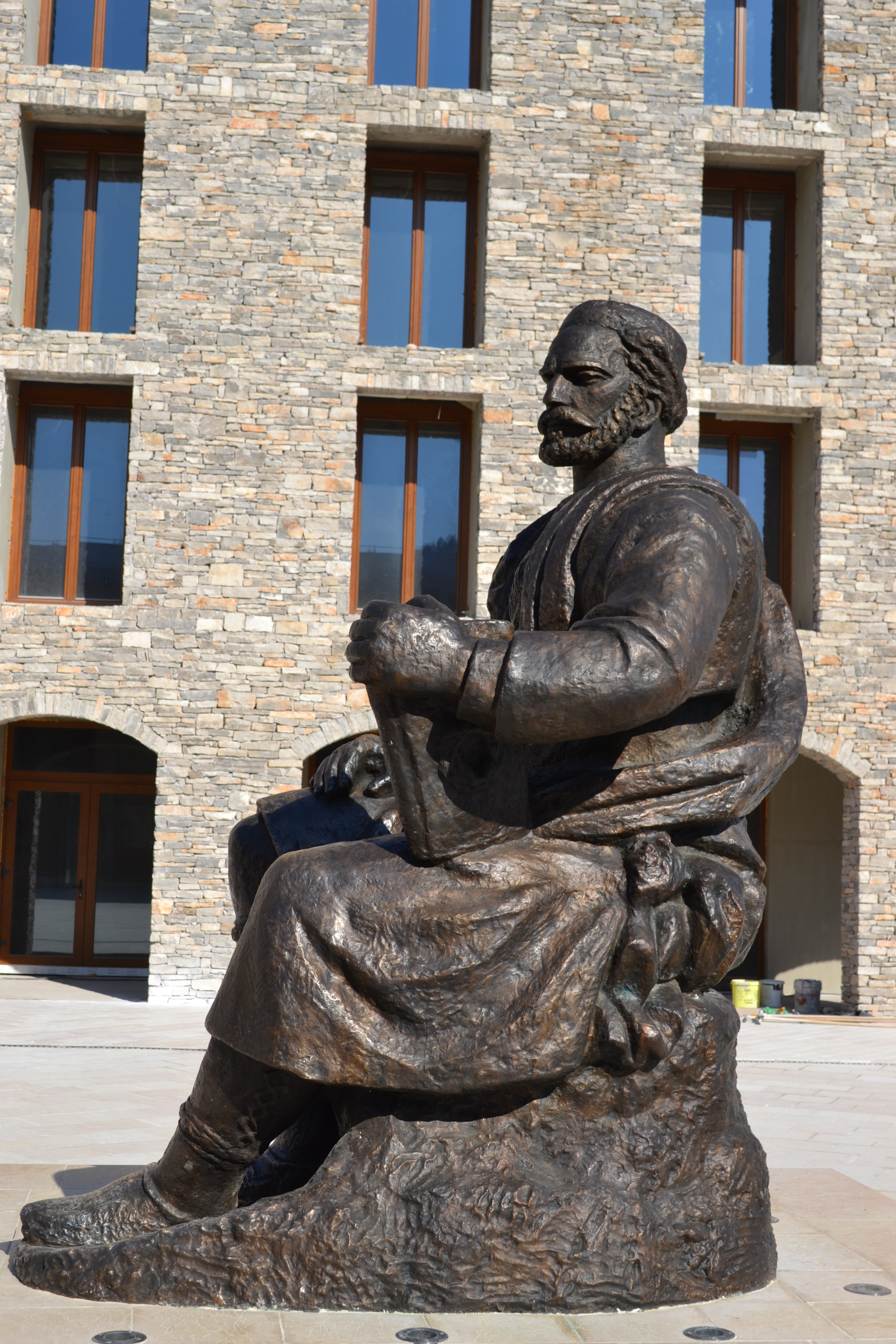
Petar II Petrović-Njegoš monument

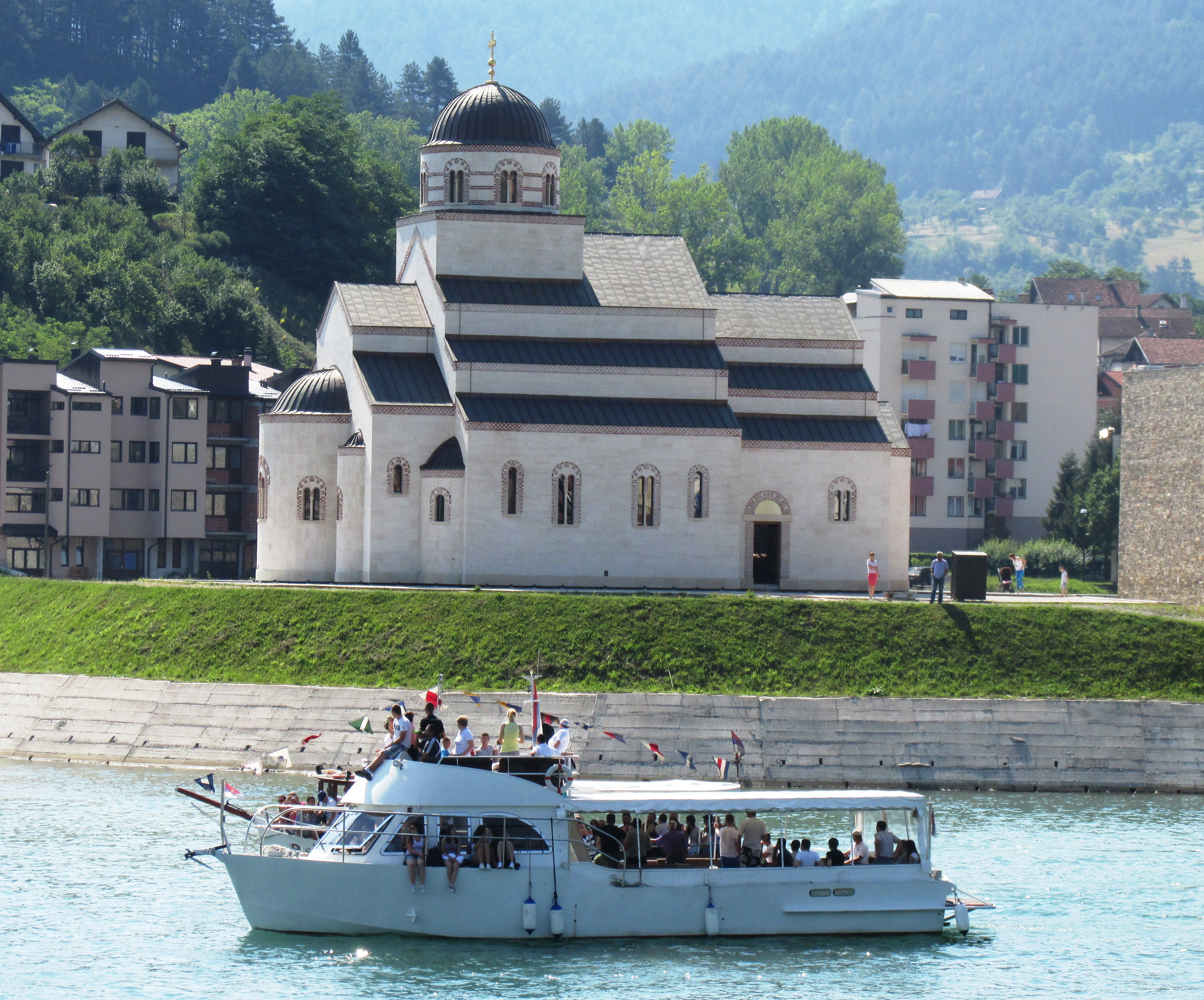
Tourist boat

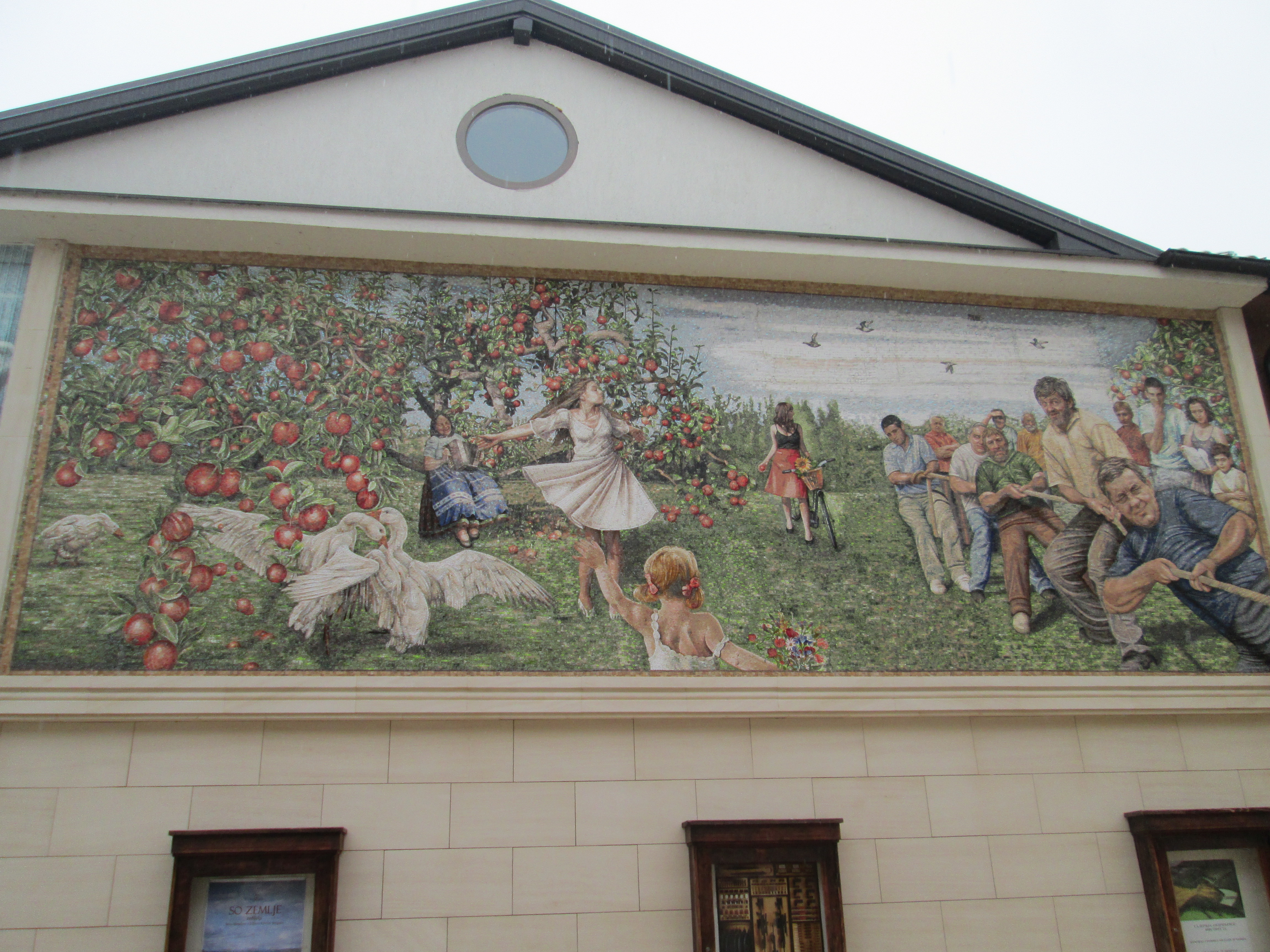
Mural

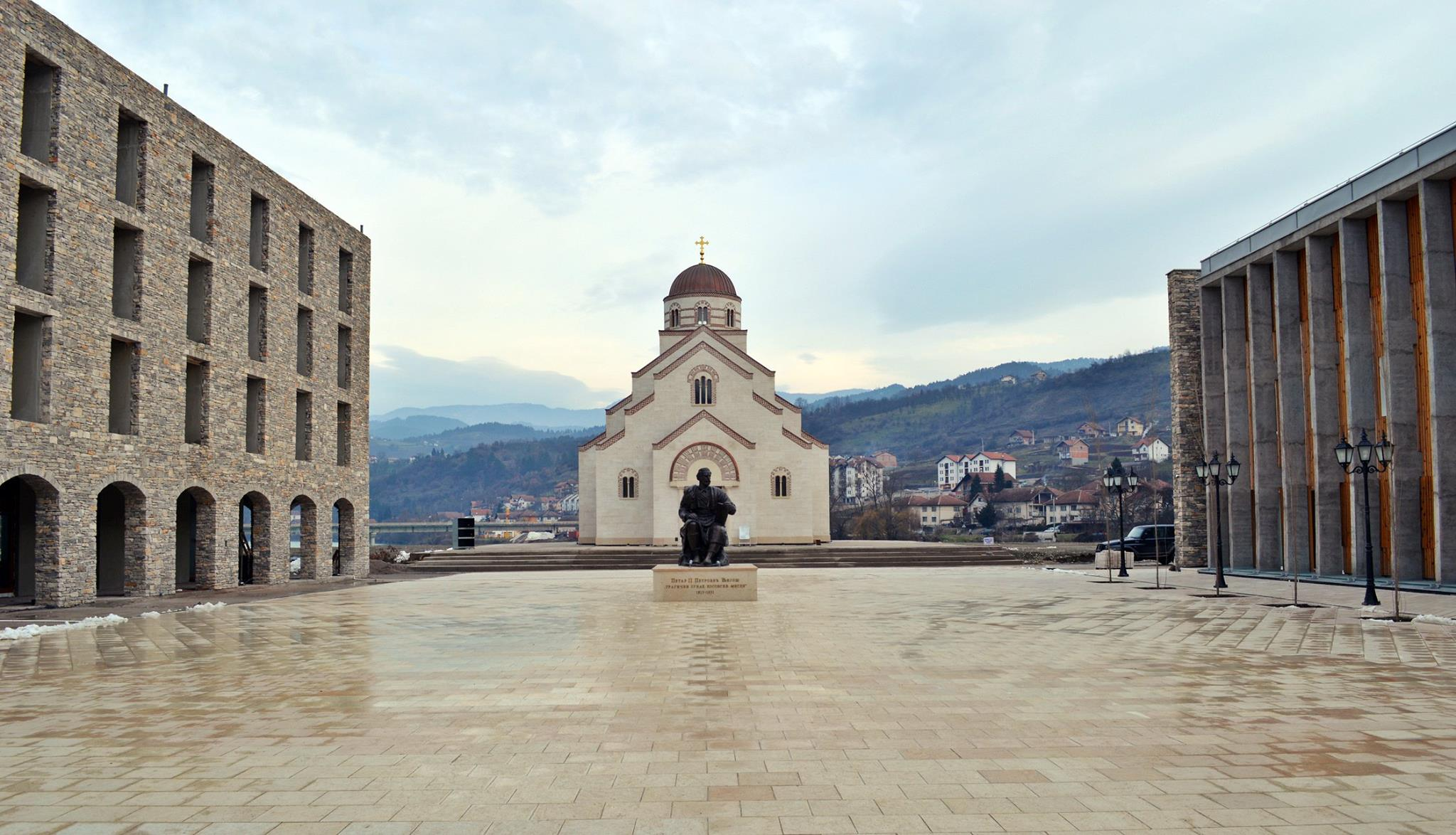
Petar II Petrović Njegoš Square
