= Küstendorf =

Küstendorf Кустендорф Drvengrad (Дрвенград) Mećavnik Мећавник
- Village
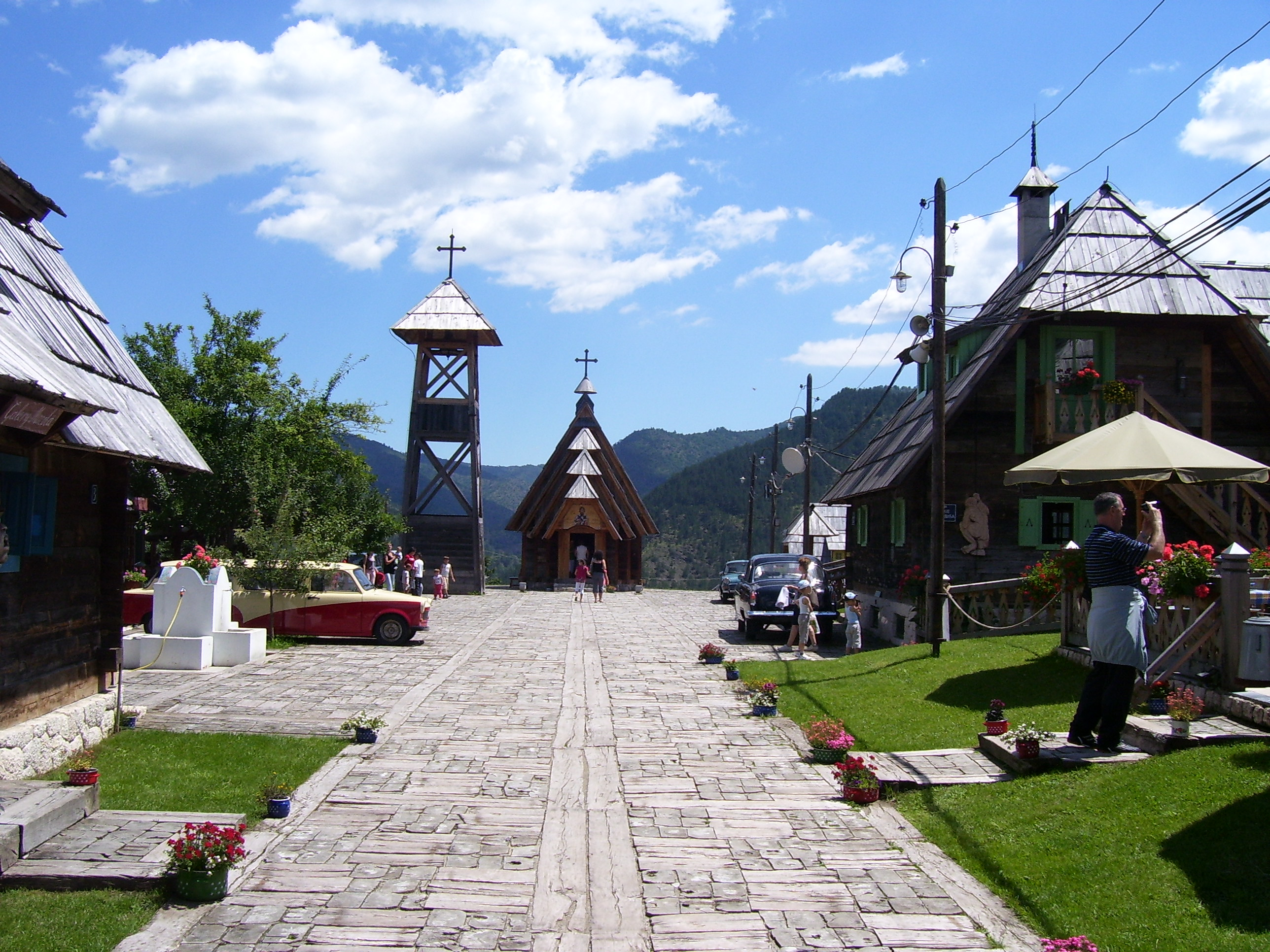
- Küstendorf main street

- Location within Serbia
- Coordinates: 43°47′44.25″N 19°30′29.13″E
- Country: Serbia
- District: Zlatibor District
- Municipality: Užice
- Founder: Emir Kusturica
- Time zone: UTC+1 (CET)
- Website: mecavnik.info

Küstendorf (Serbian: Kustendorf / Кустендорф), also known as Drvengrad (Serbian Cyrillic: Дрвенград, lit. 'Timber Town', pronounced [dř̩ʋeŋɡrad]) and Mećavnik (Serbian Cyrillic: Мећавник, pronounced [mětɕaːʋniːk]), is a traditional village that the Serbian film director Emir Kusturica built for his film Life Is a Miracle from 2003 to 2004. It is located near the village of Mokra Gora in western Serbia, in the administrative area of Užice. Kusturica was the 2005 recipient of the Philippe Rotthier European Architecture award.

== The idea ==
Emir Kusturica stated:

I lost my city [Sarajevo] during the war. That is why I wished to build my own village. It bears a German name: Küstendorf. I will organize seminars there, for people who want to learn how to make cinema, concerts, ceramics, painting. It is the place where I will live and where some people will be able to come from time to time. There will be of course some other inhabitants who will work. I dream of an open place with cultural diversity which sets up against globalization.

== Village ==
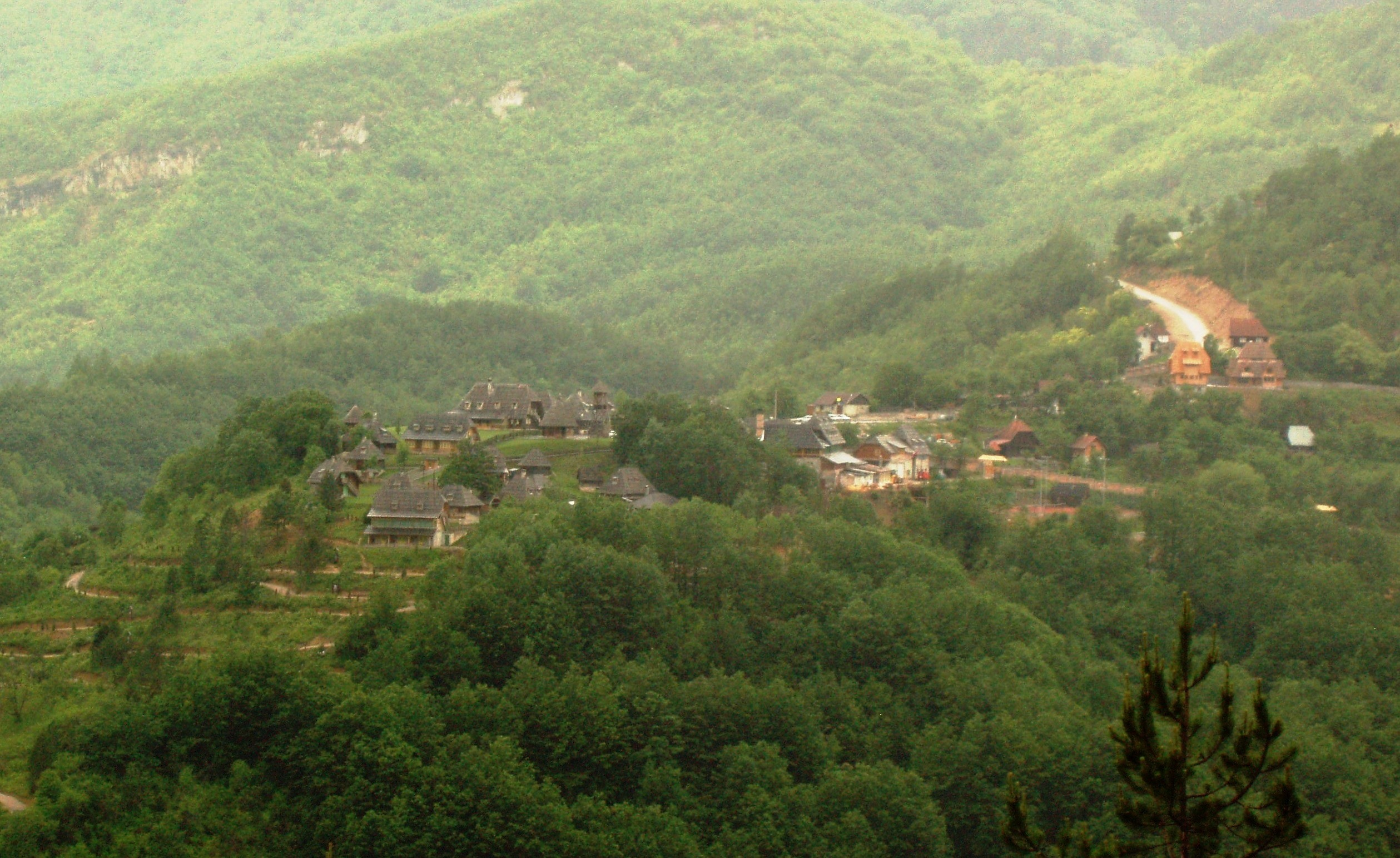
Overview of the entire Drvengrad village

Küstendorf is a word play on German "dorf" (village) and Kusturica's nickname, "Kusta". Also, "Küste" is German for coast. Kusturica has also been known to call it Mećavnik, which is the name of the neighbouring village.

Küstendorf has a library, named the Ivo Andrić Library and an artist gallery named Macola in honor of sculptor Dragan Jovićević (it was previously known as Anika, after a character from Ivo Andrić's prose).

There is the Stanley Kubrick Theater, a sports hall, a restaurant, a cake shop, as well as a souvenir shop and finally. The main house, which houses a cinema-hall in the cellar, a living room, a guest room, a closed yard, a swimming pool, a gymnasium, a sauna and private rooms for the Kusturica family. The middle of the village marks the Serbian-Orthodox Church dedicated to Holy Sava.

Nearby is also a ski slope with four trails, as well as a hotel named Mladost (Youth).

The streets in the village bear the names of various individuals that Kusturica holds in high esteem or finds to be personally significant: Nikola Tesla, Ernesto "Che" Guevara, Diego Maradona, Miodrag Petrović Čkalja, Federico Fellini, Ingmar Bergman, Joe Strummer, Novak Djokovic, and Ivo Andrić, after whom the main street is named.

== Film and music festival ==
Since 2008, the village hosts the annual Küstendorf Film and Music Festival, which showcases films and music from all around the world. The festival is known for not having a red carpet as well as none of the popular Hollywood festival artifacts.

In 2010, it was visited by actor Johnny Depp. During his visit, a statue dedicated to him was unveiled.

Due to the COVID-19 pandemic the festival was not hosted in the year 2021.

== Gallery ==
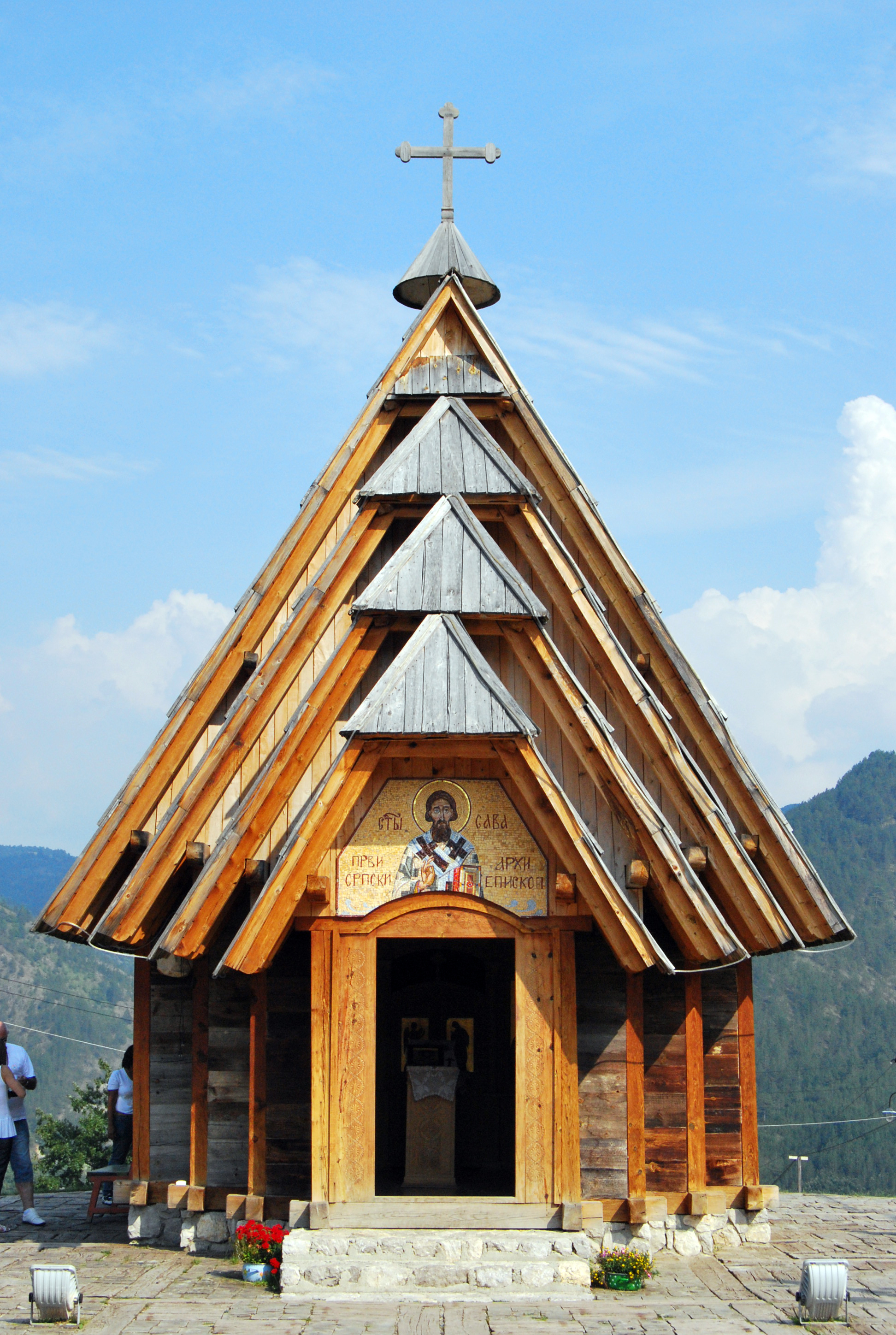
St. Sava church in Drvengrad

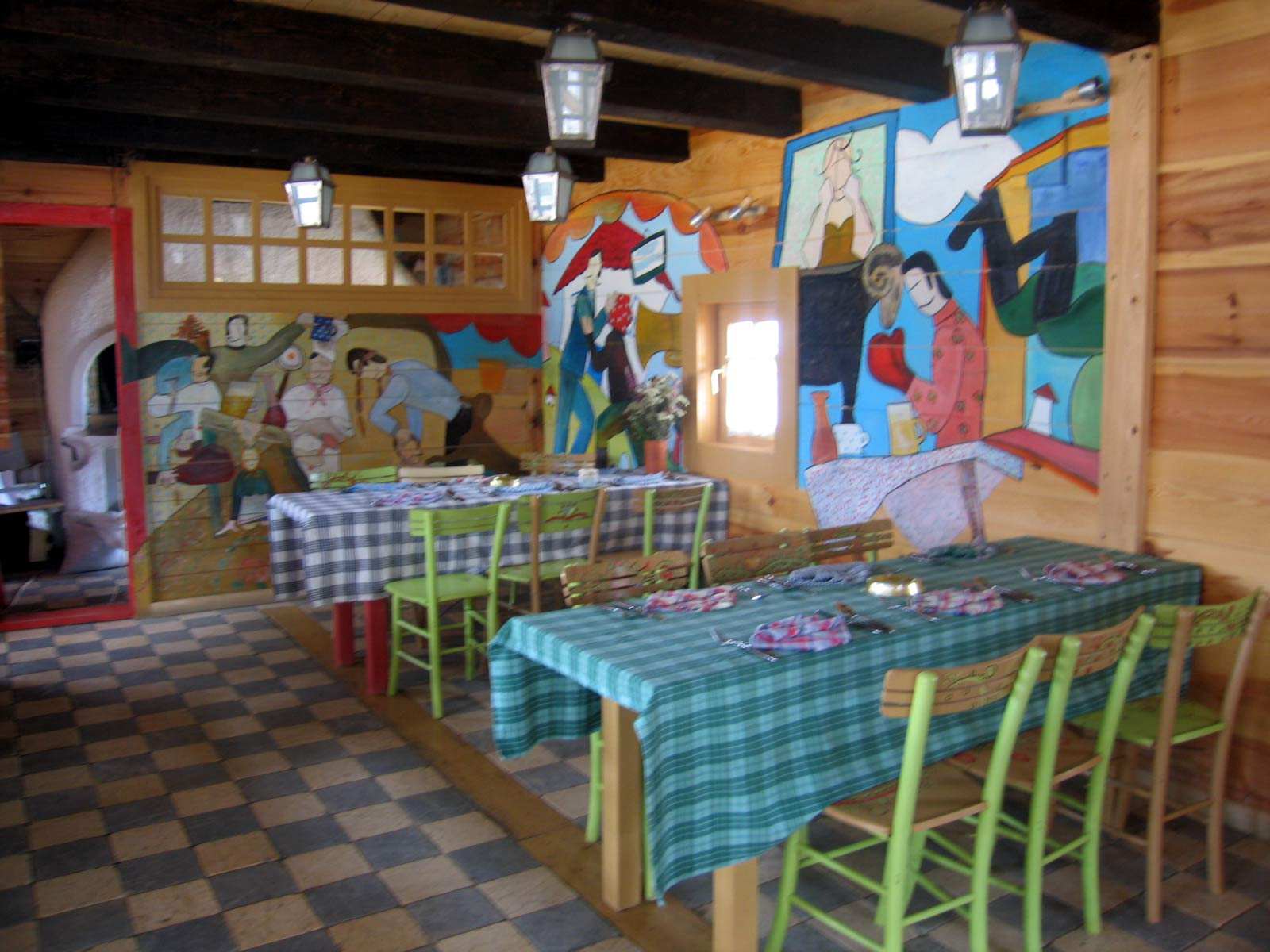
One of the restaurants in Drvengrad

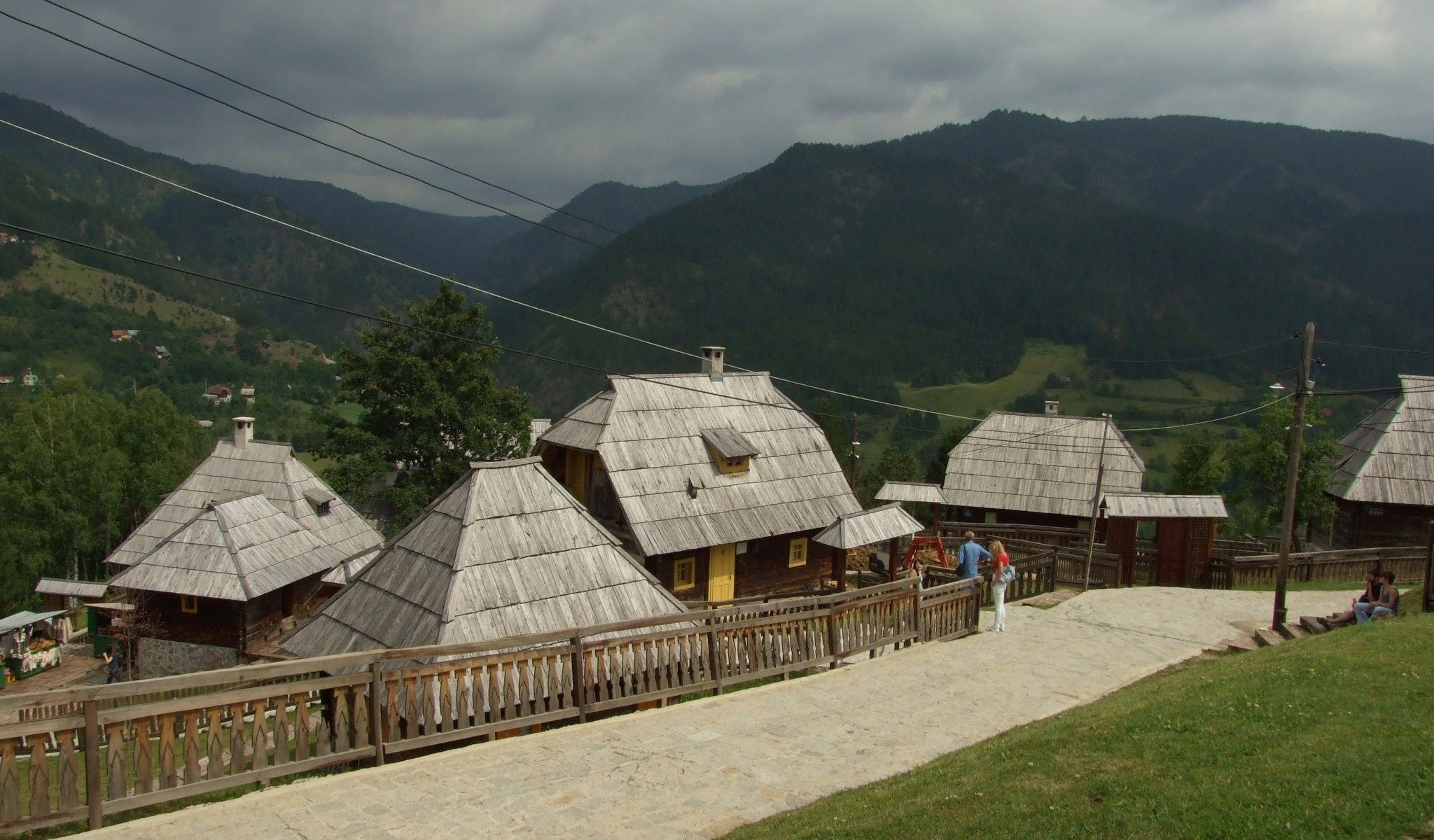
Drvengrad houses

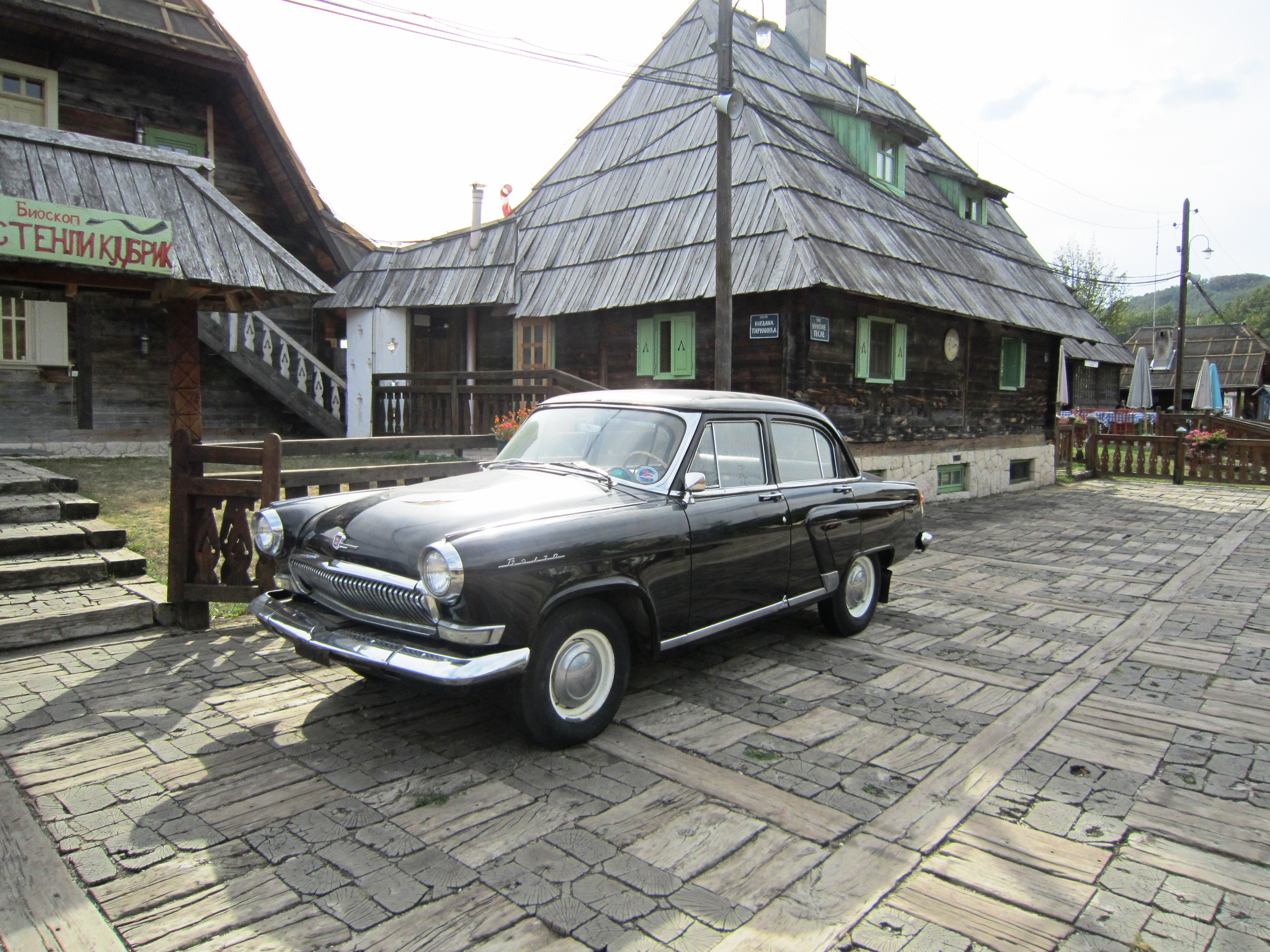

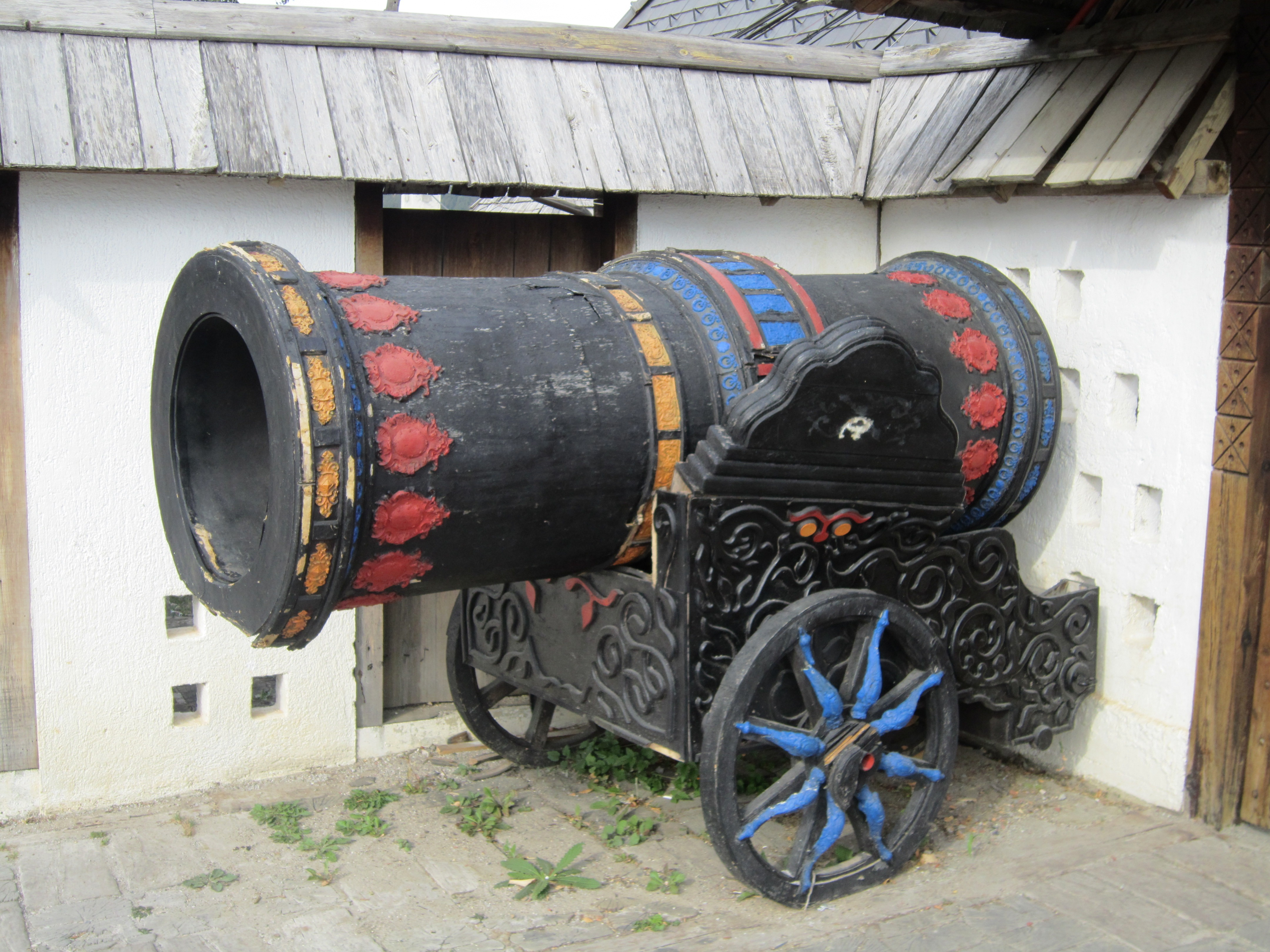

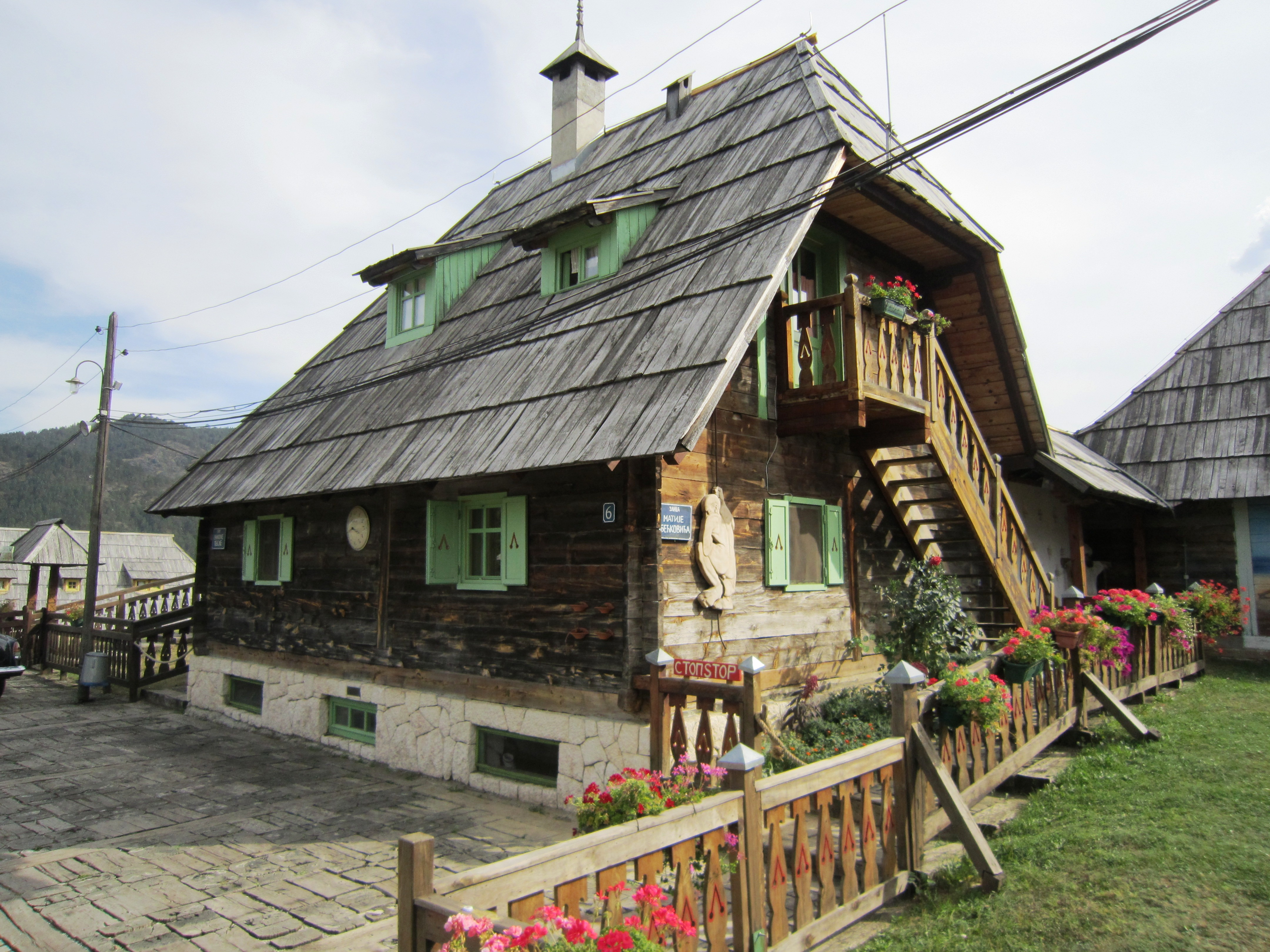

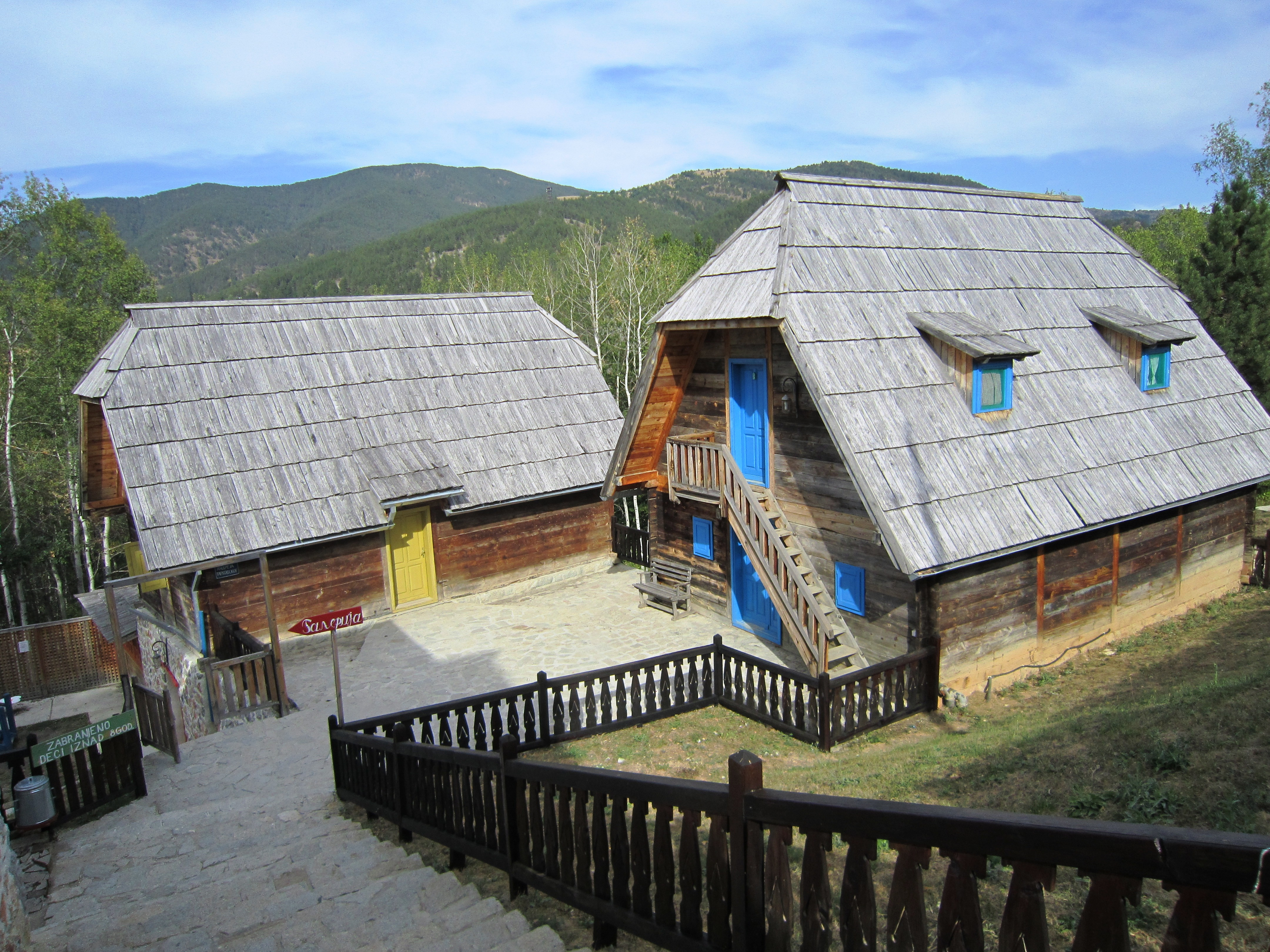

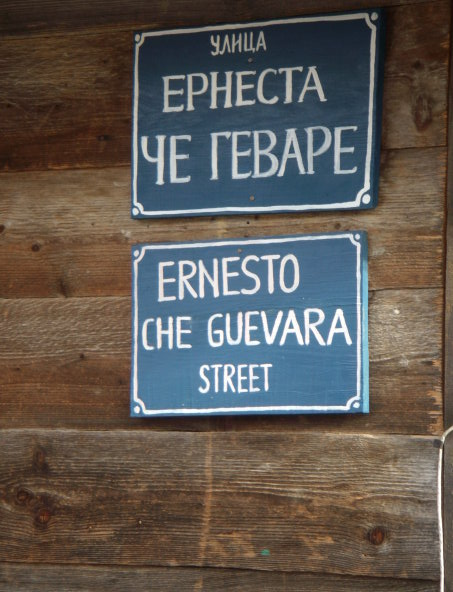

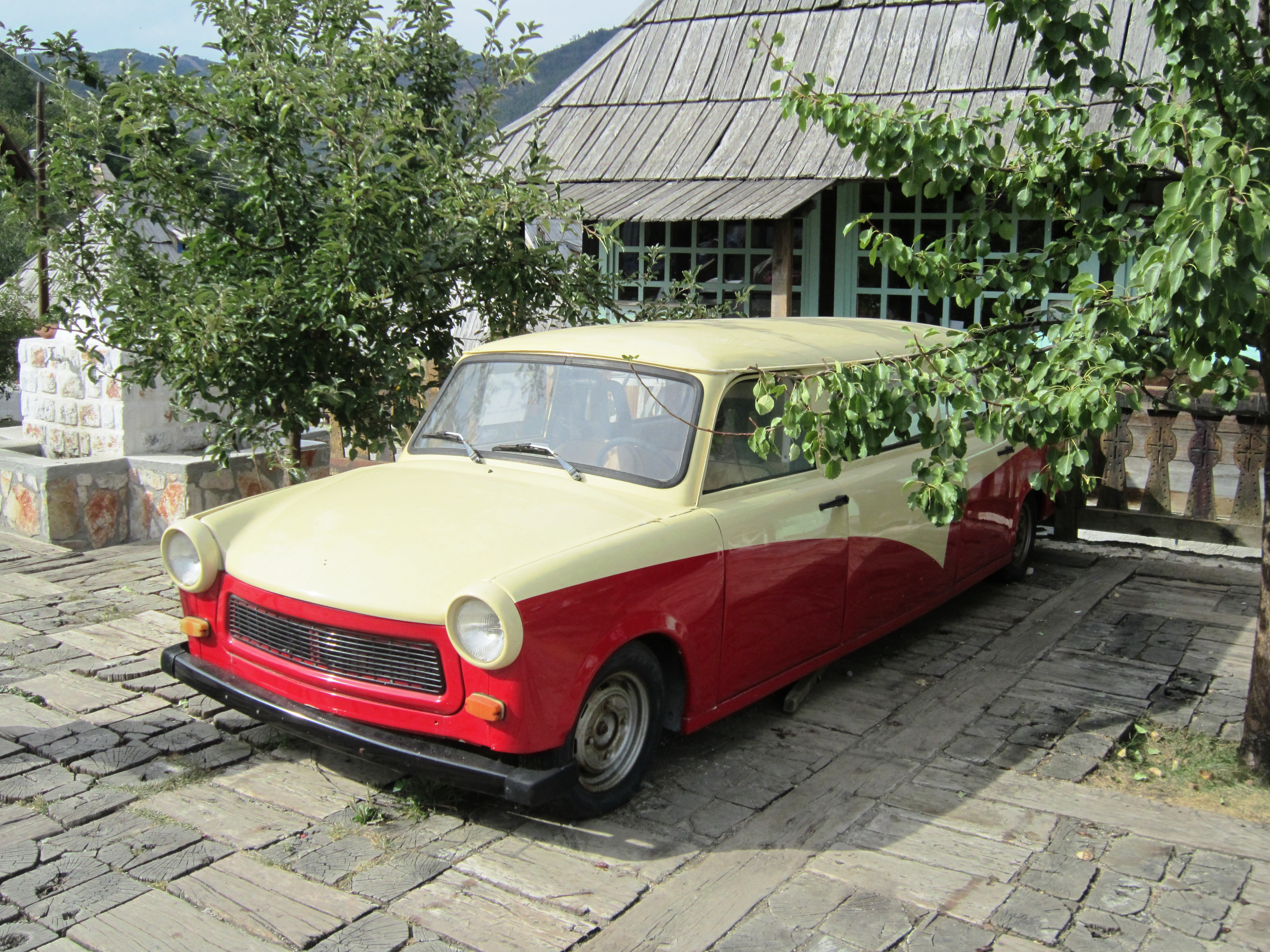

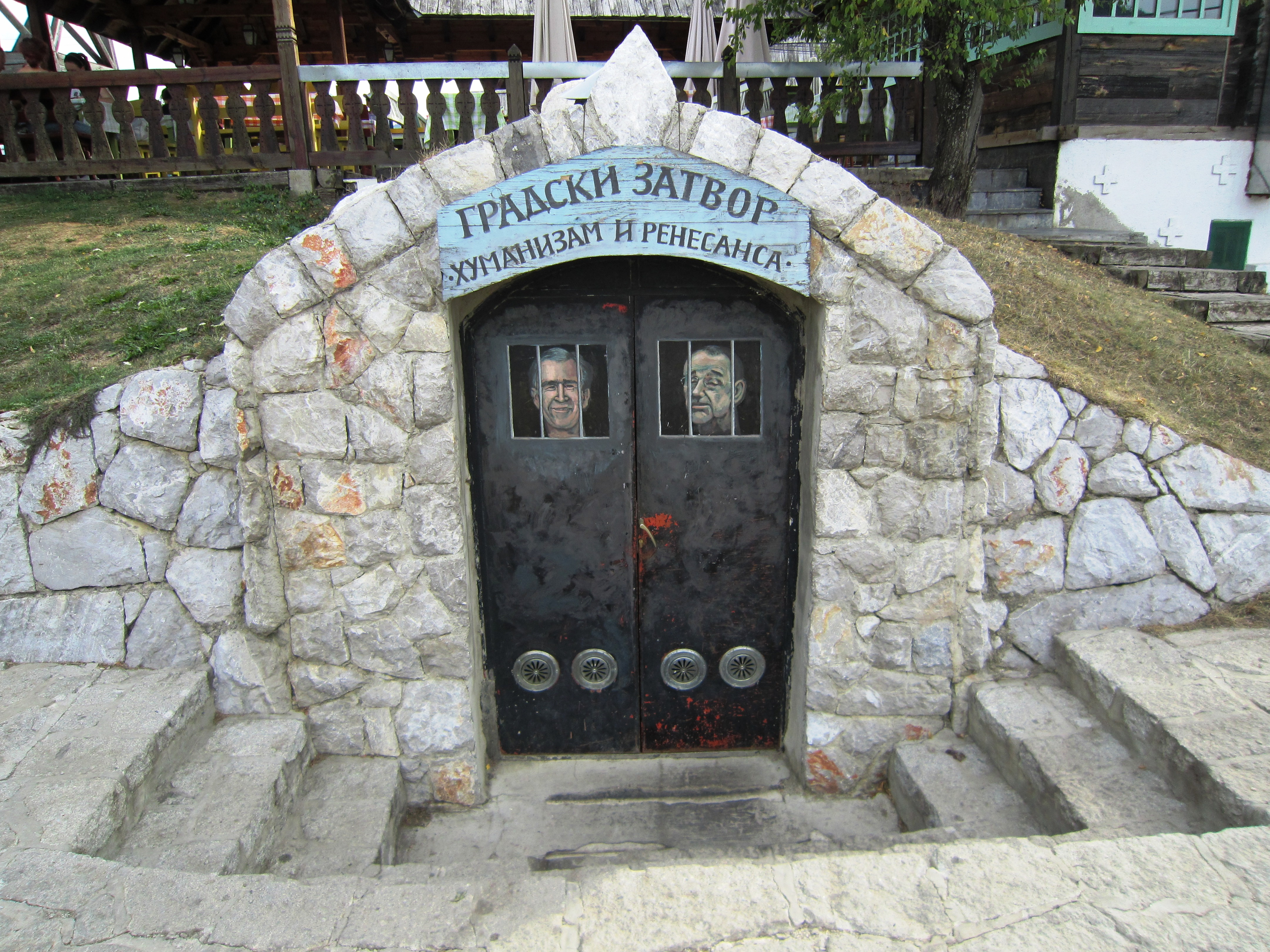

== See also ==
- Andrićgrad, another town built by Emir Kusturica, located in Višegrad, Republika Srpska, Bosnia and Herzegovina.
