= Dobrun Monastery =

Serbian Orthodox monastery near Višegrad, Bosnia and Herzegovina

Coordinates: 43.756667°N 19.3975°E

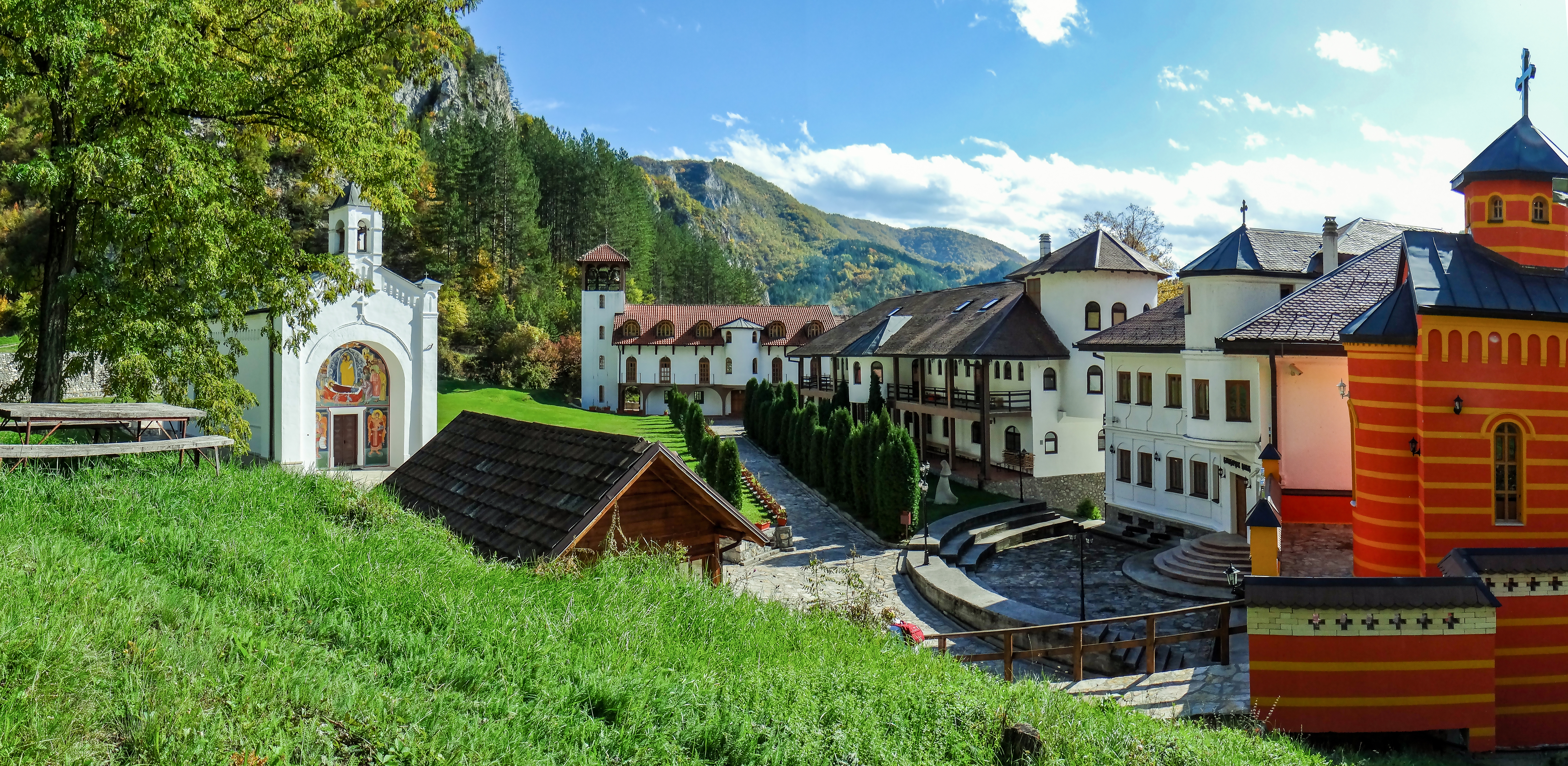
Dobrun Monastery

The Dobrun Monastery (Serbian: Манастир Добрун, romanized: Manastir Dobrun) is located in Bosnia and Herzegovina, 12 km away from town of Višegrad, in the gorge of the Rzav river near the border with Republic of Serbia. Dobrun Monastery is dedicated to the Dormition of the Virgin and was built in 1343 by Duke Pribil and his sons Stefan and Petar. Dobrun is on the Tentative List of National Monuments of Bosnia and Herzegovina by KONS.

== See also ==
The main chapel at the Dobrun Monastery

- List of Serbian Orthodox monasteries
