= Pribil (župan) =

- župan (count)
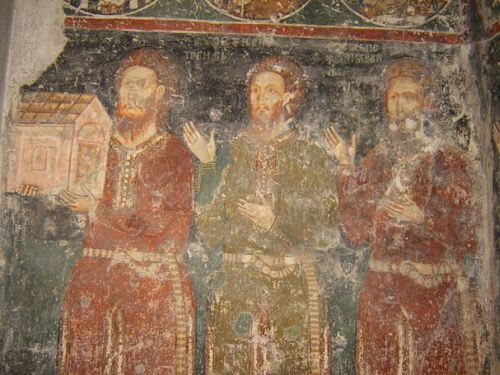
- Fresco of Pribil and his sons
- Buried: Dobrun Monastery in Dobrun, Višegrad
- Family: Pribilović
- Spouse: Boleslava
- Memorials: Dobrun Monastery (endowment)

Pribil (Serbian Cyrillic: Прибил, fl. 1370s) was a Serbian župan (count) who built the Dobrun Monastery in Dobrun, Višegrad, as a family funeral church. He founded the church together with his sons, župan Petar and župan Stefan. There are frescoes of the family, and of a higher-ranked nobleman, protovestijar Stan, who was Pribil's father-in-law.

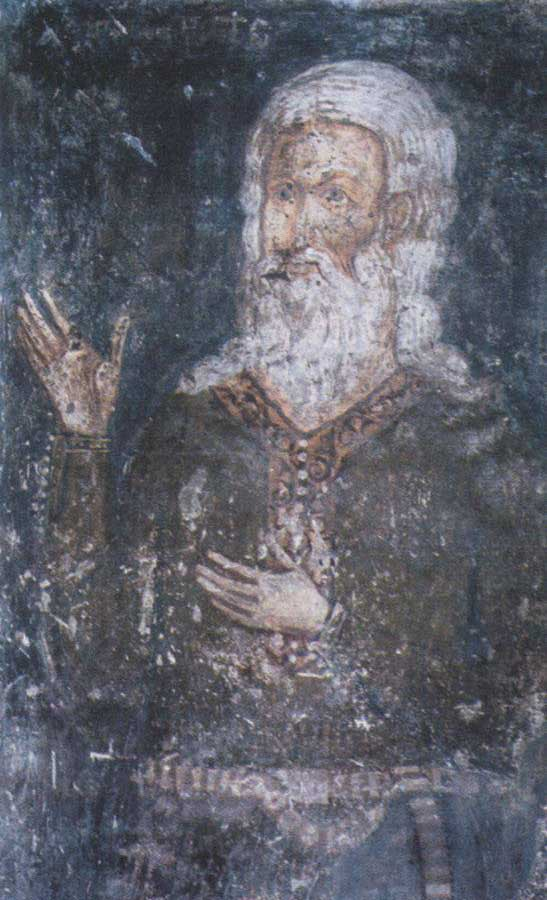
Protovestijar Stan.

The founding date of the monastery is uncertain. Dates have been given as: reign of King Stefan Dušan (before 1343); 1360–70; and 1370s.

== Family ==
With his wife Boleslava, he had two sons:

- župan Petar (fl. 1383), took monastic vows as Jovan
- župan Stefan

== See also ==
- Dobrun Monastery
- Serbian nobility
