= Đorđe Okuka =

Bosnian association football player

Personal information
- Full name: Đorđe Okuka
- Date of birth: June 20, 1996 (age 30)
- Place of birth: Višegrad, Bosnia and Herzegovina
- Height: 1.87 m (6 ft 2 in)
- Position: Winger

Team information
- Current team: Sutjeska Foča
- Number: 11

Senior career*
Years	Team	Apps	(Gls)
2016–2018	Drina HE Višegrad		
2018–	Sutjeska Foča	29	(4)

International career^{‡}
- Bosnia and Herzegovina U17
- Bosnia and Herzegovina U19
- Bosnia and Herzegovina U21
- * Club domestic league appearances and goals as of 8 June 2019 ‡ National team caps and goals as of 7 December 2018

Đorđe Okuka (born 20 June 1996 in Višegrad) is a Bosnian-Herzegovinian professional footballer who plays as a winger for Second League of RS (Group East) club FK Sutjeska Foča.

== Club career ==
Okuka started his career with FK Drina HE Višegrad in 2016. In 2018, he left Drina and joined First League of the Republika Srpska club FK Sutjeska Foča. He played a cup game for Alfa Modriča in 2019.

== Personal life ==
Đorđe Okuka has family relation with notable Serbian football coach Dragan Okuka.
