= Višegrad =

Višegrad Вишеград
- Town and municipality
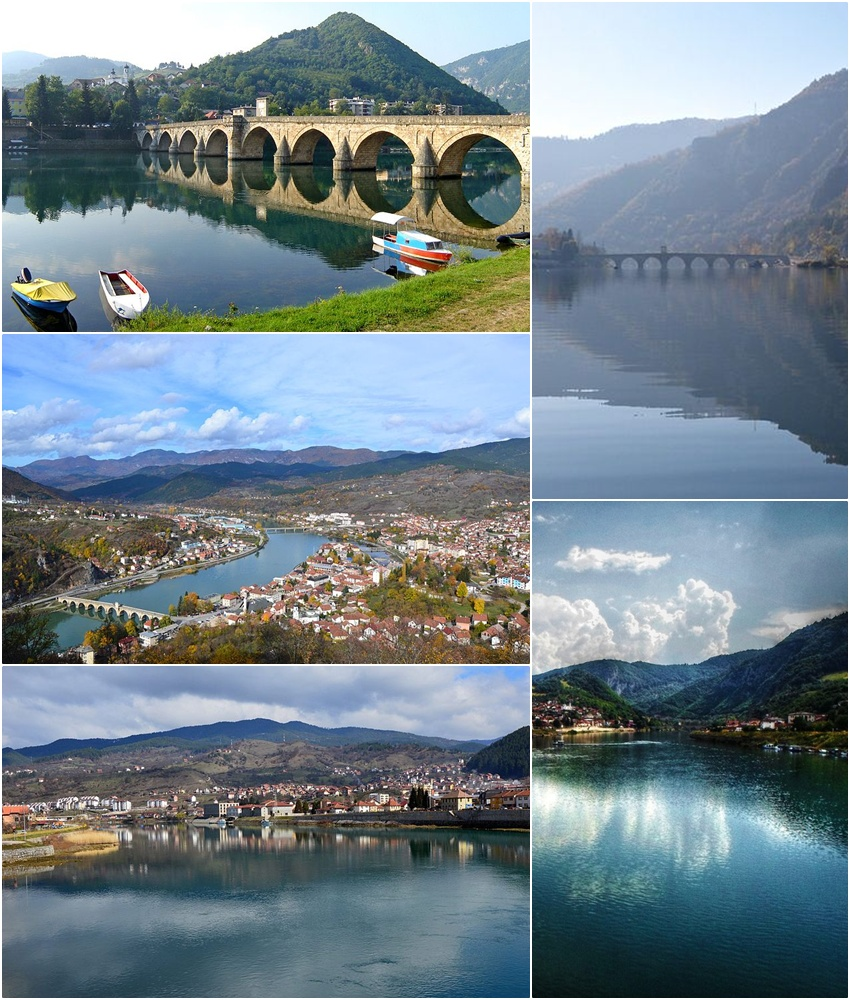
- Višegrad

- Coat of arms

- Location of Višegrad in Bosnia and Herzegovina

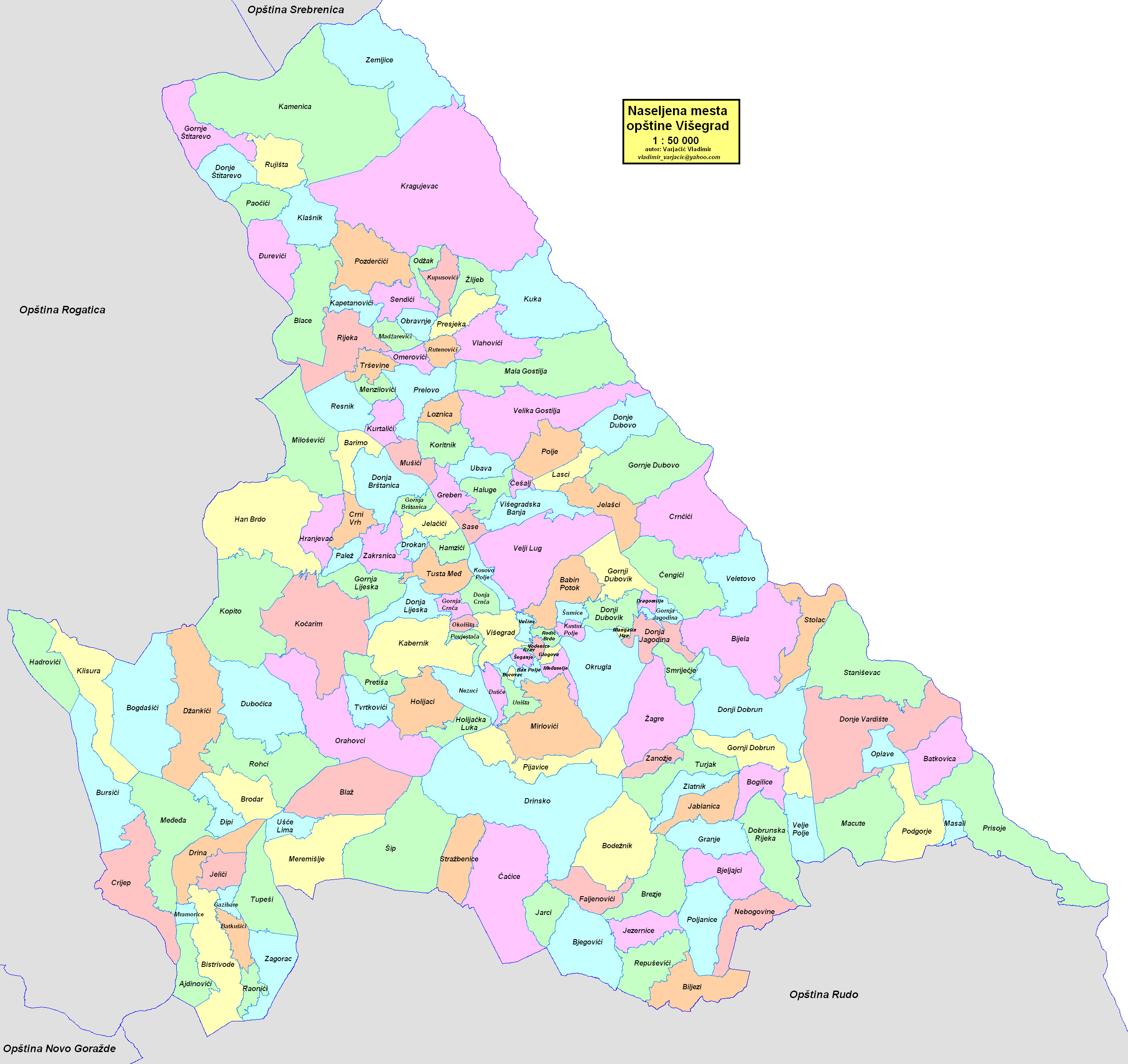
- Coordinates: 43°46′58″N 19°17′28″E
- Country: Bosnia and Herzegovina
- Entity: Republika Srpska
- Geographical region: Podrinje

Government
  - Municipal mayor: Mladen Đurević (SNSD)

Area
  - Total: 448.14 km^{2} (173.03 sq mi)
- Elevation: 389 m (1,276 ft)

Population (2013 census)
  - Total: 10,668
  - Density: 23.805/km^{2} (61.655/sq mi)
- Postal code: 73240
- Area code: +387 58
- Website: opstinavisegrad.com

Višegrad (Serbian Cyrillic: Вишеград, pronounced [ʋǐʃeɡraːd]) is a town and municipality in Republika Srpska, Bosnia and Herzegovina. It rests at the confluence of the Drina and the Rzav river. As of 2013, the municipality has a population of 10,668 inhabitants, while the town of Višegrad has a population of 5,869 inhabitants.

The town includes the Ottoman-era Mehmed Paša Sokolović Bridge, a UNESCO world heritage site which was popularized by Ivo Andrić in his novel The Bridge on the Drina. A tourist site called Andrićgrad (Andrić Town), dedicated to Andrić, is located near the bridge.

== Etymology ==
Višegrad is a South Slavic toponym originally meaning an upper castle within a city.

== Geography ==
Višegrad is located at the confluence of the Drina river and the Rzav river in eastern Bosnia and Herzegovina, on the road from Goražde and Ustiprača towards Užice, Serbia, which is part of the geographical region of Podrinje. It is also part of the historical region of Stari Vlah; the immediate area surrounding the town was historically called "Višegradski Stari Vlah", noted as an ethnographic region in which the population was closer to Užice, located on the Serbian side of the River Drina, than to the surrounding areas.

=== Climate ===
Višegrad has a temperate climate (Köppen: Cfb/Cfa) with cold winters, hot summers, and moderate precipitation year-round.

Climate data for Višegrad (1991–2020)
| Month | Jan | Feb | Mar | Apr | May | Jun | Jul | Aug | Sep | Oct | Nov | Dec | Year |
|---|---|---|---|---|---|---|---|---|---|---|---|---|---|
| Mean daily maximum °C (°F) | 4.7 (40.5) | 8.3 (46.9) | 13.2 (55.8) | 18.4 (65.1) | 23.2 (73.8) | 27.2 (81.0) | 29.4 (84.9) | 29.9 (85.8) | 24.2 (75.6) | 18.5 (65.3) | 11.1 (52.0) | 5.1 (41.2) | 17.8 (64.0) |
| Daily mean °C (°F) | 0.6 (33.1) | 2.5 (36.5) | 6.6 (43.9) | 11.4 (52.5) | 16.1 (61.0) | 20.0 (68.0) | 21.8 (71.2) | 21.6 (70.9) | 16.6 (61.9) | 11.7 (53.1) | 6.4 (43.5) | 1.7 (35.1) | 11.4 (52.5) |
| Mean daily minimum °C (°F) | −2.9 (26.8) | −2.0 (28.4) | 1.1 (34.0) | 5.0 (41.0) | 9.6 (49.3) | 13.3 (55.9) | 14.6 (58.3) | 14.6 (58.3) | 10.7 (51.3) | 6.9 (44.4) | 2.7 (36.9) | −1.6 (29.1) | 6.0 (42.8) |
| Average precipitation mm (inches) | 47.6 (1.87) | 52.5 (2.07) | 50.4 (1.98) | 63.8 (2.51) | 67.0 (2.64) | 70.5 (2.78) | 67.6 (2.66) | 55.1 (2.17) | 65.8 (2.59) | 71.5 (2.81) | 65.1 (2.56) | 71.5 (2.81) | 748.5 (29.47) |
| Average precipitation days (≥ 1.0 mm) | 8.4 | 8.8 | 8.8 | 10.7 | 10.9 | 10.8 | 9.1 | 7.3 | 8.1 | 8.3 | 8.8 | 9.8 | 109.7 |
Source: NOAA

== History ==
=== Middle Ages ===
The area was part of the medieval Serbian state of the Nemanjić dynasty; it was part of the Grand Principality of Serbia under Stefan Nemanja (r. 1166–96). In the Middle Ages, Dobrun was a place within the border area with Bosnia, on the road towards Višegrad. After the death of emperor Stefan Dušan (r. 1331–55), the region came under the rule of magnate Vojislav Vojinović, and then his nephew, župan (count) Nikola Altomanović. The Dobrun Monastery was founded by župan Pribil and his family, some time before the 1370s. The area then came under the rule of the Kingdom of Bosnia, part of the estate of the Pavlović noble family.

The settlement of Višegrad was mentioned in 1407, but started to be mentioned more often after 1427. In the period of 1433–37, a relatively short period, caravans crossed the settlement many times. Many people from Višegrad worked for the Republic of Ragusa. Srebrenica, Višegrad and their surroundings were again in Serbian hands in 1448 after the despot Đurađ Branković defeated the Bosnian forces.

=== Ottoman period ===
According to Turkish sources, in 1454, Višegrad was conquered by the Ottoman Empire led by Osman Pasha. The Mehmed Paša Sokolović Bridge was built by the Ottoman architect and engineer Mimar Sinan for Grand Vizier Sokollu Mehmed Pasha. Construction of the bridge took place between 1571 and 1577. It still stands, and it is now a tourist attraction, after being inscribed in the UNESCO World Heritage Site list.

In 1875, the Serbs from the area between Višegrad and Novi Pazar revolted and formed a volunteer military corps, which fought in the valley of the River Ibar in 1876. In 1882, a Jewish cemetery was established in Višegrad while in 1905, the first Jewish synagogue was built in the town. Višegrad remained under Ottoman rule until the Berlin Congress (1878), when Austria-Hungary took control of Bosnia and Herzegovina.

=== Austro-Hungarian period ===
The Bosnian Eastern Railway from Sarajevo to Uvac and Vardište was built through Višegrad during the Austro-Hungarian rule in Bosnia and Herzegovina. Construction of the line started in 1903. It was completed in 1906, using a 760 mm (2 ft 5 15/16 in) track gauge. Having costed 75 million gold crowns, which is approximately 450 thousand gold crowns per kilometer, it was one of the most expensive railways in the world built at the time. This line was eventually extended to Belgrade in 1928. Višegrad is today part of the narrow-gauge heritage railway Šargan Eight.

=== World War II ===
On 18 April 1941 Ustashe murdered ten Serbs including Dragiša Jakšić, the president of the Dobrun municipality. Many Serbs were executed by the fascist Ustashe regime along the Drina Valley for a month during the Genocide of Serbs, especially near Višegrad. Jure Francetić's Black Legion killed thousands of Bosnian Serb civilians and threw their bodies into the Drina river. In 1942, about 6,000 Serbs were killed in the villages of Miloševići and Stari Brod near Rogatica.

In November 1941, with the help of the Italians, the Serbian royalist Chetniks established a civil and military government in the area of Višegrad, and engaged in genocidal killing of local Bosniaks. Thousands of civilians were massacred in Višegrad in December. In March 1942, 42 Bosniak villagers were burned to death in the village of Drakan.

During the Battle for Višegrad in October 1943, the Chetniks attacked a German garrison and captured the town whose Axis garrison had 350 dead and 400 wounded soldiers. 2,000 Bosniak civilians were killed after the capture of Višegrad. The Yugoslav Partisans took control of Višegrad on 14 February 1945.

=== Bosnian War ===
Višegrad is one of several towns along the River Drina in close proximity to the Serbian border. The town was strategically important during the conflict. A nearby hydroelectric dam provided electricity and also controlled the level of the River Drina, preventing flooding of downstream areas. The town is situated on the main road connecting Belgrade and Užice in Serbia with Goražde and Sarajevo in Bosnia and Herzegovina, a vital link for the Užice Corps of the Yugoslav People's Army (JNA) with the Uzamnica camp as well as other strategic locations involved in the conflict.

On 6 April 1992, JNA artillery bombarded the town, in particular Bosniak-inhabited neighbourhoods and nearby villages. Murat Šabanović and a group of Bosniak men took several local Serbs hostage and seized control of the hydroelectric dam, threatening to blow it up. Water was released from the dam causing flooding to some houses and streets. Eventually on 12 April, JNA commandos seized the dam. The next day the JNA's Užice Corps took control of Višegrad, positioning tanks and heavy artillery around the town. The population that had fled the town during the crisis returned and the climate in the town remained relatively calm and stable during the later part of April and the first two weeks of May. On 19 May 1992 the Užice Corps officially withdrew from the town and local Serb leaders established control over Višegrad and all municipal government offices. Soon after, local Serbs, police and paramilitaries began one of the most notorious campaigns of ethnic cleansing in the conflict.

There were widespread looting and destruction of houses, and terrorizing of Bosniak civilians, with instances of rape, with a large number of Bosniaks killed in the town, with many bodies being dumped in the River Drina. Men were detained at the barracks at Uzamnica, the Vilina Vlas Hotel and other sites in the area. Vilina Vlas also served as a rape camp, in which Bosniak women and girls (some not yet 14 years old at the time), were brought to by police officers and paramilitary members (White Eagles and Arkan's Tigers). According to victims' reports some 3,000 Bosniaks were murdered in Višegrad and its surroundings, including some 600 women and 119 children. Bosniaks detained at Uzamnica were subjected to inhumane conditions, including regular beatings, torture and strenuous forced labour. Both of the town's mosques were razed. According to the Research and Documentation Center, at least 1,661 Bosniaks were killed/missing in Višegrad.

With the Dayton Agreement, which put an end to the war, Bosnia and Herzegovina was divided into two entities, the Federation of Bosnia and Herzegovina and Republika Srpska, the latter which Višegrad became part of.

Before the war, 63% of the town residents were Bosniak. In 2009, only a handful of survivors had returned to what is now a predominantly Serb town. On 5 August 2001, survivors of the massacre returned to Višegrad for the burial of 180 bodies exhumed from mass graves. The exhumation lasted for two years and the bodies were found in 19 different mass graves. The charges of mass rape were unapproved as the prosecutors failed to request them in time. The cousins Milan Lukić and Sredoje Lukić were convicted on 20 July 2009, to life in prison and 30 years, respectively, for a 1992 killing spree of Muslims.

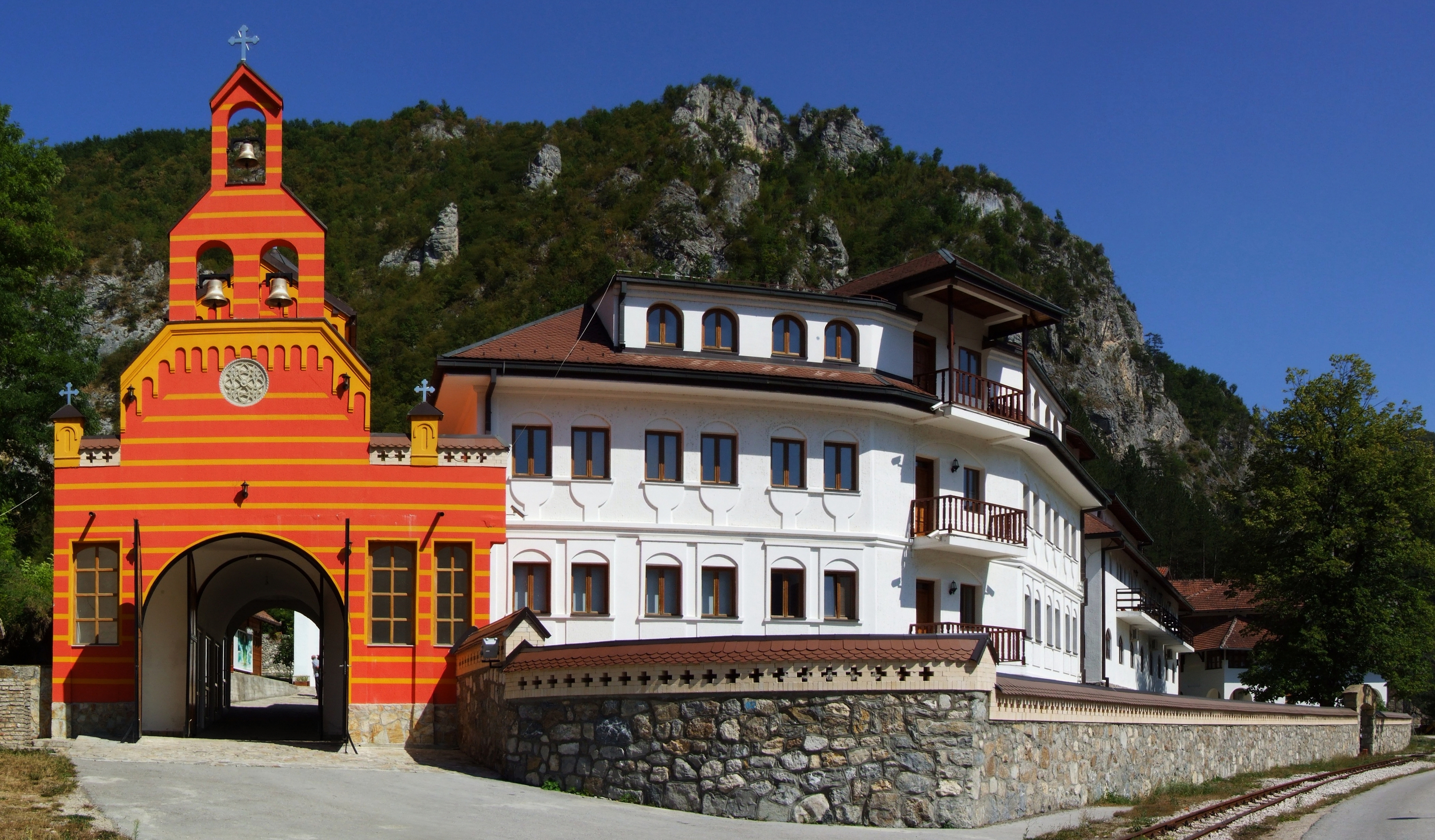
Dobrun Monastery

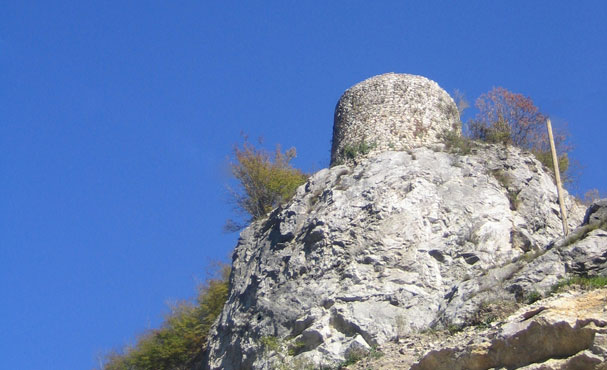
Prince Marko's tower

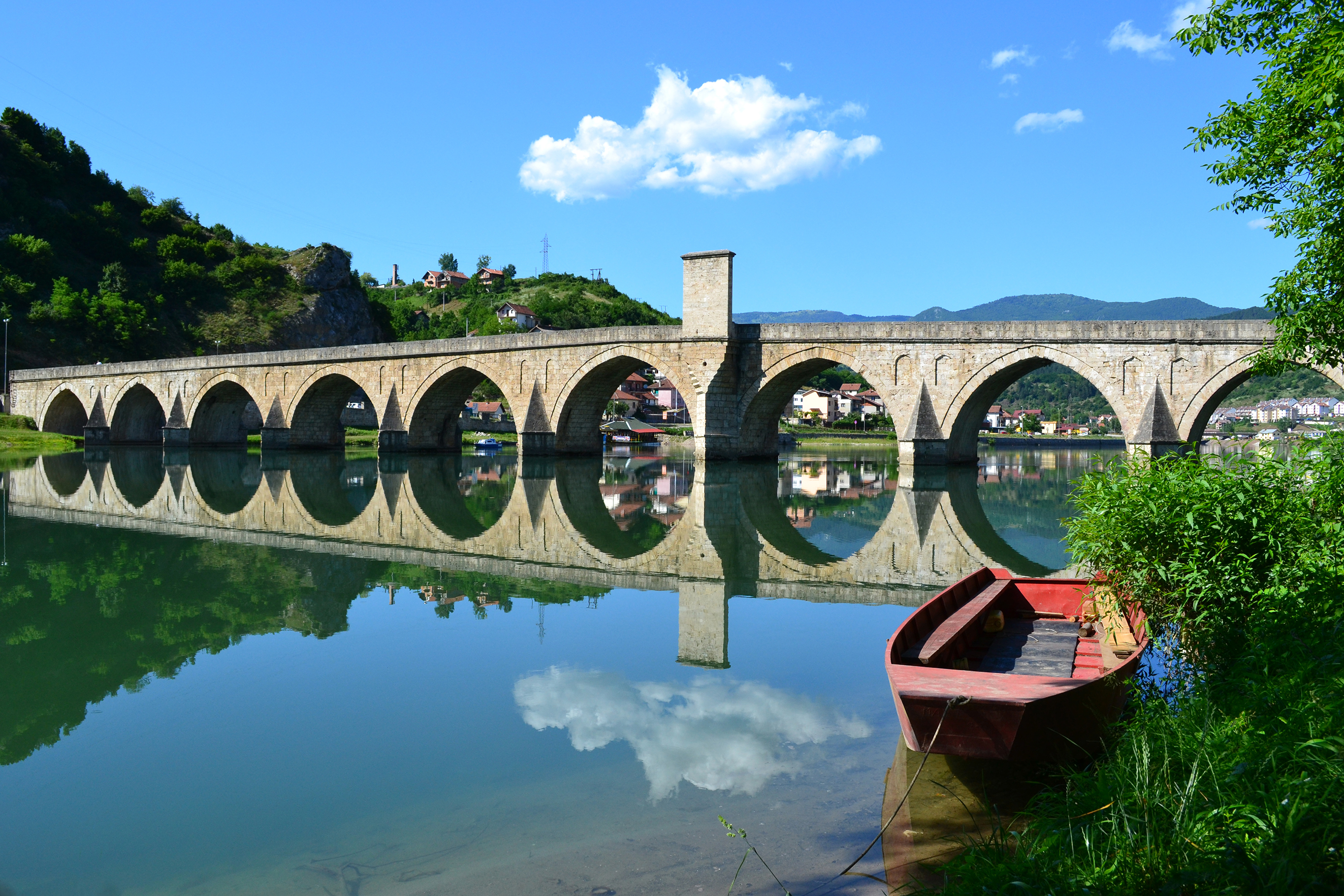
Mehmed Paša Sokolović Bridge on the River Drina

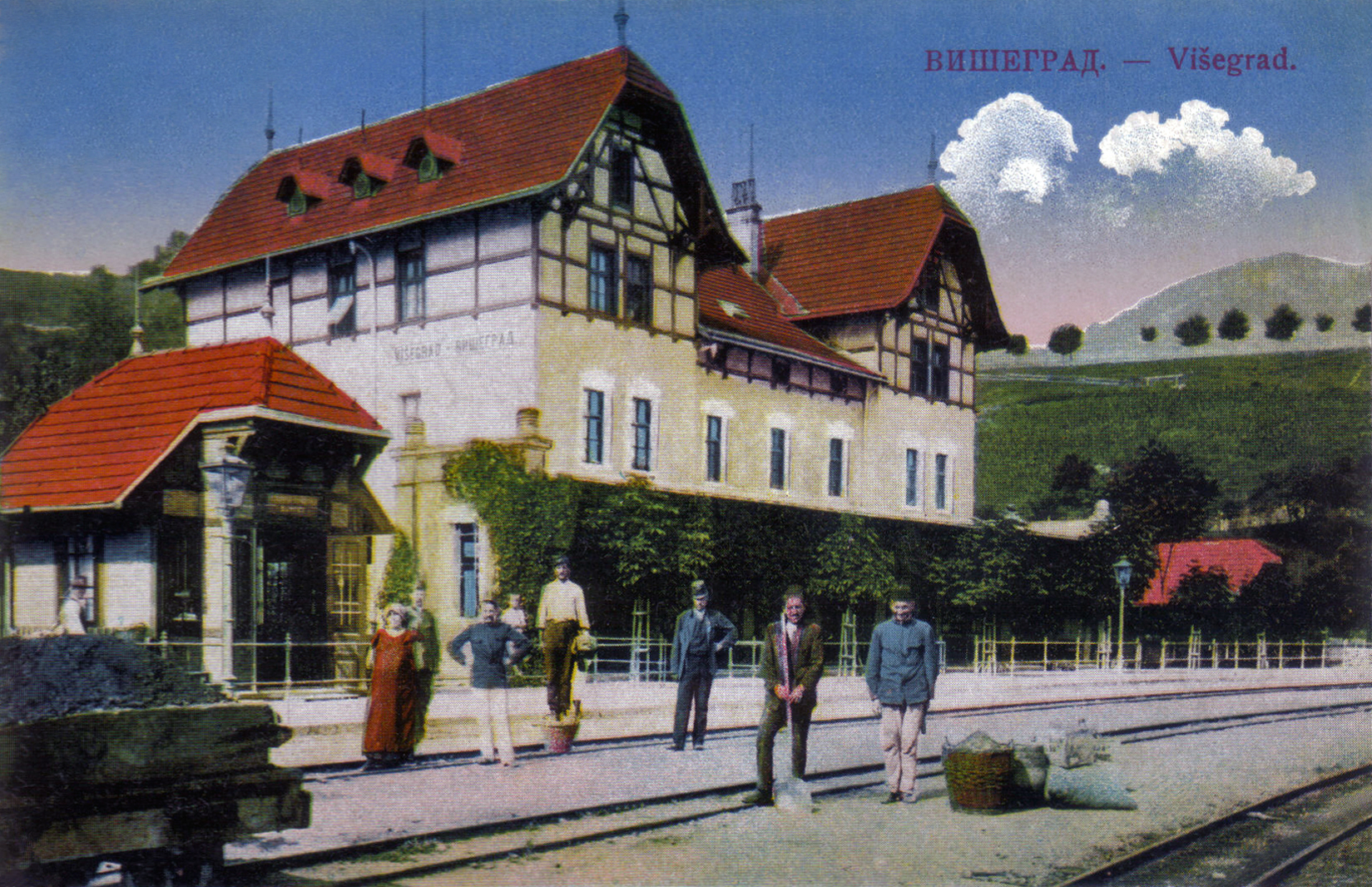
Višegrad railway station in 1906

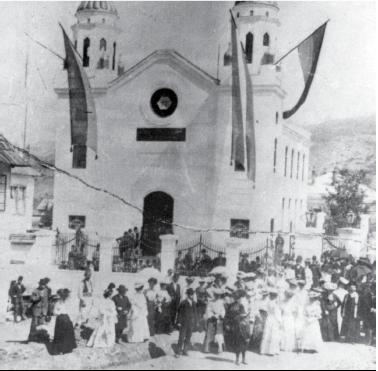
Višegrad Synagogue, 1905

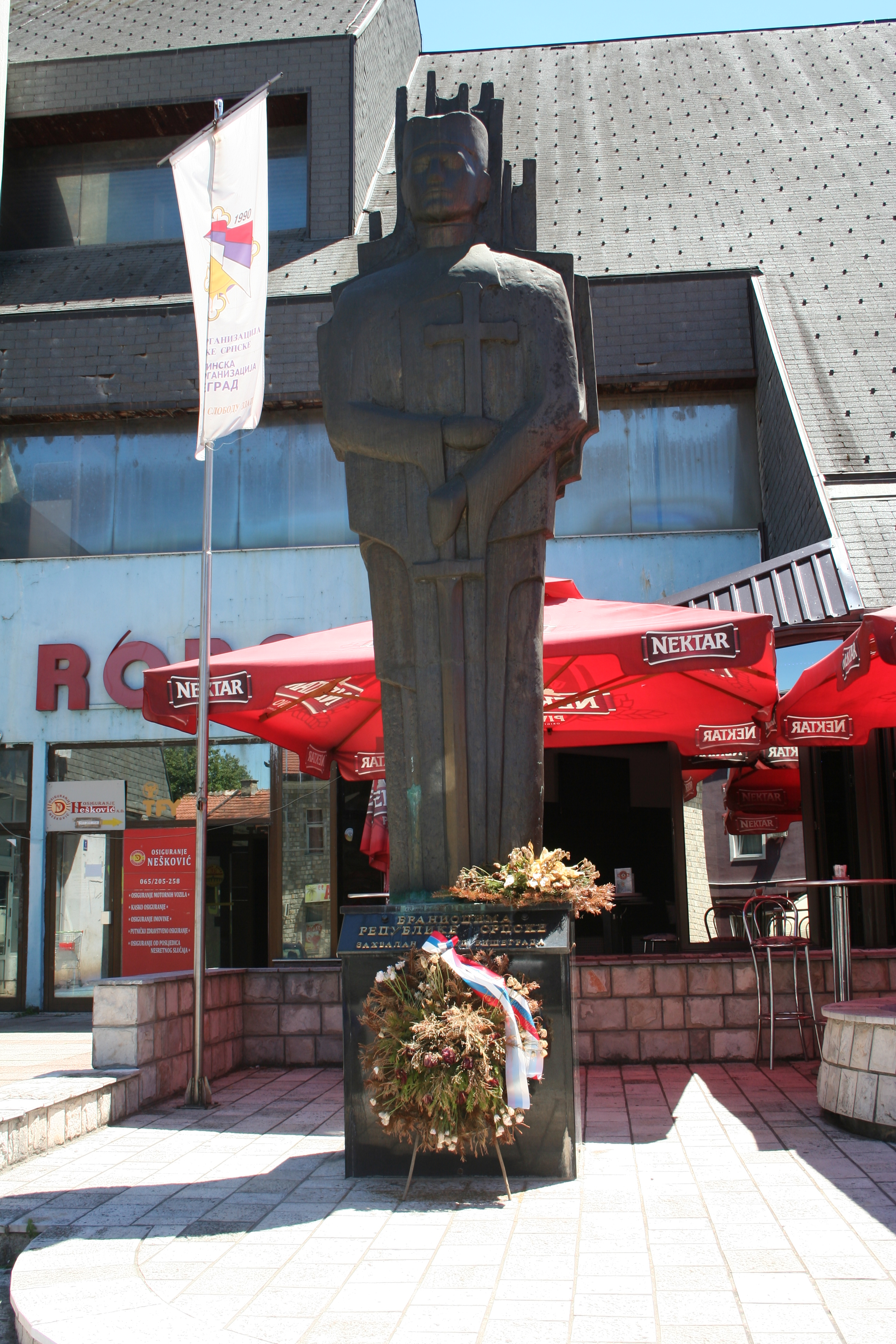
Monument dedicated to the fallen soldiers of the Bosnian Serb Army

== Demographics ==
=== Population ===
Population of settlements – Višegrad municipality
| | Settlement | 1879. | 1885. | 1895. | 1910. | 1921. | 1931. | 1948. | 1953. | 1961. | 1971. | 1981. | 1991. | 2013. |
| | Total | 12,118 | 14,561 | 18,171 | 24,350 | 21,333 | 28,425 | 29,897 | 36,742 | | 25,389 | 23,201 | 21,199 | 10,668 |
| 1 | Donja Crnča | | | | | | | | | | | | 907 | 491 |
| 2 | Dušče | | | | | | | | | | | | 841 | 323 |
| 3 | Kosovo Polje | | | | | | | | | | | | 167 | 546 |
| 4 | Šeganje | | | | | | | | | | | | 308 | 283 |
| 5 | Višegrad | | | | | | | | | | 4,866 | 5,988 | 6,902 | 5,869 |
| 6 | Vučine | | | | | | | | | | | | 151 | 257 |

=== Ethnic composition ===
Ethnic composition – Višegrad town
| | 2013. | 1991. | 1981. | 1971. |
| Total | 5,869 (100,0%) | 6,902 (100,0%) | 5,988 (100,0%) | 4,866 (100,0%) |
| Bosniaks | | 3,463 (50,17%) | 2,854 (47,66%) | 2,429 (49,92%) |
| Serbs | | 2,619 (37,95%) | 2,446 (40,85%) | 2,141 (44,00%) |
| Others | | 527 (7,635%) | 23 (0,384%) | 31 (0,637%) |
| Yugoslavs | | 270 (3,912%) | 518 (8,651%) | 107 (2,199%) |
| Croats | | 23 (0,333%) | 52 (0,868%) | 53 (1,089%) |
| Montenegrins | | | 76 (1,269%) | 94 (1,932%) |
| Albanians | | | 10 (0,167%) | 7 (0,144%) |
| Macedonians | | | 6 (0,100%) | 2 (0,041%) |
| Slovenes | | | 3 (0,050%) | 2 (0,041%) |

Ethnic composition – Višegrad municipality
| | 2013. | 1991. | 1981. | 1971. |
| Total | 10,668 (100,0%) | 21,199 (100,0%) | 23,201 (100,0%) | 25,389 (100,0%) |
| Serbs | 9,338 (87,53%) | 6,743 (31,81%) | 7,648 (32,96%) | 9,225 (36,33%) |
| Bosniaks | 1,043 (9,777%) | 13,471 (63,55%) | 14,397 (62,05%) | 15,752 (62,04%) |
| Others | 254 (2,381%) | 634 (2,991%) | 127 (0,547%) | 77 (0,303%) |
| Croats | 33 (0,309%) | 32 (0,151%) | 60 (0,259%) | 68 (0,268%) |
| Yugoslavs | | 319 (1,505%) | 858 (3,698%) | 141 (0,555%) |
| Montenegrins | | | 86 (0,371%) | 106 (0,418%) |
| Albanians | | | 15 (0,065%) | 15 (0,059%) |
| Macedonians | | | 6 (0,026%) | 3 (0,012%) |
| Slovenes | | | 4 (0,017%) | 2 (0,008%) |

== Economy ==
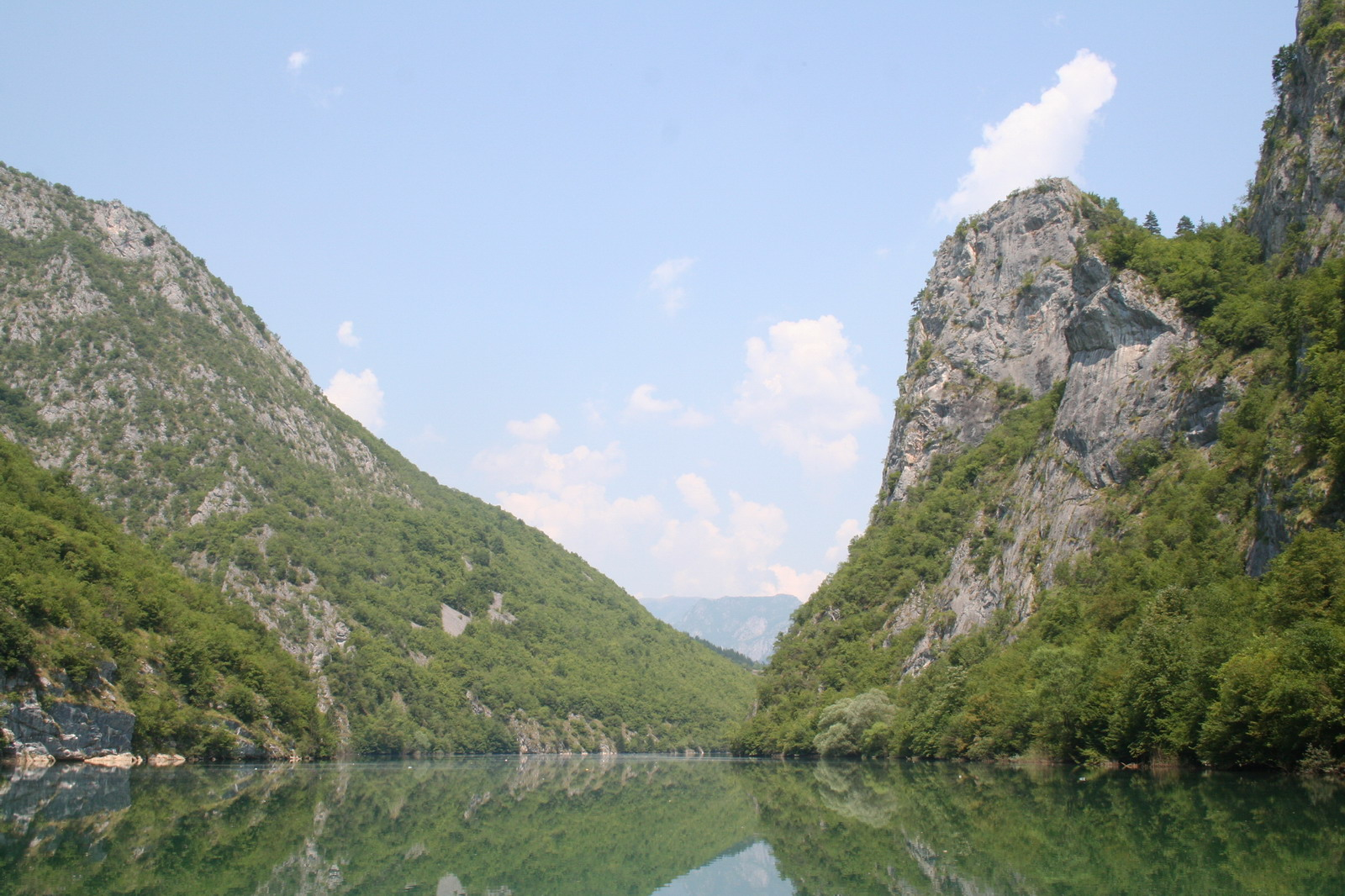
Drina near Višegrad

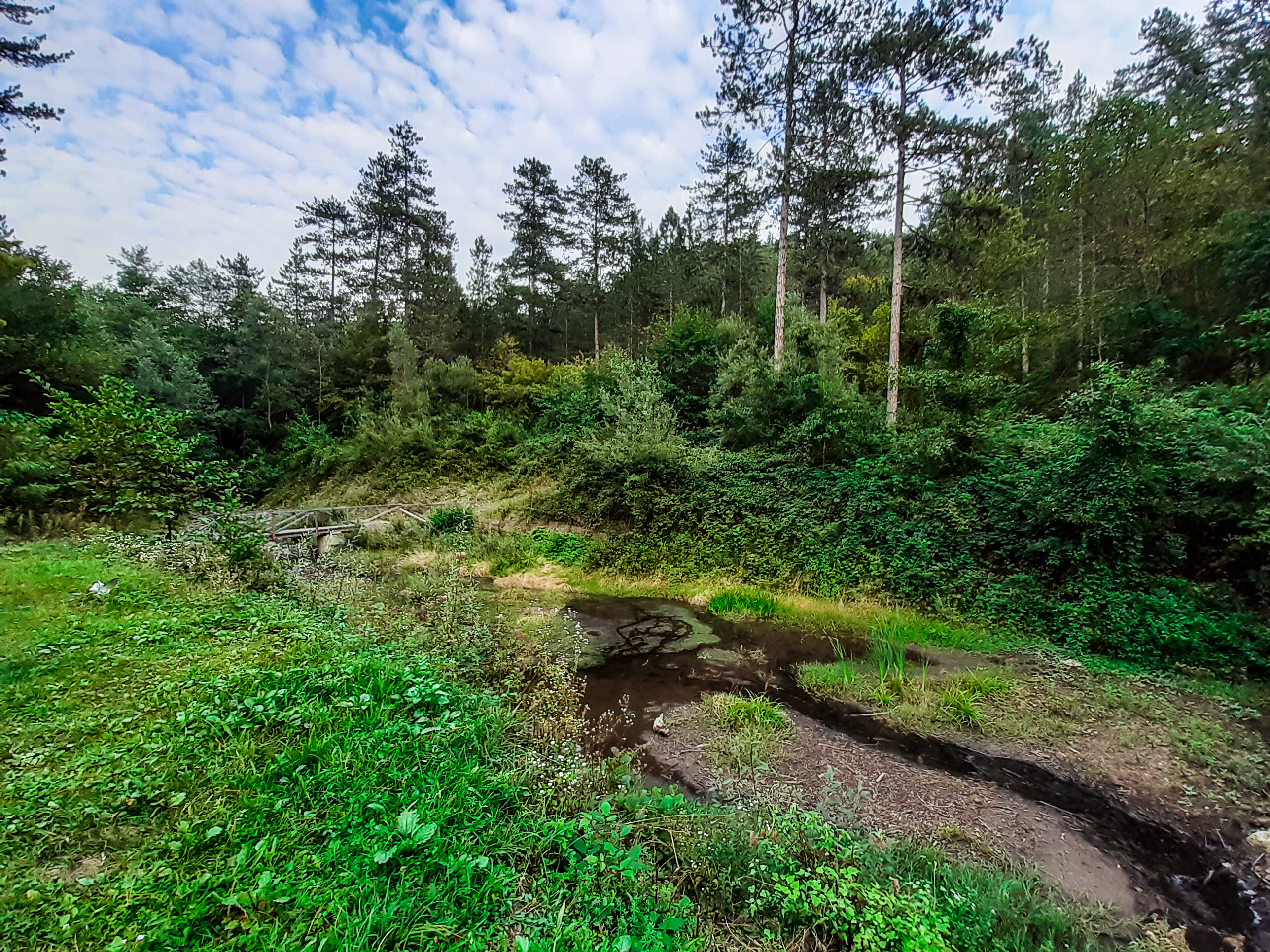
Forrest complex, a part of Višegrad spa

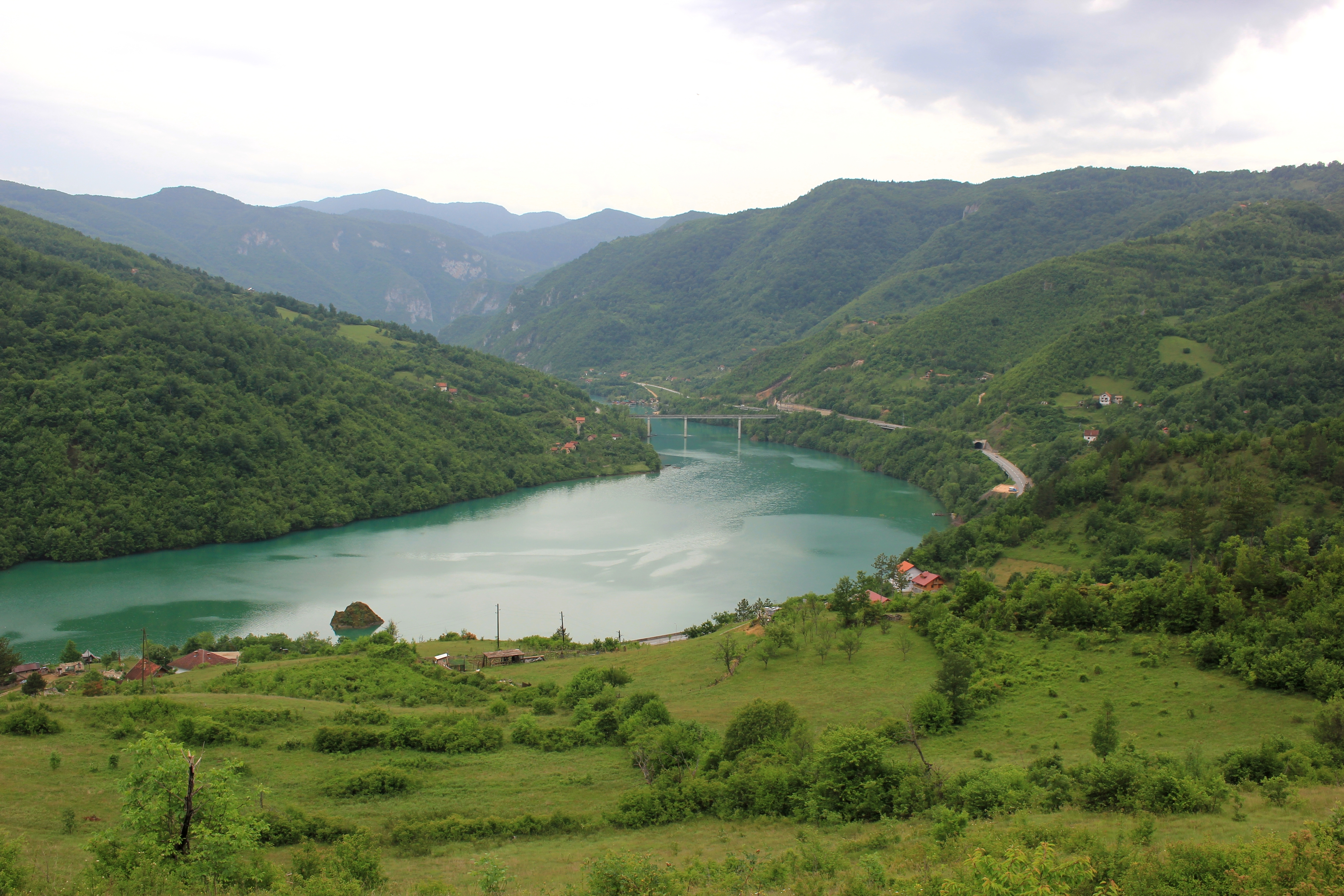
Međeđa

The following table gives a preview of total number of registered people employed in professional fields per their core activity (as of 2018):

| Professional fields | Total |
|---|---|
| Agriculture, forestry and fishing | 138 |
| Mining and quarrying | - |
| Manufacturing | 259 |
| Electricity, gas, steam and air conditioning supply | 377 |
| Water supply; sewerage, waste management and remediation activities | 77 |
| Construction | 7 |
| Wholesale and retail trade, repair of motor vehicles and motorcycles | 199 |
| Transportation and storage | 64 |
| Accommodation and food services | 210 |
| Information and communication | 28 |
| Financial and insurance activities | 23 |
| Real estate activities | - |
| Professional, scientific and technical activities | 28 |
| Administrative and support service activities | - |
| Public administration and defense; compulsory social security | 284 |
| Education | 142 |
| Human health and social work activities | 165 |
| Arts, entertainment and recreation | 20 |
| Other service activities | 29 |
| Total | 2,050 |

== Culture ==
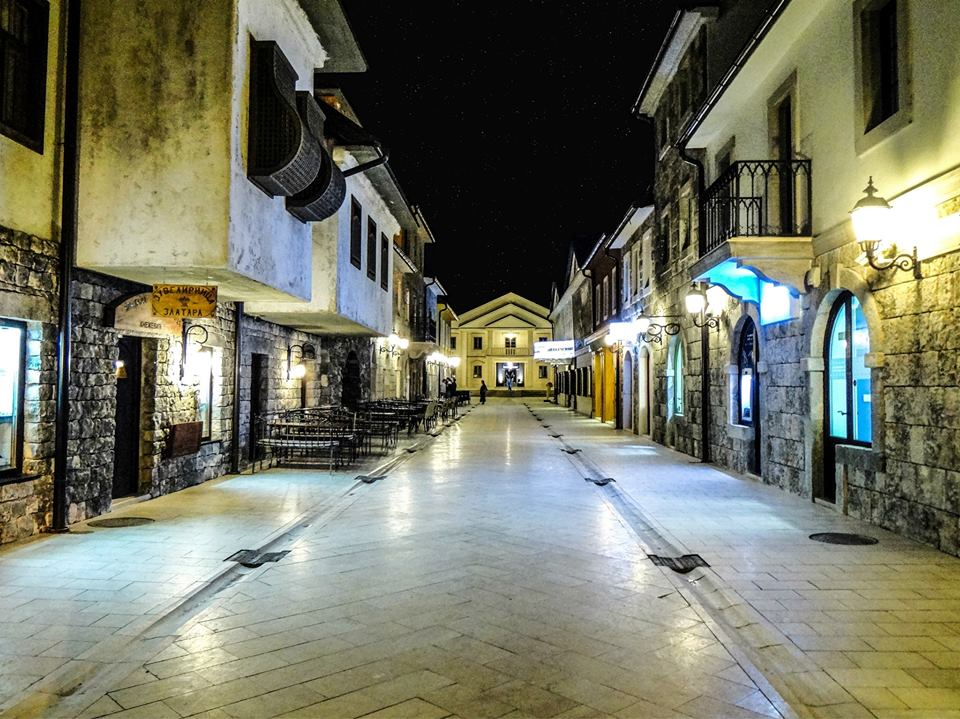
Inside Andrićgrad

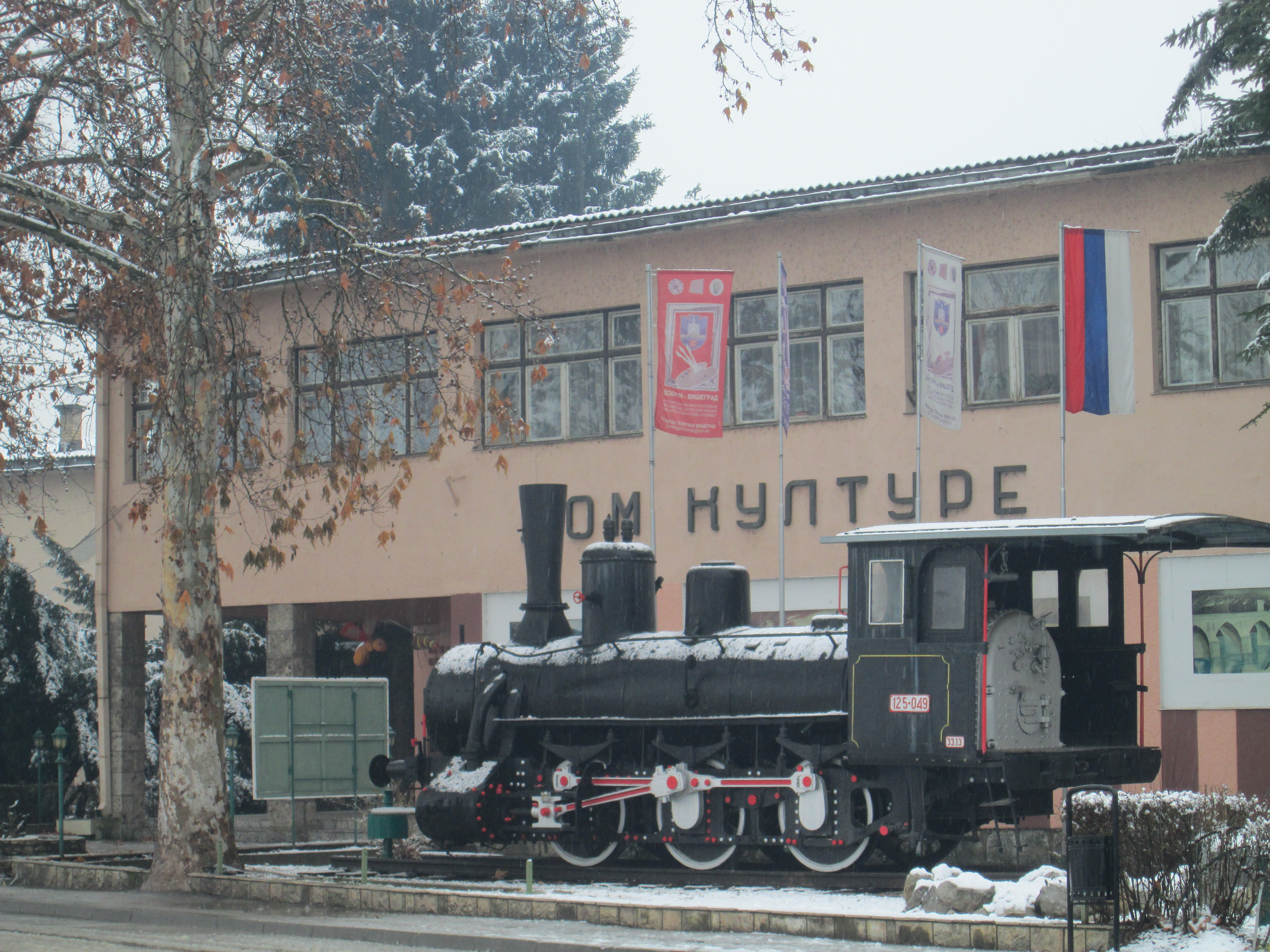
The House of Culture

Andrićgrad, a town built by filmmaker Emir Kusturica that is dedicated to Ivo Andrić, was officially opened on 28 June 2014. The House of Culture was founded in 1953. Film screenings and other cultural activities take place in there, including amateur drama programs. The City Gallery, which was opened in 1996, is located in the House of Culture. There is also a folk dance ensemble operating in Višegrad under the name KUD "Bikavac".

== Religion ==
The Serbian Orthodox Dobrun Monastery is one of the most notable monasteries of Bosnia and Herzegovina.

== Sports ==
Višegrad is also known for various sports clubs. The local football club is FK Drina HE Višegrad, which competes in the 2nd League of Republika Srpska. In its long history, (1924-2024) the club played different seasons in the 1st League of Republika Srpska.

KK Varda is a basketball club from Višegrad, currently playing in the 1st League of Republika Srpska, having also had good seasons in the Premier League of Bosnia and Herzegovina.

The only women's club in the city is OK HE na Drini, a volleyball club with a long history, having played in the Premier League of Bosnia and Herzegovina, the 1st League of Republika Srpska and the 2nd League of Republika Srpska.

Other sports clubs are Handball Club Višegrad, founded in 2002, currently playing in the 1st League of Republika Srpska.

== Notable people ==
- Đorđe Okuka (born 1996) - footballer

== Sources ==
- Stjepo Trifković (1903). Višegradski Stari Vlah. Srpska kraljevska akademija.
