= Ljubica Adžović =

Romani actress

Ljubica Adžović (born c. 1924–1930 – died 23 May 2006) was a Romani actress, known for her roles in Emir Kusturica's films: Time of the Gypsies (1989), and Black Cat, White Cat (1998).

== Early life ==
Adžović was the daughter of Pašo Adžović and Rukija Adžović (née Selimović), a Roma couple who moved to Montenegro from Bosnia (then Yugoslavia). Pašo and Rukija led a nomadic lifestyle, and depending on the season and financial situation, they would relocate, pitching their tent across the country's coast. Ljubica was born during one of these relocations, in a meadow in Zupci (Bar).

On the web and in film encyclopedia, Adžović is said to have been born in 1924, in Skopje, North Macedonia. However, the birthplace is incorrect and her exact birth date is unknown.

In a 2018 interview with writer Željko Milović, Adžović's daughter Nada reported that her mother was born in Zupci (Bar) in 1930, emphasizing that the birthplace and date "Skopje, 1924" were false statements, which circulated from the time of the production of Black Cat, White Cat, since most Roma actors came from Skopje. Adžović herself confirmed her birthplace to be Bar in two interviews, which she gave to ex-Yugoslavian periodicals before and after the release of her first movie: in a 1987 article by the Sarajevo magazine VEN, about the start of the filming of Time of the Gypsies, and in 1989, by the women's magazine Una, where she claimed to have always lived in Bar.

Although these accounts agree about her exact birthplace, they disagree about her birth date: while Adžović's daughter Nada claimed that her mother was born in 1930, Adžović herself stated in both VEN (1987) and Una (1989) magazines to be 60 years old, which implies that she might have been born between 1926 and 1929.

== Private life ==
Throughout her life, Adžović married twice and had nine children. Her first husband was Hakija, with whom she had one daughter, Nada. Her second husband was Spaho, with whom she had seven sons –Čedo, Šućo, Džemo, Grujo, Danilo, Veis, Đango, and one daughter –Jadranka. "Money and children are never too much. If you can have them, have ten. They'll be fed, don't worry", she would say.

Adžović exhibited a profound emotional attachment to her children and grandchildren, as well as to music and her hometown in Bar, reflecting a deep sense of personal connection and loyalty to the people in her life: "My little birds! I bathed every one of them when they were born. I put herbs in the water so they'd be strong. And thank God, they are. They're not afraid of the winter or the cold, even though they're naked and barefoot", she would once comment about her children and grandchildren.

About her passions, other than children, Adžović once replied: "Music and cassettes. I put a cassette in, and my heart dances. When my son Danilo plays the accordion, I immediately grab someone to dance with. [...] I love Safet Isović the most. No one will ever sing sevdalinke like he did. [...] I wouldn't trade Bar for America. [...] I was born here, I grew up here, and I believe I'll die here. I tell you, I can't live without Bar".

Until the late '80s, Ljubica Adžović made a living by begging and fortune telling on the beaches during summer, and in the city centers around Bar during the other months of the year.

== Public visibility ==
Her story gained public visibility in January 1987, when she was interviewed by journalist Jovan Plamenac for the newspaper Barske Novine.

In his article, which focused on the Roma families that settled in Zagrađe after the 1979 Montenegro earthquake, Adžović spoke openly about herself and her family. "I can't stand begging anymore. Everything is so expensive. I'm ashamed now when I have to ask someone: give me some potatoes, give me this, give me that. It's embarrassing for me now [...] I was in Italy, and there they pretend to be blind, crippled, paralyzed, just to beg [...] I didn't want to do that. I stayed with my uncle for three or four days, then I came back to my Yugoslavia. Here, I go to a door. I knock, and they say, Ljubica, is that you? Yes, it's me. Come in. They immediately make me coffee, give me potatoes, sugar, they help me".

Adžović continued, explaining the idiosyncrasies of Roma life, their beliefs, celebrations, and the relationships between children and adults. She described how in their family they love to eat kastradina (salted and dried mutton) with chicken; how men do tinning and mend kettles, while the daughters-in-law beg and clean.

The article ended stating that, even though Adžović was illiterate, her words and personality radiated a "unique life philosophy".

Reflecting on Adžović's interview, Plamenac would later state: "I was immediately taken by her warmth and straightforwardness. When I heard that Kusturica was looking for a Romani woman for 'Dom...' [Dom za vješanje — Time of the Gypsies], I sent her picture through a man from Sarajevo. They say Kusturica liked her right away".

== Acting career ==
The publication of Ljubica Adžović's interview on Barske Novine (22 January 1987) caught the attention of Emir Kusturica's film crew, who were seeking non-professional actors for his film Time of the Gypsies. Later that summer, the film crew traveled to locate her, ultimately finding Adžović in a vineyard in Suvi Potok, near Sutomore. This encounter marked the beginning of her unexpected acting career.

In an interview published by the Sarajevo magazine VEN during the filming of Time of the Gypsies, Adžović reflected on the sudden change in her life: "He [Emir Kusturica] liked me, and overnight, I became an actress. I'm illiterate, but that's not a problem –I learn the text by heart. I might even make some money, because I am a poor woman. I feed nine children with social assistance of only three million and eight hundred thousand dinars. You ask where we live? In a wooden house, smaller than the one used in the film. That's why the children say, 'Go play, mother, earn some dinars so we can fix the roof over our heads'".

In Time of the Gypsies (1989), Ljubica Adžović played Khatidža, the village healer and grandmother who raises the main character Perhan (Davor Dujmović).

Later, in 1989 Adžović returned to her life in Bar and her original occupation as a fortune teller on the beaches of Sutomore. Besides starring in a television commercial for Point cigarettes, the tobacco company of Titograd, Adžović declined to work with other film directors. She only returned to the big screen 10 years later in Emir Kusturica's Black Cat, White Cat, where she played a similar role, this time as Šujka: the grandmother of main character Ida (Branka Katić).

After her second movie, Adžović returned again to Bar, where she paraded through town in a white Mercedes, dressed in festive attire, and welcoming guests to her new house in Zagrađe, whose Bar Municipality had provided the land, water, and electricity. In Bar, Adžović continued fortune telling every day for tourists and passersby between the beaches of Sutomore and Budva.

In a 1998 interview for Barske Novine, Adžović stated: "From this new film, I earned 5,000 marks and furnished a bathroom; it meant a lot to me. I also received a vacuum cleaner, a washing machine, and a television. Director Zoran Janković was incredibly generous; he paid for everything. But last time, from Time of the Gypsies, Mirza Pašić only gave me 600 dinars. And Kusto [Emir Kusturica] treated me like his own son. He gave me the script, and I understood it, I knew it, and for longer scenes, he'd break them into two parts. I finished my scenes right away, then went off to the side to smoke".

Her performances as the Romani grandmother in Time of the Gypsies (1989) and Black Cat, White Cat (1998), established her as the most famous self-taught actress of former Yugoslavia.

== Later life ==
According to the newspaper Glas Javnosti, later in 1998 Adžović left Montenegro to live and work in Sweden. In 1999, however, Adžović was featured in the French press, seeking asylum in the Rhône region and citing death threats from the mafia as the reason for her flight. According to her testimony to the French authorities, the mafia had extorted money from her and destroyed her home in Montenegro. Adžović stated that she had traveled to Lyon via Italy and Albania, seeking refuge in France with the hope of securing "water, bread, and a house to live in peace".

Her whereabouts outside of Montenegro are however unclear: in a 2018 interview with writer Željko Milović, Adžović's daughter Nada denied these "fabricated newspaper stories", claiming that her mother was "traveling in France and elsewhere in Europe to visit her sons and daughter"; while in Sweden, she "fell gravely ill" and "returned to Zagrađe through Germany and France".

After returning to Montenegro in 2005, she died on May 23, 2006, following a brief illness. Upon her death, Kusturica expressed profound sadness, noting that working with her on Time of the Gypsies and Black Cat, White Cat were among the most thrilling experiences of his career. He described Adžović as a unique talent, stating that every scene they filmed together was an invaluable experience for him as a director.

She was buried in the Belvedere cemetery of Stari Bar.

== Filmography ==
Year	Title	Role
1989	Time of the Gypsies	Khatidža, the healer and grandmother of main character Perhan (Davor Dujmović)
1998	Black Cat, White Cat	Šujka, the grandmother of main character Ida (Branka Katić)

== Accolades and recognition ==
In an article for Politika, film co-screenwriter and translator Rajko Đurić described Adžović as a "unique phenomenon", recounting what it was to shoot with her: "In August 1987, the role of Hatidža [Khatidža], Mother Tidža, had not yet been cast. Besides Ljubica, other contenders included her daughter-in-law Olga, Ljubica's acquaintance from Titograd, Silvana, and an elderly woman from Vranje. In the screen test, each had to say a line or two from the script. By chance, Ljubica was last. I remember she was given a line –a conversation with Ahmed (Bora Todorović)– which didn't make it to the final film edit but was kept for the TV series [...]: 'After this bee, there will be honey; after you, there will be dung'. [...] After delivering the line brilliantly, Ljubica joked, 'I've passed'. She took off her large straw hat and added, 'The hat drinks, the hat pays! Roma, strong as thunder!' We all burst out laughing. Together with Kusturica, we realized that the test was over and the role would be given to Ljubica".

Kusturica himself praised Adžović's emotional depth, noting that after few screen tests, she achieved the level of performance he envisioned for the role of grandmother in Time of the Gypsies. Despite her lack of formal training, Adžović's inexperience in front of the camera lent a natural authenticity to her portrayals, enhancing the realism of her characters.

During the premiere of Time of the Gypsies at the May 1989 Cannes Film Festival, Adžović appeared alongside Kusturica and the entire cast, receiving prolonged applause on screen and in person. On the terrace of the Majestic Hotel, the trumpeters played traditional Vranje dance music, and Adžović performed the Čoček, joined later in the dances by Grace Jones, Greta Scacchi, and Cecil de Louis.

Time of the Gypsies (1989) won Emir Kusturica the award for Best Director and a nomination for the Palme d'Or, while Black Cat, White Cat (1998) won Emir Kusturica the Silver Lion at the Venice Film Festival and the audience award in Tallinn, Estonia.

== Controversies ==
In 2006, shortly before her death, Ljubica Adžović was mistakenly implicated in a child trafficking case. This accusation was the result of an error by the Tanjug news agency, which had confused her with another person of the same name. The allegation was subsequently proven to be unfounded.
