= List of actors who have appeared in multiple Palme d'Or winners =

The following is a list of actors who have appeared in multiple Palme d'Or winners. The Palme d'Or is awarded every year since 1955 to the best film at the Cannes Film Festival and is widely regarded as one of the film industry's most prestigious prizes.

Actor	Number	Palme d'Or winners	Notes
Robert Duvall	3	M*A*S*H (1970), The Conversation (1974), Apocalypse Now ° (1979)	° Oscar nominee
Max von Sydow	3	Miss Julie (1951), Pelle the Conqueror ° (1987), The Best Intentions (1992)	° Oscar nominee
Harvey Keitel	3	Taxi Driver (1976), The Piano (1993), Pulp Fiction (1994)	Oscar nominee
Mitsuko Baisho	3	Kagemusha (1980), The Ballad of Narayama (1983), The Eel (1997)	
Orson Welles	2	The Third Man (1949), Othello (1951)	
Anouk Aimée	2	La Dolce Vita (1960), A Man and a Woman ° (1966)	° Oscar nominee
Sarah Miles	2	Blowup (1967), The Hireling (1973)	
Gene Hackman	2	Scarecrow (1973), The Conversation (1974)	Oscar nominee
Harrison Ford	2	The Conversation (1974), Apocalypse Now (1979)	Oscar nominee
Frederic Forrest	2	The Conversation (1974), Apocalypse Now (1979)	
Robert De Niro	2	Taxi Driver ° (1976), The Mission (1986)	° Oscar nominee
Harry Dean Stanton	2	Paris, Texas (1984), Wild at Heart (1990)	
John Lurie	2	Paris, Texas (1984), Wild at Heart (1990)	
Anita Björk	2	Miss Julie (1951), The Best Intentions (1992)	
Björn Granath	2	Pelle the Conqueror (1987), The Best Intentions (1992)	
Steve Buscemi	2	Barton Fink (1991), Pulp Fiction (1994)	
Davor Dujmović	2	When Father Was Away on Business (1985), Underground (1995)	
Miki Manojlović	2	When Father Was Away on Business (1985), Underground (1995)	
Mirjana Karanović	2	When Father Was Away on Business (1985), Underground (1995)	
Sanshō Shinsui	2	The Ballad of Narayama (1983), The Eel (1997)	
Shoichi Ozawa	2	The Ballad of Narayama (1983), The Eel (1997)	
Catherine Deneuve	2	The Umbrellas of Cherbourg (1964), Dancer in the Dark (2000)	
Nanni Moretti	2	Padre Padrone (1977), The Son's Room (2001)	
Fabrizio Rongione	2	Rosetta (1999), L'Enfant (2005)	
Olivier Gourmet	2	Rosetta (1999), L'Enfant (2005)	
Ernst Jacobi	2	The Tin Drum (1979), The White Ribbon (2009)	
Jean-Louis Trintignant	2	A Man and a Woman (1966), Amour (2012)	
Akira Emoto	2	The Eel (1997), Shoplifters (2018)	
