= Black Cat, White Cat =

1998 Serbian film

- DVD cover
- Directed by: Emir Kusturica
- Written by: Gordan Mihić
- Produced by: Karl Baumgartner
- Starring: Bajram Severdžan; Srđan Todorović; Branka Katić; Florijan Ajdini; Ljubica Adžović; Zabit Memedov; Sabri Sulejmani; Jašar Destani; Stojan Sotirov; Predrag-Pepi Laković; Predrag-Miki Manojlović
- Cinematography: Thierry Arbogast
- Edited by: Svetolik-Mića Zajc
- Music by: Dr. Nelle Karajlić; Vojislav Aralica; Dejan Sparavalo
- Production companies: Ciby 2000; Pandora Film; Komuna; France 2 Cinéma
- Distributed by: AFMD (France); Arthaus Filmverleih (Germany); Komuna (FR Yugoslavia)
- Release dates: 1 June 1998 (FR Yugoslavia); 30 September 1998 (France); 28 January 1999 (Germany)
- Running time: 135 min.
- Countries: FR Yugoslavia; France; Germany
- Languages: Romani; Serbian; Bulgarian
- Budget: $4.5 million
- Box office: $351,447 (North America)

Black Cat, White Cat (Serbian: Црна мачка, бели мачор, romanized: Crna mačka, beli mačor) is a 1998 Serbian romantic black comedy crime film directed by Emir Kusturica. It won the Silver Lion for Best Direction at the Venice Film Festival.

The literal translation of the title is actually "Black queen cat, white tomcat". The movie characters speak in Romani, Serbian, and Bulgarian— frequently switching among them.

== Plot ==
Matko Destanov, a small-time Romani smuggler and profiteer, lives with his teenage son Zare in a ramshackle house by the Danube River in eastern Serbia near the Bulgarian border. He has plans to steal a whole train of smuggled fuel. To obtain a loan that would subsidize the heist, he visits Grga Pitić, a wheelchair-using old gangster, who is an old friend of Zarije Destanov, Matko's father and Zare's grandfather. Matko plots the details of the job with an ally named Dadan, a rich, fun-living, drug-snorting gangster who has a harem, juggles grenades, and cheats at gambling. However, Dadan double-crosses him and glitches up the deal by giving Matko a drink that is drugged, and carrying out the job while Matko is unconscious. Matko is unable to repay his loan, so Dadan makes a deal whereby he would forgive the debt if Zare marries Afrodita, Dadan's dwarf sister. However, Zare (17) is in love with Ida (26), a barmaid who works in an establishment run by her Roma grandmother Sujka, and Afrodita is waiting for the man of her dreams. Dadan coerces Afrodita into marrying by dunking her in a well, while Zare first learns of the scheme to marry him off from Ida, who has overheard Dadan and Matko plotting it in the restaurant where she works. Meanwhile, Zare retrieves Zarije from the hospital where he is being kept, with the aid of a gypsy band. Grga Pitić is having problems of his own, as he wants his grandsons, including the 2.00m giant Grga Veliki, to get married.

The two reluctantly endure the wedding ceremony held at Matko's house, which Dadan refuses to postpone despite the sudden apparent death of Zarije. They were not supposed to have a wedding while in mourning, but Dadan decides to delay the death announcement, so Matko and Zare hide Zarije's body in the attic, packed in ice. Ida and Sujka provide the catering for the wedding, and Ida is upset at seeing her beloved married to someone else. However, the bride runs away mid-ceremony, pursued by Dadan, Matko and Dadan's criminal cronies. Meanwhile, Grga Veliki is driving his father and brother to Matko's house so that they may visit Zarije's grave (Grga Pitić and Zarije are old friends). The fleeing bride stumbles across Grga Veliki, and the couple fall instantly in love. Grga Pitić arrives on the scene, after his wheelchair had fallen out the back of the truck and rolled downhill, and he is delighted that Grga Veliki has found his mate. The old gangster forces Dadan, who had once worked for him, to accept the match.

The groom conspires with Sujka and Ida to bring Dadan down a peg, and rigs the outhouse toilet so that the seat will come apart. While the preparations for the wedding ceremony of Afrodita and Grga Veliki are being conducted, Matko and Dadan pass the time by playing dice, with Dadan cheating. Sujka comes in during the game, and serves the unsuspecting Dadan a drink spiked with a laxative. Grga Pitić apparently dies, and Dadan and Matko hide his body in the attic, where Zarije's body is also hidden. However, the two corpses soon both come back to life; they were not dead after all. They are surprised to find themselves together, as they had not seen each other for 25 years and each had thought the other was dead. During the ceremony, Dadan starts to feel uncomfortable and rushes into the outhouse, only to fall into the manure. His harem and cronies desert him, and as he tries to clean himself off on a goose, only Matko remains loyal, and he provides Dadan with a shower from the garden hose. Zare grabs the wedding official at gunpoint and orders him to solemnize his marriage with his sweetheart, Ida, and the two sail off together on a riverboat set for Bulgaria with a fistful of cash stashed in his grandfather's accordion, the blessing of their respective grandparents and, as witnesses, a black cat and a white cat.

== Cast ==
- Bajram Severdžan as Matko Destanov
- Srđan Todorović as Dadan Karambolo
- Branka Katić as Ida Batok
- Florijan Ajdini as Zare Destanov
- Ljubica Adžović as Šujka Batok
- Zabit Memedov as Zarije Destanov
- Sabri Sulejmani as Grga Pitić
- Jašar Destani as Grga Veliki
- Salija Ibraimova as Afrodita "Ladybird" Karambolo
- Stojan Sotirov as Bulgarian customs officer
- Zdena Hurtečakova as The Black Obelisk
- Adnan Bekir as Grga Mali
- Predrag Laković as priest #1
- Miki Manojlović as priest #2
- Irfan Jagli as Dadan's bodyguard #1
- Ašim Džemaili as Dadan's bodyguard #2
- Šećo Ćerimi as Dadan's chauffeur/bodyguard #3
- Nebojša Krstajić as Grga Pitić's bodyguard #1
- Safet Denaj as Grga Pitić's bodyguard #2
- Minaza Alijević as Dadan's sister #1
- Javorka Asanović as Dadan's sister #2
- Nena Kostić as Dadan's sister #3

== Production ==
In the aftermath of the worldwide success, as well as the controversy, of his previous Palme d'Or-winning film Underground, Kusturica was so hurt by the aggressive criticism coming from several French intellectuals that he publicly announced his retirement from movies at the age of 41.

He later changed his mind, deciding to come back with a project on Gypsy music which he originally envisioned as a documentary with a working title Musika Akrobatika. The idea further evolved and Kusturica decided to add narrative flourishes of his own, so Musika Akrobatika got transformed into a fictional feature Black Cat, White Cat.

The vehicle driven by Zare Destanov (Florijan Ajdini) is a 1966 Renault Caravelle.

One of Dadan's cronies is invariably seen reading the Italian comic Alan Ford, which became very popular in the Balkans.

== Reception ==
Black Cat, White Cat received a positive response from critics overall. On the review aggregator website Rotten Tomatoes, 82% of 34 critics' reviews are positive, with an average rating of 7.1/10. The website's consensus reads: "Rambling and eccentric, Emir Kusturica's comedy captures the life and energy of the Gypsy family at the heart of the tale." Metacritic, which uses a weighted average, assigned the film a score of 73 out of 100, based on 21 critics, indicating "generally favorable" reviews.

Janet Maslin of The New York Times wrote a positive review, summing the film up as "a mad scramble through the Felliniesque realm of Mr. Kusturica's imagination". She further praised Srđan Todorović's portrayal of Dadan Karambolo as "a repetitive but irresistible turn" before concluding that "Mr. Kusturica so evidently adores all of the film's other characters that Black Cat, White Cat becomes a wild, warts-and-all celebration of their lives and like Fellini, Kusturica finds true grace where it's least expected and makes films utterly, uncompromisingly his own".

In his review for the Los Angeles Times, Kevin Thomas refers to the film as a "raucous, knockabout comedy, a paean to love, freedom and friendship", before concluding that despite being two hours and nine minutes long, Black Cat, White Cat "gets away with it better than most over-long movies due to its beguiling rambling shaggy dog-story quality."

In a generally positive review, J. Hoberman of The Village Voice refers to the film as "bravura moviemaking by any objective standard" and a "vehicle for the director's lowdown magic-realist fantasies about Romany gangsters, which has a velocity that belies its jerry-built mise-en-scène" concluding that "Black Cat, White Cat is determined to twist every character into an ideogram for vulgar humanity" while wondering if "these gypsies are a screen on which the Bosnian-born director can project his own feelings of ostracism and homelessness".

Salon's Andrew O'Hehir wrote a positive review, describing the film as "manic, carnivalesque, and treating death as a minor (and temporary) inconvenience" and commends "Kusturica's convincing portrayal of his homeland as a social and architectural ruin, where everything is either falling apart or overbuilt in misbegotten grandiosity". O'Hehir concludes with "Kusturica strikes a half-ironic tone throughout this overcrowded, cacophonous masterpiece that's almost impossible to categorize. In the tradition of Eastern European film, he's satirizing the conventions of rural magic realism at least as much as he's embracing them. But there's nothing cynical or cold-hearted about Black Cat, White Cat. Like the waves of geese, pigs, goats, dogs and cats that sometimes threaten to overwhelm the human characters, it is recklessly, indescribably alive". Peter Stack of the San Francisco Chronicle praised the film's characters who "whether freakish or treacherous, come up wonderfully human."

Web critic James Berardinelli praised the film as "something fresh and vibrant in an era when something as idiotic as Armageddon is the top-grossing movie of 1998 and films generally follow safe, comfortable patterns because that's what the studios' research shows that audiences want". He commended the film's "earthy feel as well as its charm that lies in it lacking the polished glaze of most big budget features although being expertly filmed", praised the performances of Bajram Severdžan and Branka Katić, and concluded that "while not a masterpiece, Kusturica's latest film is a real treat for those in search of a healthy dose of laughter set in a culture whose intricacies are rarely captured on film."

== Soundtrack ==
Original Soundtrack From The Film 'Black Cat White Cat'

Soundtrack album by Various artists
- Released: 1998 (CD)
- Genre: Soundtrack
- Length: 55:50
- Label: Barclay

Professional ratings
Review scores
Source	Rating
Allmusic	link

Music has an important place in this picture, as it is present in almost every scene. Zarije is especially devoted to music as he's seen with the local band playing specially for him on the way from hospital and then at the fair near the lake.

Track listing

No.	Title	Composer	Length
1.	"Bubamara / Bubamara (Main version)"	Dr. Nele Karajlić	3:57
2.	"Duj Sandale"	traditional	2:49
3.	"Železnička Stanica / Railway Station"	Dr. Nele Karajlić, Dejan Sparavalo, Vojislav Aralica	2:33
4.	"Jek di Tharin (Bluz Verzija) / Jek Di Tharin II (New version)"	traditional	3:55
5.	"Daddy, Don't Ever Die on a Friday"	Dr. Nele Karajlić, Dejan Sparavalo	3:18
6.	"Bubamara (Vivaldi version)"	Dr. Nele Karajlić	2:36
7.	"Odlazi nam deda / Daddy's gone"	traditional	1:07
8.	"Long Vehicle"	Dr. Nele Karajlić, Dejan Sparavalo	6:01
9.	"Pit bull (mixed by Pink Evolution)"	Dejan Sparavalo, Vojislav Aralica	3:40
10.	"El Bubamara pasa"	Dr. Nele Karajlić	3:20
11.	"Ja Volim Te Još/Meine Stadt"	Dr. Nele Karajlić, Dejan Sparavalo	3:14
12.	"Bubamara (Panj) / Bubamara (Tree Stump)"	Dr. Nele Karajlić	0:33
13.	"Jek Di Tarin"	traditional	2:42
14.	"Laži / Lies"	Vojislav Aralica	0:30
15.	"Potera / Hunting"	Dejan Sparavalo	1:01
16.	"Dejino kolo / Dejo dance"	Dejan Sparavalo	1:01
17.	"Bugarsko kolo / Bulgarian dance"	Dejan Sparavalo	1:25
18.	"Bubamara (Suncokret) / Bubamara (Sunflower)"	Dr. Nele Karajlić	3:10
19.	"Black Cat White Cat"	Vojislav Aralica	8:52

Other songs from the film, not included in the original soundtrack album:

1. "Where Do You Go" - Performed by No Mercy Club Mix version (Scene at Dadan's house)
2. "Nowhere Fast" - Performed by Fire Inc. (Ida is seen dancing to music video of this song)
3. "Money, Money, Money" (ABBA) - Covered by Dadan
4. "Ne dolazi" - Covered by Matko
5. "Dunaveki vali" - Performed by music box
6. "Lubenica" - Covered by Dadan
7. "Jek Ditharin" - Performed by Braca Lavaci
8. "Von cerena todikano svato" - Performed by Ljubica Adžović
9. "An der schönen blauen Donau" - Performed by the Belgrade Philharmonic Orchestra

Personnel

- Vojislav Aralica – guitar, keyboards
- Šaban Bajramović – vocals
- Rade Kosmajac – keyboards
- Zoran Milošević – accordion
- Bokan Stanković – trumpet

A few bootlegs of the soundtrack wrongly list Goran Bregovic as composer.
