= Ciby 2000 =

French film production and distribution company

Ciby 2000 (also written as CiBy 2000 and CIBY 2000) was a French film production and distribution company founded in 1990 by Francis Bouygues. It was best known for producing art house and independent films in France and in other countries.

The fifty films produced or co-produced by Ciby 2000 include Pedro Almodóvar's The Flower of My Secret and Live Flesh; Jane Campion's The Piano; David Lynch's Twin Peaks: Fire Walk with Me, The Straight Story and Lost Highway; Wim Wenders' The End of Violence; Robert Altman's Kansas City; Mike Leigh's Secrets & Lies; and Emir Kusturica's Black Cat, White Cat and Underground.

In its nine years of existence, Ciby 2000 produced or co-produced four Palme d'Or winners: The Piano, Underground, Taste of Cherry and Secrets & Lies. The company officially folded in 1998 amidst financial difficulties. The company was relaunched in 2004 with the release of Immortal.

The name Ciby 2000 is a play on the name of American director C. B. DeMille whose last name sounds similar to the French deux mille, "two thousand". The company stopped in 1998 due to financial difficulties, and Martin Bouygues' reluctance to support it. Paramount Pictures made an offer to buy the company for 500 million francs, but Monique Bouygues, Francis' widow, refused; the catalog was thus dispersed between TF1, MK2 and several companies.

== Films ==
- High Heels (1991)
- Twin Peaks: Fire Walk with Me (1992)
- Luna Park (1992)
- Little Buddha (1993)
- The Hour of the Pig (1993)
- The Piano (1993)
- Uncovered (1994)
- Muriel's Wedding (1994)
- The Glass Shield (1994)
- The Flower of My Secret (1995)
- Underground (1995)
- Secrets & Lies (1996)
- Kansas City (1996)
- Live Flesh (1997)
- The End of Violence (1997)
- Lost Highway (1997)
- Messieurs les enfants (1997)
- Black Cat, White Cat (1998)
- Que la lumière soit (1998)
- The Straight Story (1999)
- Immortal (2004) (Australian Distributor)
