= Predrag Laković =

Serbian actor

- Предраг Лаковић
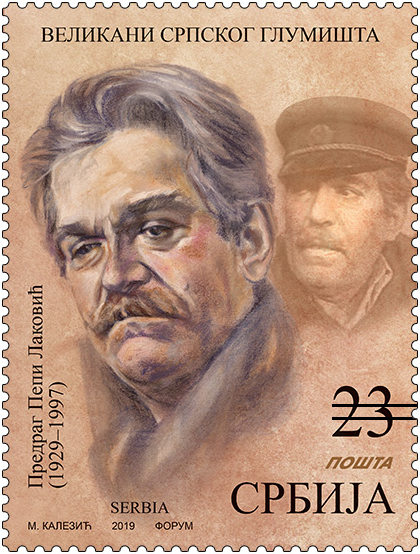
- Laković on a 2019 Serbia postage stamp.
- Born: 28 March 1929; Skopje, Vardar Banovina, Kingdom of Yugoslavia
- Died: 9 September 1997 (aged 68); Čurug, Serbia, FR Yugoslavia
- Occupation: Actor
- Years active: 1953–1997

Predrag Laković (Serbian Cyrillic: Предраг Лаковић; 28 March 1929 – 9 September 1997) was a Serbian actor. He appeared in more than one hundred films from 1953 to 1997.

== Selected filmography ==
Year	Title	Role	Notes
1998	Black Cat, White Cat	Priest	
1992	The Black Bomber	Gazda	
1989	Battle of Kosovo	Teofan	
1988	Time of the Gypsies		
1987	The Harms Case		
1985	When Father Was Away on Business	Franjo	
1984	Balkan Spy	Professor	
1975	Backbone	Pepi	
1958	The Sky Through the Trees		
1955	Hanka		
