= Dana Todorović =

Serbian writer (born 1977)

Dana Todorović, or sometimes Danica Todorović (born 2 October 1977) is a Serbian writer, translator and actress. Born to an American mother, Carolyn Kilkka, and Serbian father, Bora Todorović, she was educated in the US and UK. However, she now lives in Belgrade and writes primarily in Serbian.

Her debut novel Tragična sudbina Morica Tota (The Tragic Fate of Moritz Tot) was critically acclaimed and was nominated for the Branko Ćopić Prize. It has been published in English by Istros Books. Her second novel Park Logovskoj was similarly praised and nominated for major literary awards. She has also published short stories and children's books.

As a translator, she has translated plays and screenplays; she also worked for several years as an interpreter for the United Nations. Hailing from an acting family, she has acted on stage and on screen.

== See also ==
- Dana Todorović at IMDb
