= Time of the Gypsies =

Yugoslav film by Emir Kusturica

Дом за вешање Dom za vešanje Time of the Gypsies
- Original Yugoslav poster
- Directed by: Emir Kusturica
- Written by: Emir Kusturica; Gordan Mihić
- Produced by: Mirza Pašić; Harry Saltzman
- Starring: Davor Dujmović; Bora Todorović; Ljubica Adžović
- Cinematography: Vilko Filač
- Edited by: Andrija Zafranović
- Music by: Goran Bregović
- Production company: Forum Sarajevo
- Distributed by: Columbia Pictures
- Release dates: 21 December 1988 (Yugoslavia); 9 February 1990 (United States)
- Running time: 140 minutes
- Countries: Yugoslavia; Italy
- Languages: Romani; Serbo-Croatian; Italian

Time of the Gypsies (Serbo-Croatian: Дом за вешање, Dom za vešanje, lit. 'Home for Hanging') is a 1988 Yugoslav coming-of-age fantasy crime drama directed by Emir Kusturica. Filmed in Romani and Serbo-Croatian, Time of the Gypsies tells the story of a young Romani man with magical powers who is tricked into engaging in petty crime. It is widely considered to be one of Kusturica's best films. The film's shooting took place in Sarajevo, Skopje and Milan. It was selected as the Yugoslav entry for the Best Foreign Language Film at the 62nd Academy Awards, but was not accepted as a nominee. Time of the Gypsies is often noted for its extensive use of Romani (specifically the Balkan Romani dialect), which contributed to the film’s distinct cultural and linguistic authenticity. The film is multilingual, featuring dialogue in Romani, Serbo-Croatian, and, in parts, Italian.

The film revolves around Perhan, a Romani teenager with telekinetic powers and his passage from childhood to adulthood which starts in a little village in Yugoslavia and ends in the criminal underworld of Milan. The film deals with magical realism.

The film's soundtrack was composed by Goran Bregović.

== Plot ==
Perhan lives with his devoted grandmother Khatidža, his lame sister Danira and his dissolute uncle Merdžan. Khatidža possesses a level of supernatural powers (mainly healing) and Perhan himself has inherited some minor telekinetic abilities. He wants to marry a girl named Azra, but her mother will not allow it, as Perhan is the illegitimate son of a Slovenian soldier who had an affair with Perhan's late mother, and without a job or savings.

Ahmed, the "Gypsy sheikh", comes to the village with his brothers. Merdžan loses his clothes playing cards with Ahmed's brothers, and comes home desperate for money so that he can repay. It is raining and not finding any money, he accuses the grandmother of hiding the money from him and lifts the frame of the house up (using a rope and a truck), so that it is suspended in mid-air as the rain comes down on Perhan, his grandmother and Danira. Very soon after, Khatidža is summoned to use her powers to save Ahmed's sick son, Roberto, which Khatidža does. For repayment, she proposes a deal with Ahmed - to pay for Danira's leg to be healed at a hospital in Ljubljana. Perhan goes with Danira, promising his grandmother not to leave her, but Ahmed asks where will he stay and convinces him to go to Milan.

At first Perhan wants to make money honestly, but after being beaten, tortured and dragged through the mud, Perhan begins stealing and squirreling money away in a shack. After being double-crossed by his brother Sadam, Ahmed appoints Perhan boss of the operation. Now relatively rich, Perhan goes home, where he is enraged to find Azra is pregnant. Perhan refuses to believe that the baby is his. They marry with the condition that she would sell the baby. Perhan is also disappointed to find that the house Ahmed promised to build him is not being built at all, and that Danira was not operated on, but forced to be a beggar as part of Ahmed's money operation.

On their wedding night, Azra tells him the child is theirs, and was conceived when they had sex on the Feast of St George. Still wearing her wedding dress, Azra dies after giving birth to a boy while levitating mid-air (a sign that the boy, as he inherited the powers, is indeed Perhan's). Because Ahmed leaves with the baby, which we discover later is also named Perhan, he is raised by Ahmed's crew.

After four years of searching, Perhan reunites with Danira in Rome, who leads him to Perhan Jr., whom Perhan now accepts as his child. Perhan drops the children off at the train station, promising to meet up with them after buying an accordion for his son and a present (sponges) for grandmother. The boy tells him he is mad at him because he will not return, and he will not get an accordion. Perhan assures him he will, "Cross my gypsy heart," but immediately runs out of the station to settle the score with Ahmed, who is about to be married. Perhan arrives at the wedding and kills Ahmed with a fork, using his telekinetic powers. He also kills one of Ahmed's brothers, but he is in turn killed by Ahmed's new wife.

At the funeral, the grandmother passes out drinks to everyone and Perhan Jr. goes outside the house, peers through the window at his dead father, breaks the glass and steals the golden coins put on his father's eyes. Merdžan notices, and follows him out in the rain, as the child runs away hidden under a cardboard box. Merdžan is about to catch him up and pick up the board, but seems to have second thoughts, stops, and starts running toward the nearby church.

== Cast ==
English language poster

- Davor Dujmović - Perhan
- Bora Todorović - Ahmed
- Ljubica Adžović - Khatidža
- Husnija Hasimovic - Uncle Merdzan
- Sinolicka Trpkova - Azra
- Zabit Memedov - Zabit
- Elvira Sali - Danira
- Suada Karisik - Dzamila
- Predrag Lakovic - Ahmed's older brother
- Mirsad Zulic - Zef
- Ajnur Redzepi - Perhan's son
- Sedrije Halim - Azra's mother Ruza
- Saban Rojan - Azra's father Alija
- Branko Đurić - Sadam
- Marjeta Gregorac - Nurse in Ljubljana
- Boris Juh - Doctor in Ljubljana
- Ibro Zulic - Ramo
- Advija Redzepi -
- Emir Cerin - Ciro
- Irfan Jagli - Irfan

== Reception ==
On the review aggregator website Rotten Tomatoes, 100% of 7 critics' reviews are positive.

=== Awards ===
At the 1989 Cannes Film Festival, Emir Kusturica won the Best Director Award and the film was also nominated for a Palme d'Or (Golden Palm). At the 26th Guldbagge Awards in Sweden, it won the award for Best Foreign Film. In addition, Time of the Gypsies was nominated for Best Foreign Film at the 1990 César Awards in France.

== Trivia ==
Among the Roma actors that were part of the cast, was also Jadranka, daughter of Ljubica Adžović.

In an interview to the newspaper l'Unità, Emir Kusturica revealed: '[...] the actor who plays the older brother [Davor Dujmović], fell in love with the daughter [Jadranka] of the actress who plays the grandmother [Ljubica Adžović]. They ran off, leaving me in the middle of filming. The police searched for them in vain. Only the grandmother –a living monument, an incredible actress– knew where they had gone and allowed us to find them.'

== See also ==
- List of Yugoslav films
- Films about immigration to Italy
- List of submissions to the 62nd Academy Awards for Best Foreign Language Film
- List of Yugoslav submissions for the Academy Award for Best Foreign Language Film
- Romani people in Serbia
- Romani people in Italy
