= Vilko Filač =

Slovenian cinematographer (1950-2008)

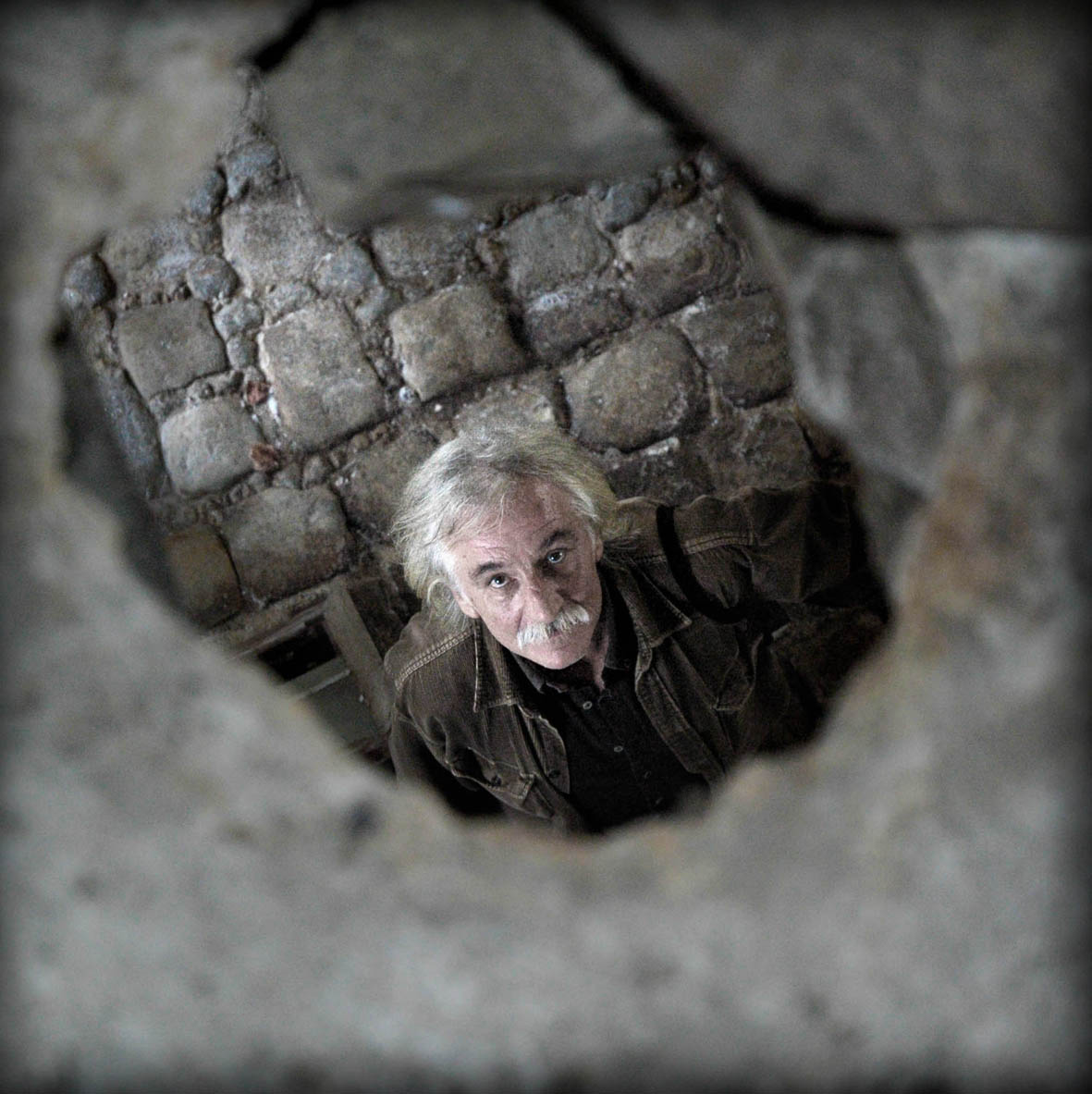
- Filač in 2007
- Born: 14 February 1950; Ptuj, PR Slovenia, FPR Yugoslavia
- Died: 25 November 2008 (aged 58); Ljubljana, Slovenia
- Occupation: Cinematographer
- Years active: 1978–2008

Vilko Filač (14 February 1950 – 25 November 2008) was a Slovenian cinematographer. A graduate of the Film and TV School of the Academy of Performing Arts in Prague, he is best known for his work with Emir Kusturica, including When Father Was Away on Business, Underground and Time of the Gypsies.
