= Bora Todorović =

Serbian and Yugoslav actor

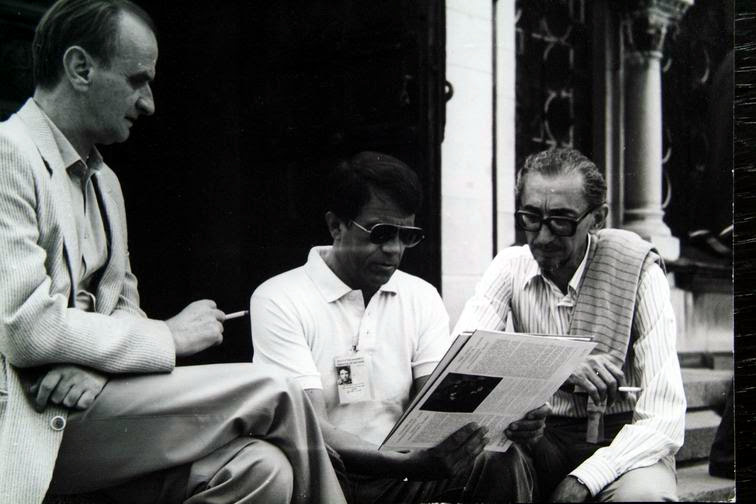
- Todorović (centre) in 1982
- Born: Borivoje Todorović; 5 November 1929; Belgrade, Kingdom of Yugoslavia
- Died: 7 July 2014 (aged 84); Belgrade, Serbia
- Education: Faculty of Dramatic Arts
- Occupation: Actor
- Years active: 1956–2008
- Spouses: Snežana Matić (m. 1961; div. 1973) Carolyn Kilkka (m. 1975)
- Children: Srđan; Dana; Tara

Borivoje "Bora" Todorović (Serbian Cyrillic: Боривоје "Бора" Тодоровић; 5 November 1929 – 7 July 2014) was a Serbian actor. He was the younger brother of the actress, Mira Stupica, and father of Srđan Todorović.

== Biography ==
He had an extensive acting career, and has had roles in critically acclaimed Yugoslavian films such as The Marathon Family (1982), Balkan Express (1983), Balkanski Špijun (Balkan Spy, 1984), Time of the Gypsies (1988), and Underground (1995).

His father died when he was a child. Following secondary school, Bora completed army service, at which point he had no plans to pursue an acting career. However, his older sister Mira's passion for acting exposed him to the business and soon he became passionate about it as well. He enrolled in the Belgrade Drama Arts Academy, and eventually acted on stage at the Beogradsko Dramsko Pozorište (Belgrade Drama Theatre). In 1957, Bora lived and acted in Zagreb, eventually returning to Belgrade in 1961. Between 1961 and 1983, Bora was a member of the "Atelje 212" theater in Belgrade, where he performed various roles. In October 2002, he appeared on the Zvezdara Teatar in Belgrade in the play Larry Thompson.

In his last years, Bora Todorović alternated between residences in Prague and Belgrade. He was married to American former gymnast and translator, Carolyn Kilkka–Todorović, with whom he had two children, a writer Dana (born 2 October 1977) and Tara (born 1993). His son Srđan Todorović (b. 1965), who also became an actor, is from his previous marriage to Snežana Matić.

== Awards ==
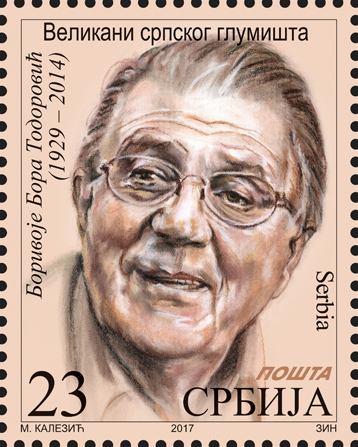
Todorović on a 2017 Serbian stamp

In November 2002, he received the Lifetime Achievement Award "Pavle Vujisić" for his roles in Yugoslav cinema, and in December 2006, he received the Lifetime Achievement Award "Dobričin prsten" for his roles in Yugoslav theater.

== See also ==
- List of Yugoslavian films
- List of Serbian films
