= When Father Was Away on Business =

1985 film by Emir Kusturica

- Serbian: Otac na službenom putu
- Serbian: Отац на службеном путу
- Directed by: Emir Kusturica
- Written by: Abdulah Sidran
- Produced by: Mirza Pašić
- Starring: Moreno De Bartoli; Miki Manojlović; Mirjana Karanović; Mustafa Nadarević; Mira Furlan; Davor Dujmović; Predrag Laković; Pavle Vujisić
- Cinematography: Vilko Filač
- Edited by: Andrija Zafranović
- Music by: Zoran Simjanović
- Production companies: Centar Film; Forum Sarajevo
- Distributed by: Scotia International Filmverleih (1985) (West Germany); Cannon Film Distributors (USA) (subtitled); Hollydan Works (2007-2008) (Non-US); Koch Lorber Films (2005) (USA)
- Release dates: 15 January 1985 (SFR Yugoslavia); 12 September 1985 (West Germany)
- Running time: 136 minutes
- Country: Yugoslavia
- Language: Serbo-Croatian
- Box office: $25,053 (West Germany only) $16,131 (USA only)

When Father Was Away on Business (Serbo-Croatian: Otac na službenom putu, Отац на службеном путу) is a 1985 Yugoslav film by director Emir Kusturica. The screenplay was written by the dramatist Abdulah Sidran. Its subtitle is A Historical Love Film and it was produced by Centar Film and Forum, production companies based in Sarajevo.

Set in post-World War II Yugoslavia during the Informbiro period, the film tells the story from the perspective of a boy, Malik, whose father Meša (Miki Manojlović) was sent to a labour camp. When Father Was Away on Business won the Palme d'Or at the 1985 Cannes Film Festival and was nominated for the Academy Award for Best Foreign Language Film.

== Plot ==
In June 1950, a local neighbourhood drunk, Čika Franjo, serenades field workers. He sings Mexican songs out of self-preservation, figuring it's safer for him to steer clear of songs originating from either of the two dominant global superpowers—the United States and the Soviet Union—in the prevailing climate of the Cold War. Yugoslavia is experiencing a paranoid and repressive internal apparatus looking to identify and remove enemies of the state in the wake of the Tito–Stalin Split. The local children, including Malik, climb trees and play around. Malik's mother, Sena, tells him that his father is on a business trip, while Malik is a chronic sleepwalker. His father, communist functionary Meša, was, in fact, sent to a labour camp by his own brother-in-law, Sena's brother Zijo, who is an even higher-positioned Communist functionary. Meša had made a remark about a political cartoon regarding the Tito–Stalin Split in the Politika newspaper.

Malik gets circumcised by his father's brother.

After a while, Meša's wife and children rejoin him in Zvornik. Malik meets and falls in love with Maša, the daughter of a Russian doctor, but last sees her when an ambulance takes her away.

At the wedding of his maternal uncle Fahro, Malik witnesses his father's affair with a woman pilot. She later tries to commit suicide by using a toilet's flush cord. Sena reconciles with her brother Zijah, who has been diagnosed with diabetes.

== Cast ==
- Moreno de Bartoli as Malik Malkoč
- Miki Manojlović as Mehmed "Meša" Malkoč
- Mirjana Karanović as Senija "Sena" Malkoč (née Zulfikarpašić)
- Mira Furlan as Ankica Vidmar
- Mustafa Nadarević as Zijah "Zijo" Zulfikarpašić
- Predrag Laković as Franjo
- Pavle Vujisić as Muzafer Zulfikarpašić
- Slobodan Aligrudić as Ostoja Cekić
- Aleksandar Dorčev as Dr. Evgeni Liakhov
- Silvija Puharić as Masha Liakhov
- Emir Hadžihafizbegović as Fahro Zulfikarpašić
- Davor Dujmović as Mirza Malkoč
- Eva Ras as Ilonka Petrović
- Jelena Čović as Nataša Petrović
- Amer Kapetanović as Serjoža Petrović
- Zoran Radmilović as Brko Pilot
- Tomislav Gelić as Hamdo Malkoč, barber and circumciser
- Zaim Muzaferija as the President

== Reception ==
The writer Danilo Kiš described the film as "an artistic and moral endeavour."

In The New York Times, Janet Maslin credited the film for "a humorous, richly detailed portrait" of its characters. Time critic Richard Corliss said the film was worth seeing despite the lack of glamorous settings or characters. Variety staff called it "rather witty commentary" and compared it to Czechoslovak comedy films in the 1960s. John Simon of the National Review described When Father Was Away on Business as "a film of undaunted honesty and unswerving intelligence, borne out aloft by humor, heartache, satire and compassion-an unbeatable combination".

In his 2015 Movie Guide, Leonard Maltin awarded it three and a half stars, praising it as "Captivating". In 2016, The Hollywood Reporter ranked it the 26th best film to win the Palme d'Or, citing it for depicting how "humor and the almost mystical power of family trumps all."

On the review aggregator website Rotten Tomatoes, 100% of 7 critics' reviews are positive, with an average rating of 7.2/10.

=== Accolades ===
When Father Was Away on Business marked Emir Kusturica's first time winning the Palme d'Or, the highest honour at the Cannes Film Festival. He won his second in 1995 for Underground.

Award	Date of ceremony	Category	Recipient(s)	Result	Ref(s)
Academy Awards	24 March 1986	Best Foreign Language Film	Emir Kusturica	Nominated	
Cannes Film Festival	8 – 20 May 1985	Palme d'Or	Emir Kusturica	Won	
Cannes Film Festival	8 – 20 May 1985	FIPRESCI Prize	Emir Kusturica	Won	
David di Donatello	1985	Best Foreign Director	Emir Kusturica	Nominated	
Golden Globes	24 January 1986	Best Foreign Film	Emir Kusturica	Nominated	
National Board of Review	27 January 1986	Top Foreign Films	Emir Kusturica	Won	
Pula Film Festival	20–27 July 1985	Big Golden Arena for Best Film	Emir Kusturica	Won	
Pula Film Festival	20–27 July 1985	Golden Arena for Best Actress	Mirjana Karanović	Won	

== See also ==
- List of Yugoslavian films
- List of submissions to the 58th Academy Awards for Best Foreign Language Film
- List of Yugoslav submissions for the Academy Award for Best Foreign Language Film
