= Davor Dujmović =

Yugoslavian actor

- Born: Davor Dujmović; 20 September 1969; Sarajevo, SR Bosnia and Herzegovina, SFR Yugoslavia
- Died: 31 May 1999 (aged 29); Novo Mesto, Slovenia
- Years active: 1984–1999

Davor Dujmović (20 September 1969 – 31 May 1999) was a Yugoslavian actor best known for his memorable roles in Emir Kusturica's movies as Mirza in When Father Was Away on Business, Perhan in Time of the Gypsies and Bata in Underground.

== Career ==
Born into a poor working-class family, Dujmović's acting career started purely by chance in 1984 when Miroslav Mandić, one of Emir Kusturica's assistant directors in charge of casting roles for When Father Was Away on Business, approached the youngster about being in the movie. The chance run-in took place at Dalmacija, a kafana near Sarajevo's Markale farmers' market, where Dujmović happened to be while visiting his father who had been operating a produce stand there. Upon seeing fourteen-year-old Davor in public, Kusturica's AD Mandić immediately thought the pubescent could potentially be perfect for the role of Mirza, the older son in the movie. After jointly convincing the teenager's father to let him audition, Kusturica and Mandić arranged a screen test that Dujmović aced and got the role.

Following the film's great critical acclaim and commercial success, Dujmović attempted to enroll at Sarajevo's Academy of Performing Arts (ASU) under the dean tenure of Boro Stjepanović. However, after getting rejected at the audition, the youngster got discouraged and never tried again. He continued getting film roles, though, such as the one in Zlatko Lavanić's (another one of Kusturica's ADs) directorial debut Strategija švrake. Kusturica also continued working with Dujmović, giving him a lead in Time of the Gypsies — a 1988 movie that would make twenty-year-old Davor well known across former Yugoslavia for his indelible portrayal of a young Gypsy named Perhan. He also started doing theatre, appearing in 1989 alongside Haris Burina, Maja Mijatović, and Jelena Čović in Mjesečeva predstava, a play put together by Mladen Materić at Otvorena scena Obala, a theater founded by Materić a few years earlier.

The role of Perhan made Dujmović a recognizable star and ensured film roles would continue coming his way — Adam ledolomak, Aleksa Šantić, Belle epoque - Posljednji valcer u Sarajevu, Sarajevske priče, Prokleta je Amerika. During this time he also became a cast member for the third season of the Yugoslav comedy TV sketch show Top lista nadrealista, which aired in late 1991.

Simultaneously, during the early 1990s, Davor started using hard drugs and quickly developed into a full-fledged heroin addict. During the first months of the war he stayed in Sarajevo, but later moved to Belgrade where he rejoined old friends, filming Underground with Kusturica as well as Složna braća TV series with Nele Karajlić. He unsuccessfully tried to kick his drug habit several times. At the end of the war, he moved to Banja Luka where he met up with Andrej J. Gartner with whom he started the Culture of Republika Srpska trust fund. He spent his last months with his girlfriend in Slovenia.

Davor Dujmović committed suicide by hanging on 31 May 1999, following severe depression. His last days were spent in the Slovenian town of Novo Mesto.

== Filmography ==
- When Father Was Away on Business (1985) as Brother Mirza
- Strategija švrake (1987)
- Time of the Gypsies (1988) as Perhan
- Istočno od istoka (1990)
- Adam ledolomak (1990)
- Belle epoque - Posljednji valcer u Sarajevu (1990) as Gavrilo Princip
- Top lista nadrealista (TV series, 1990–91) as various characters
- Praznik u Sarajevu (1991)
- Sarajevske priče (TV series, 1991) as Boban Kokot
- Prokleta je Amerika (1992)
- Aleksa Šantić (TV series, 1992)
- Složna braća (TV series, 1995) as Mustafa "Mute" Halimić
- Underground (1996) as Bata
