= Underground (1995 film) =

1995 film directed by Emir Kusturica

- Theatrical release poster
- Serbian: Подземље
- Directed by: Emir Kusturica
- Screenplay by: Dušan Kovačević; Emir Kusturica
- Story by: Dušan Kovačević
- Produced by: Maksa Ćatović; Pierre Spengler; Karl Baumgartner
- Starring: Miki Manojlović; Lazar Ristovski; Mirjana Joković; Slavko Štimac
- Cinematography: Vilko Filač
- Edited by: Branka Čeperac
- Music by: Goran Bregović
- Production companies: Ciby 2000; Pandora Film; Novofilm; A.B. Barrandov; Komuna; Radio Television of Serbia; Mediarex; ETIC; Tchapline Films; Film Fonds Hamburg; Eurimages
- Distributed by: Ciby 2000 (France); Komuna (FR Yugoslavia)
- Release date: 1 April 1995 (FR Yugoslavia)
- Running time: 170 minutes
- Countries: Yugoslavia (Serbia); Bulgaria; Czech Republic; France; Germany; Hungary
- Languages: Serbian; German
- Budget: €12.5 million
- Box office: $171,082 (North America)

Underground (Serbian: Подземље, romanized: Podzemlje), is a 1995 epic satirical absurdist dark comedy war film directed by Emir Kusturica, with a screenplay co-written with Dušan Kovačević. It is also known by the subtitle Once Upon a Time There Was One Country (Serbian: Била једном једна земља, romanized: Bila jednom jedna zemlja), the title of the five-hour miniseries (the long cut) shown on Serbian RTS television.

The film uses the epic story of two friends to portray a Yugoslav history from the beginning of World War II until the beginning of the Yugoslav Wars. It is an international co-production with companies from Yugoslavia (Serbia), France, Germany, Czech Republic and Hungary. The theatrical version is 163 minutes long. Kusturica stated in interviews that his original version ran for over five hours, and that co-producers forced edits.

Underground received widespread critical acclaim, and won the Palme d'Or at the 1995 Cannes Film Festival. It was Kusturica's second win following When Father Was Away on Business (1985). It went on to win other honours.

== Plot ==
On the morning of 6 April 1941 in Belgrade, the capital of the Kingdom of Yugoslavia, two bon vivants, Petar Popara, nicknamed Crni (Blacky) and Marko Dren, head home. They pass through Kalemegdan and shout salutes to Marko's brother Ivan, an animal keeper in the Belgrade Zoo. Marko lets Blacky's pregnant wife Vera know that they have enrolled Blacky in the Communist Party (KPJ).

=== Part One: War ===
The hungover Blacky eats breakfast while Vera complains about his supposed affair with a theatre actress. After the roar of the planes is heard, German bombs begin falling on Belgrade. After the air raid is over, Blacky goes out against Vera's wishes and inspects the devastated city. Encountering ruins and escaped animals from the zoo, he also runs into disconsolate Ivan carrying Soni, a baby chimp. The Royal Yugoslav Army's resistance is broken, and German troops occupy and dismember the Kingdom. Blacky starts operating clandestinely as a communist activist along with Marko and others. Blacky occasionally visits his mistress Natalija Zovkov who has been assigned to a special actors' labour brigade that is helping the city's rebuilding effort under German occupation. A celebrated actress in the National Theatre, Natalija has caught the eye of Franz, a high-ranking German officer.

Marko has set up a weapons stash in the cellar of his grandfather's house. Following their interception of a trainload of weapons, Marko and Blacky are identified as dangerous bandits in German radio bulletins. While Blacky hides in the woods as Germans intensify door-to-door raids, Marko takes Vera, Ivan and others into the cellar to hide. Vera gives birth to a baby boy, who she names Jovan before dying.

In 1944, Blacky is in town to celebrate Jovan's birthday at a communist hangout. The two best friends head for the theatre and see Natalija performing on stage in front of Franz and other German officers. Blacky shoots Franz in the chest (he survives) and, along with Natalija and Marko, reaches the river boat anchored outside Belgrade. There, they all get ready for a forced wedding despite Natalija's protestations.

The party is interrupted by German soldiers surrounding the boat. Franz yells, demanding Blacky and Marko release Natalija, who runs to him. Blacky is captured by Germans and tortured in a hospital with electric shocks while Franz and Natalija visit her brother Bata there. Meanwhile, Marko finds a way to enter the building through an underground sewer passage. Sneaking up on Franz, Marko strangles him to death with a cord in front of Natalija who switches sides once again. Marko then proceeds to free Blacky. They leave with a fatigued Blacky hidden in a suitcase, but he is injured by a grenade.

Days later on Easter 1944, Marko and Natalija, now a couple, watch a comatose Blacky. In late October, the Red Army accompanied by Yugoslav Partisans enters Belgrade. Marko gives speeches from the National Theater balcony during the Trieste crisis, socializes with Josip Broz Tito, Aleksandar Ranković and Edvard Kardelj, and stands next to Tito during military parades through downtown Belgrade.

=== Part Two: Cold War ===
In 1961, Marko is one of Tito's closest associates and advisors. The physically recovered Blacky and company are still in the cellar under the impression that the War is still going on above. Marko and Natalija attend a ceremony to open a cultural center and unveil a statue of Petar Popara Blacky, who everyone thinks died, becoming a People's Hero. With the help of his grandfather who is in on the con, Marko oversees the weapons manufacturing and even controls time by removing hours to a day so the people in the cellar think that only 15 years passed since the beginning of World War II instead of 20.

The filming of a state-sponsored motion picture based on Marko's memoirs titled Proleće stiže na belom konju (Spring Comes On A White Horse) begins above ground. Soon, Blacky's son Jovan will marry Jelena, a girl he grew up with in the cellar. Soni wanders into a tank and fires it, blowing a hole in the wall. Soni wanders off, and Ivan follows.

Blacky, with his son Jovan, emerges from underground for the first time in decades. They encounter the movie set and, believing the war is still on, kill two extras and the actor playing Franz. In the manhunt, Jovan drowns but Blacky escapes.

=== Part Three: War ===
In 1992, at the height of the Yugoslav Wars, Ivan re-emerges with Soni with whom he was recently reunited. He stumbles upon Marko who attempts to broker an arms deal in the middle of a conflict zone. The deal falls through and Ivan catches up with Marko and beats him to unconsciousness, then commits suicide. Natalija arrives and rushes to Marko's side. They are captured by militants and they are ordered to be executed as arms dealers by militants' commander, Blacky.

Blacky moves his people out to the cellar where he lived years ago, taking Soni with him. He sees an image of Jovan in a well, and falls in while reaching for him, presumably ending his life as well.

In a dreamlike sequence, Blacky, Marko, Vera and others re-emerge from underneath the water and are reunited at an outside dinner party on a small grass peninsula to celebrate Jovan's wedding. Ivan gives a few parting words, saying that they will impart to their children fairy tales that start with "Once upon a time, there was a country." As the group sings and dances, the ground separates from the peninsula, forming an island, and seemingly floats away into the distance with them still on it.

== Cast ==
- Miki Manojlović as Marko Dren, a career-climbing Communist Party activist who becomes its high-ranking official and organizer of the communist resistance weapons manufacturing during World War II as well as the lucrative arms trade after the war ends. In parallel, he becomes an influential and wealthy arms dealer as well as a post-war Communist Yugoslavia state dignitary.
- Lazar Ristovski as Petar "Blacky" Popara, an electrician who idealistically joins the Communist Party right before World War II and goes on to mark himself out as a skilled and determined Partisan guerilla resistance fighter during the war's early stages only to end up in a weapons manufacturing cellar for the remainder of it. Once he finally emerges from the cellar, many decades after World War II ended, he becomes a Yugoslavian patriot during the Yugoslav Wars.
- Mirjana Joković as Natalija Zovkov, an opportunistic theatre actress constantly switching loyalties
- Slavko Štimac as Ivan Dren, Marko's stutterer brother who cares for zoo animals
- Ernst Stötzner as Franz, a Wehrmacht officer in charge of occupied Belgrade during World War II. Stötzner also portrays the actor playing Franz in Proleće stiže na belom konju.
- Srđan Todorović as Jovan Popara, Blacky's son, who lives almost his entire life underground
- Mirjana Karanović as Vera, Blacky's wife
- Danilo Stojković as Grandfather, Marko's grandfather who owns the cellar and helps perpetuate his ruse
- Bora Todorović as Golub, the leader of the brass orchestra that frequently accompanies Blacky and Marko
- Davor Dujmović as Bata, Natalija's crippled brother
- Mirsad Tuka as Investigator
- Predrag Zagorac as Tomislav

== Production ==
The shooting of the film began in fall 1993 and lasted off-and-on until early spring 1995. The state-owned Radio Television of Serbia had a small role in financing the film, and the film used rented Yugoslav Army (VJ) equipment as props.

=== Soundtrack ===
The film's soundtrack includes music by Goran Bregović and the participation of Cesária Évora.

== Release ==
In France, where it opened on 25 October 1995, the film drew only about 350,000 spectators. It also struggled to find a U.S. distributor, and for a long time was limited to a handful of festival screenings in the territory, as Miramax denied rumors that they had picked it up. The rights were eventually acquired by boutique company New Yorker Films, who gave the picture its general audience premiere on June 20, 1997, in New York City. Some sources cite its performance as a reason for the closure of French producer CiBy 2000.

== Reception ==
=== Critical reception ===
Underground has not been widely reviewed by English-language critics, though it has gained generally favorable reviews. Rotten Tomatoes reports an 86% approval rating based on 37 reviews, with an average rating of 7.5/10. The website's critics consensus reads: "Offering an insightful look at Communist Eastern Europe through the microcosm of a long friendship, Underground is an exhausting, exhilarating epic." Metacritic assigned the film a weighted average score of 79 out of 100, based on 17 critics, indicating "generally favorable reviews".

In the New York Daily News, Dave Kehr lauded the film as "ferociously intelligent and operatically emotional," and Kevin Thomas of the Los Angeles Times called it a "sprawling, rowdy, vital film laced with both outrageous absurdist dark humor and unspeakable pain, suffering and injustice". Variety's Deborah Young reviewed the film after seeing it at the 1995 Cannes Film Festival, praising it as "a steamroller circus that leaves the viewer dazed and exhausted, but mightily impressed", and adding that "if Fellini had shot a war movie, it might resemble Underground".

Writing in Sight & Sound in November 1996, British author Misha Glenny delivered a stinging attack on critics who view Underground or Srđan Dragojević's Lepa sela lepo gore through a simplistic, reductionist pro- or anti-Serb critical lens.

Janet Maslin of the New York Times wrote that the film's "real heart is its devastating idea of a morning after: the moment when, after being in the grip of a political delusion lasting several decades, a man can emerge from a subterranean hiding place in his native Yugoslavia and be told that there is no Yugoslavia any more". While acknowledging that "the politics of Underground have been assailed and dissected by international audiences", she feels that "this debate is largely specious as there's no hidden agenda to this robust and not terribly subtle tale of duplicity with Mr. Kusturica's central idea being a daringly blunt representation of political chicanery that fools an entire society, and of the corruption that lets one man thrive at the expense of his dearest friend". In her article "Europe (Un)Divided: How Peace Was Won and the War Never Lost in Wim Wender's Lisbon Story (1995) and Emir Kusturica's Bila Jednom Jedna Zemlja/Underground (1995)" for the Journal for Contemporary European Studies, Evelyn Preuss points out how the film critiques dominant Western ideologies by showing East and West as well as past and present in a continuity rather than divided or marked by caesuras. This critique explains the fervent political response to the film.

=== Political response ===
Critics saw the characters Marko and Blacky as "Kusturica's idealization of Serbs trapped into desperate acts by history and others' evil while the cowardly characters in the film were Croats and Bosnians, who chose betrayal and collaboration."

Stanko Cerović, director of the Serbo-Croatian editorial department of Radio France Internationale, strongly denounced the film in June 1995, accusing Kusturica of spreading Serbian propaganda, using historical footage in cases except "the bombardment of Vukovar, or the three-year-long destruction of his native city by the Serbian army". However, in 2012 Cerović said that it was not propaganda and "It's quite possible that Underground will age well".

Throughout the 1990s, Kusturica was frequently attacked by French public intellectuals Bernard-Henri Lévy and Alain Finkielkraut in the French media over his life and career choices. Generally, the two viewed Kusturica as a "traitor who crossed over to the enemy side thus turning his back on his city, his ethnic roots, and his nation". Finkielkraut had not seen the film, but wrote in Libération "that offensive and stupid falsification of the traitor taking the palm of martyrdom had to be denounced immediately". Meanwhile, Lévy called Kusturica a "fascist author" while reserving his further judgment upon seeing the film. After watching Underground, Lévy called Kusturica a "racist genius in the mold of Louis-Ferdinand Céline". Other intellectuals such as André Glucksmann and Peter Handke joined the debate.

During the September 2008 discussion between the Slovenian philosopher Slavoj Žižek and Bernard-Henri Lévy on the issues surrounding the historical and social significance of May 1968 in France, Žižek brought up Underground and Kusturica to Lévy by saying: "Underground I think is one of the most horrible films that I've seen ... What kind of Yugoslav society you see in Kusturica's Underground? A society where people all the time fornicate, drink, fight - a kind of eternal orgy." Lévy answered that he considers himself an "enemy of Kusturica, the man", but that Underground is "not a bad movie" before going on to commend the film's narrative structure and conclude that "Kusturica is one of the cases, we have some writers like this, where the man is so, so, so more stupid than his work". Bosnian-American novelist Aleksandar Hemon criticized Underground in 2005, saying that it downplayed Serbian atrocities by "presenting the Balkan war as a product of collective, innate, savage madness."

=== Accolades ===
Underground won the Palme d'Or (Golden Palm) award at the 1995 Cannes Film Festival, considered the festival's highest honor. It was director Emir Kusturica's second such award after When Father Was Away on Business. Underground was selected as the Serbian entry for the Best Foreign Language Film at the 68th Academy Awards, but was not accepted as a nominee. Underground also nominated for Best Foreign Film at the 13th Independent Spirit Awards nearly 3 years after the film won Palme d'Or, but lost to The Sweet Hereafter.

| Award | Date of ceremony | Category | Recipient(s) | Result | Ref(s) |
|---|---|---|---|---|---|
| Boston Society of Film Critics | 14 December 1997 | Best Foreign Language Film | Emir Kusturica | Won | |
| Cannes Film Festival | 17 – 28 May 1995 | Palme d'Or | Emir Kusturica | Won | |
| César Awards | 3 February 1996 | Best Foreign Film | Emir Kusturica | Nominated | |
| Independent Spirit Awards | 21 March 1998 | Best Foreign Film | Emir Kusturica | Nominated | |
| Lumière Awards | 29 January 1996 | Best Foreign Film | Emir Kusturica | Won | |
| National Society of Film Critics | 3 January 1998 | Best Foreign Language Film | Emir Kusturica | 2nd Place | |
| New York Film Critics Circle | 11 December 1997 | Best Foreign Language Film | Emir Kusturica | Runner-up | |

== Libel lawsuit ==
On 8 March 2001, Serbian newsmagazine Vreme published an op-ed piece by Serbian playwright Biljana Srbljanović under the headline "Hvala lepo" in which she refers to Underground in passing as "being financed by Milošević" and accuses Kusturica of being "an immoral profiteer". She goes on to accuse the director of "directly collaborating with the regime via his friend Milorad Vučelić". On 20 March 2001, Kusturica decided to sue Srbljanović for libel.

Before the first court date in September 2001, Vreme magazine organized a mediation attempt between the two parties, with Kusturica and Srbljanović meeting face to face in the magazine's offices. At the meeting Kusturica expressed willingness to drop the charges if Srbljanović issued a public apology, which Srbljanović refused. The next day at the first court date Srbljanović once again rejected the offer of a public apology. The court case thus continued with Kusturica's lawyer Branislav Tapušković presenting details of the film's financing sources, most of which were French production companies. On 11 December 2003, the municipal court ruled in Kusturica's favour, ordering Srbljanović to pay damages as well as to cover the court costs.

== See also ==
- List of Yugoslav films
- Who's That Singing Over There
- List of submissions to the 68th Academy Awards for Best Foreign Language Film
- List of Serbian submissions for the Academy Award for Best Foreign Language Film
