= Palme d'Or =

Highest prize awarded at the Cannes Film Festival

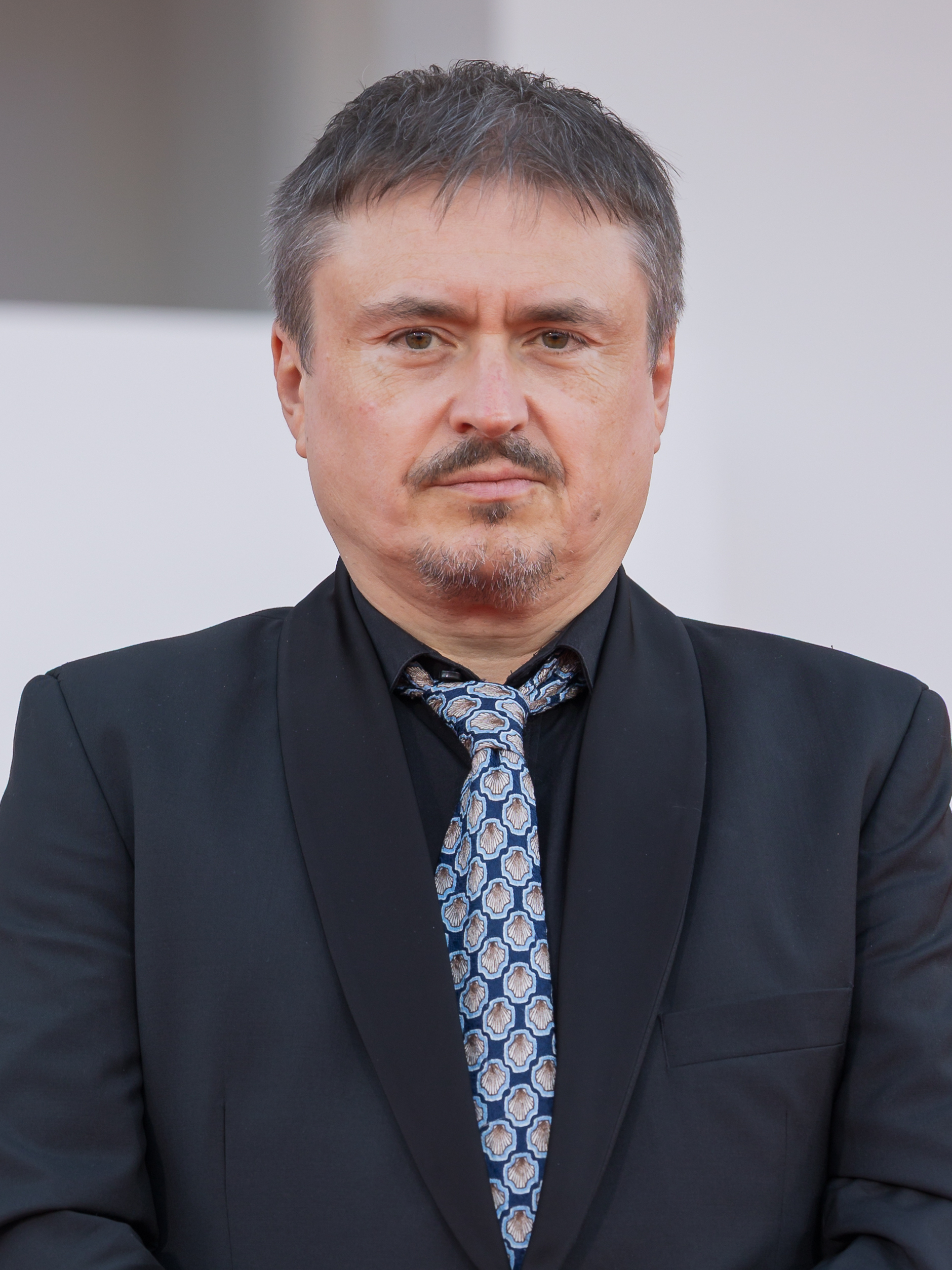
- 2026 recipient: Cristian Mungiu
- Location: Cannes
- Country: France
- Presented by: Cannes Film Festival
- Currently held by: Cristian Mungiu for Fjord (2026)
- Website: Official website

The Palme d'Or (French pronunciation: [palm(ə) dɔʁ]; English: Golden Palm) is the highest prize awarded to the director of the Best Feature Film of the Official Competition at the Cannes Film Festival. It was introduced in 1955 by the festival's organizing committee. Previously, from 1939 to 1954, the festival's highest prize was the Grand Prix du Festival International du Film. In 1964, the Palme d'Or was replaced again by the Grand Prix, before being reintroduced in 1975.

The Palme d'Or is widely considered one of the film industry's most prestigious awards.

== History ==
The Commune of Cannes coat of arms

In 1954, the festival decided to present an award annually, titled the Grand Prix of the International Film Festival, with a new design each year from a contemporary artist. The festival's board of directors invited several jewellers to submit designs for a palm, in tribute to the coat of arms of the city of Cannes, evoking the famous legend of Saint Honorat and the palm trees lining the famous Promenade de la Croisette. The original design by Parisian jeweller Lucienne Lazon, inspired by a sketch by director Jean Cocteau, had the bevelled lower extremity of the stem forming a heart, and the pedestal a sculpture in terracotta by the artist Sébastien.

In 1955, the first Palme d'Or was awarded to Delbert Mann for his film Marty. From 1964 to 1974, the festival temporarily resumed a Grand Prix. In 1975, the Palme d'Or was reintroduced and has since remained the festival's symbol, awarded each year to the director of the winning film, presented in a case of pure red Morocco leather lined with white suede.

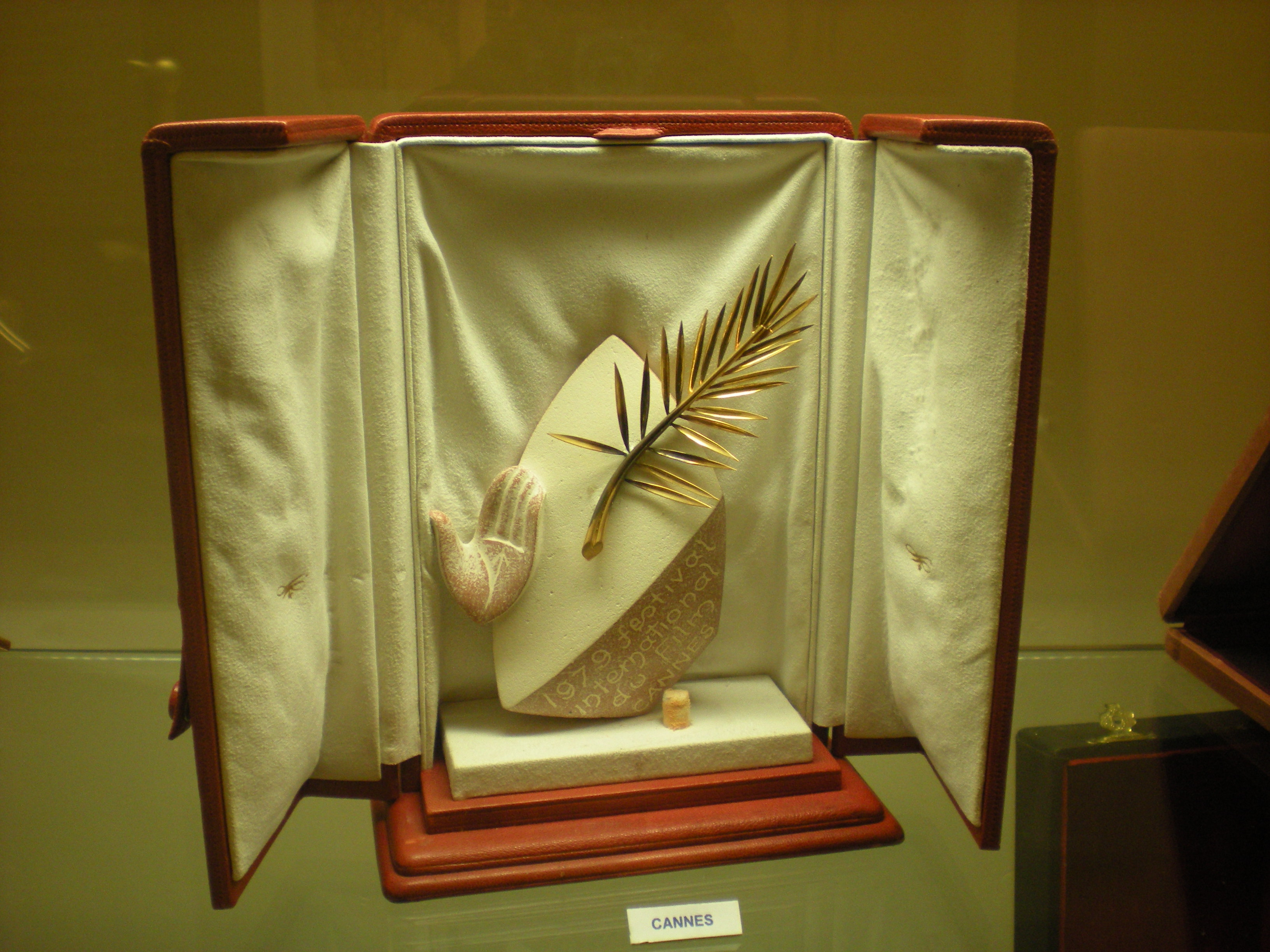
Palme d'Or awarded to Apocalypse Now at the 1979 Cannes Film Festival

Since its reintroduction, the prize has been redesigned several times. At the beginning of the 1980s, the rounded shape of the pedestal, bearing the palm has gradually transformed to become pyramidal in 1984. In 1992, Thierry de Bourqueney redesigned the Palme and its pedestal in hand-cut crystal. In 1997, Caroline Scheufele redesigned the statuette; since then, it has been manufactured by the Swiss jewellery firm Chopard. The palm is made from 4.16 oz (118 g) of 18-carat yellow gold while the branch's base forms a small heart. A single piece of cut crystal forms a cushion for the palm, which is hand-cast into a wax mould and now presented in a case of blue Morocco leather. In 1998, Theo Angelopoulos was the first director to win the Palme d'or as it appears today, for his film Eternity and a Day.

In 2013, when Blue Is the Warmest Color won the Palme d'Or, the jury headed by Steven Spielberg awarded it to the film's actresses Adèle Exarchopoulos and Léa Seydoux, as well as the director Abdellatif Kechiche. This remains the only instance where multiple Palme d'Or trophies were presented. The jury decided to include the actresses in the recognition due to a Cannes policy that forbids the Palme d'Or-winning film from receiving any additional awards. This policy would have prevented the jury from acknowledging the actresses separately. Regarding the unorthodox decision, Spielberg commented, "Had the casting been 3% wrong, [the film] wouldn't have worked like it did for us". Subsequently, Kechiche auctioned off his Palme d'Or trophy to fund his new feature film. In an interview with The Hollywood Reporter, he expressed dissatisfaction with the festival's decision to award multiple trophies, stating that he felt they had "publicly insulted" him. He added, "Liberating myself from this Palme d'Or is a way of washing my hands of this sorry affair".

The 2014 award ceremony which awarded the Palme d'Or to Winter Sleep, a Turkish film by Nuri Bilge Ceylan, occurred during the 100th anniversary year of Turkish cinema. On receiving the award, Ceylan dedicated it to the "young people" involved in Turkey's ongoing political unrest, and the workers killed in the Soma mine disaster, which occurred on the day before the commencement of the awards event. In 2017, the award was redesigned to celebrate the festival's 70th anniversary. The diamonds were provided by an ethical supplier certified by the Responsible Jewellery Council.

The 2020 Cannes Film Festival was cancelled due to the ongoing COVID-19 pandemic. 56 films were announced as official selections by the festival, but no awards were presented for the first time since 1968.

From 2026, the non-English language winners will also be automatically eligible for the Academy Award for Best International Feature Film.

As of 2026, Jane Campion, Julia Ducournau and Justine Triet are the only female directors to have won the prize (for The Piano, Titane, and Anatomy of a Fall, respectively). However, Bodil Ipsen won the Grand Prix du Festival International du Film for The Red Meadows (along with Lau Lauritzen Jr.) as part of an 11-way tie at the inaugural 1946 festival.

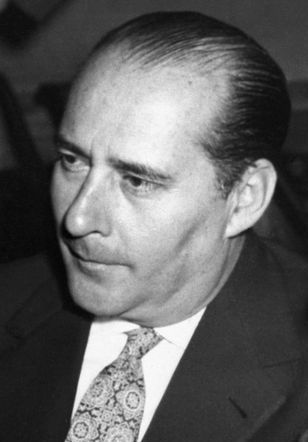
Roberto Rossellini won in 1946.

== Winners ==
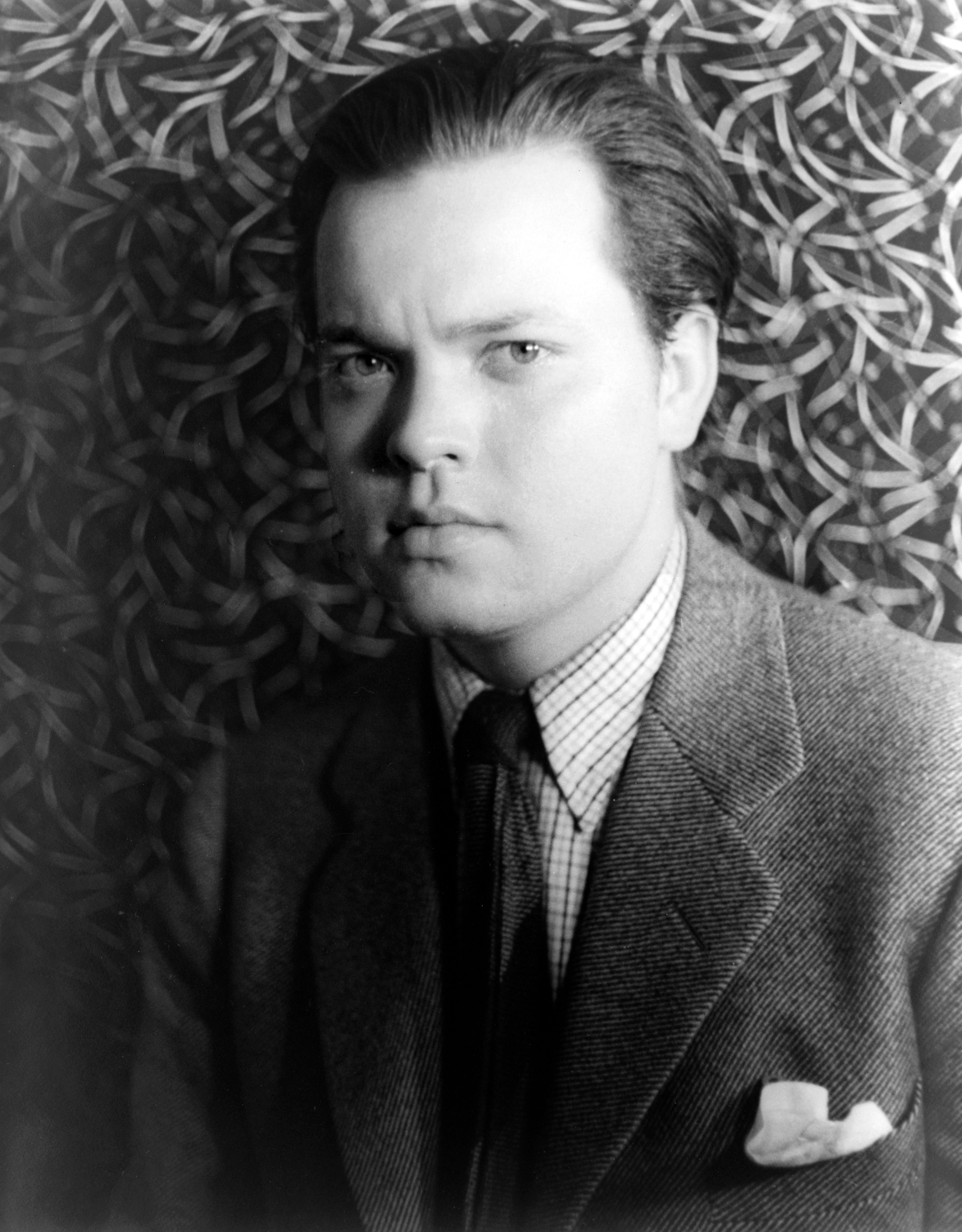
Orson Welles won in 1952.

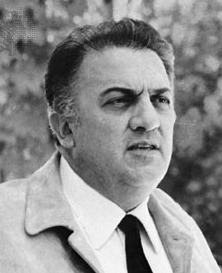
Federico Fellini won in 1960.

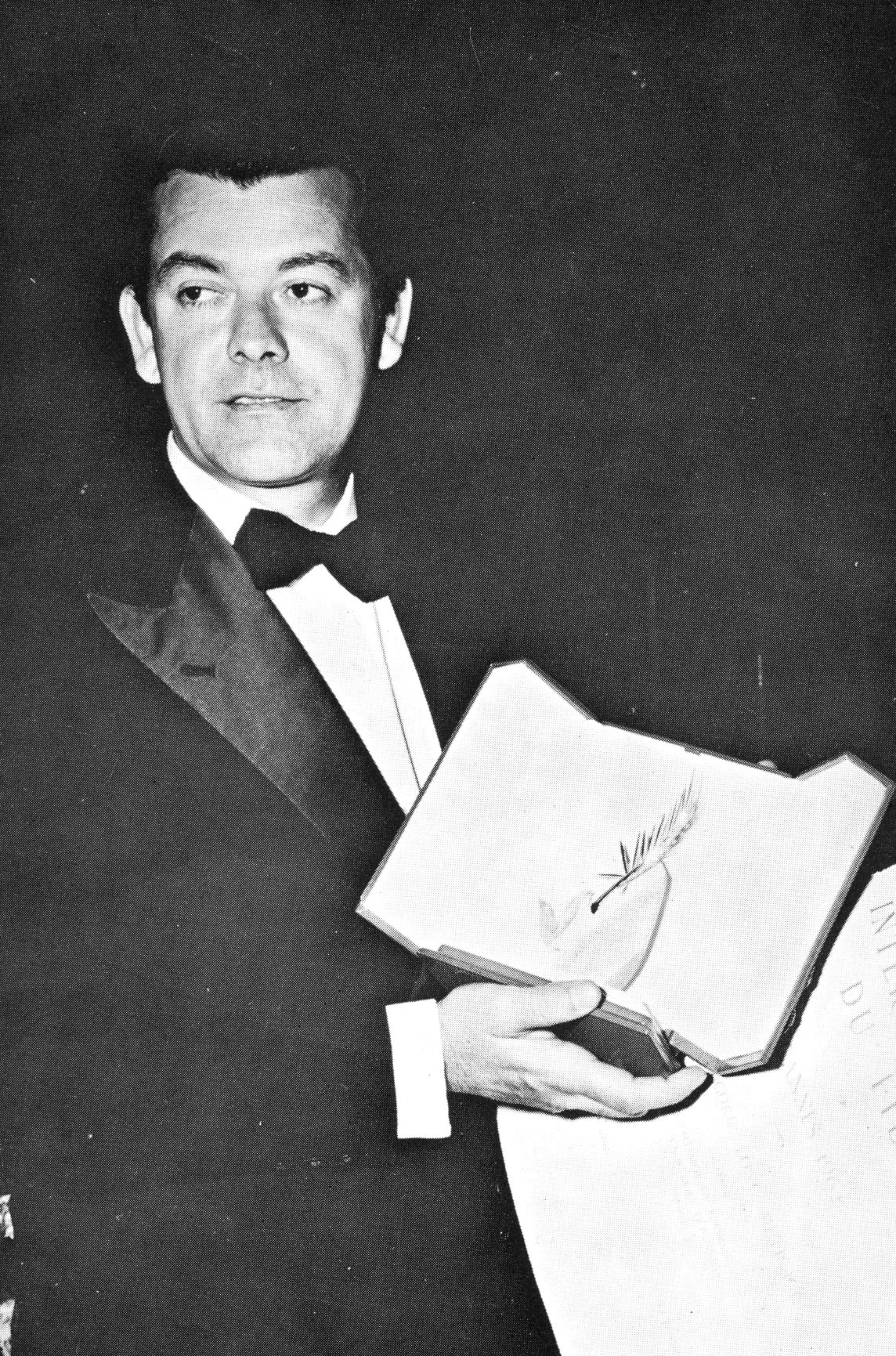
Anselmo Duarte won in 1962.

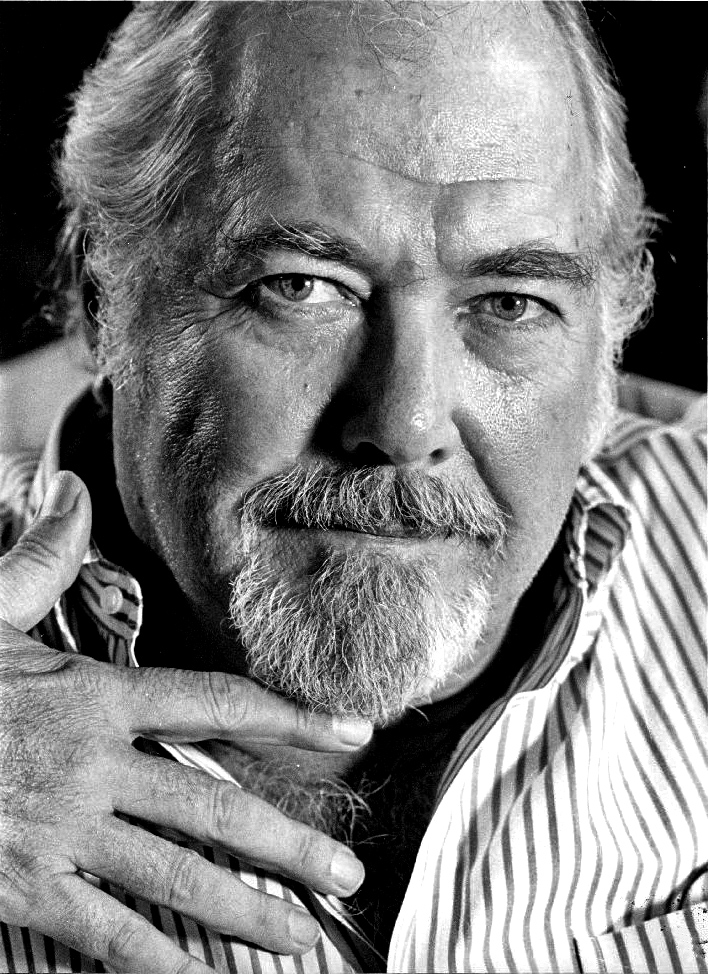
Robert Altman won in 1970.

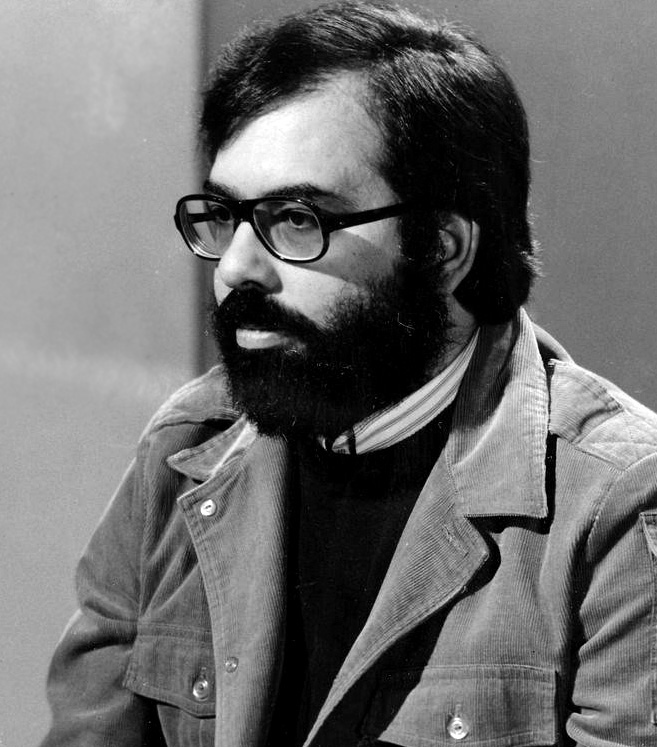
Francis Ford Coppola won twice, in 1974 and 1979.

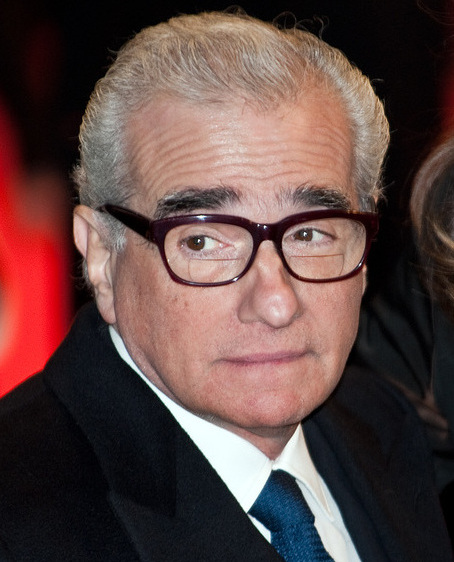
Martin Scorsese won in 1976.

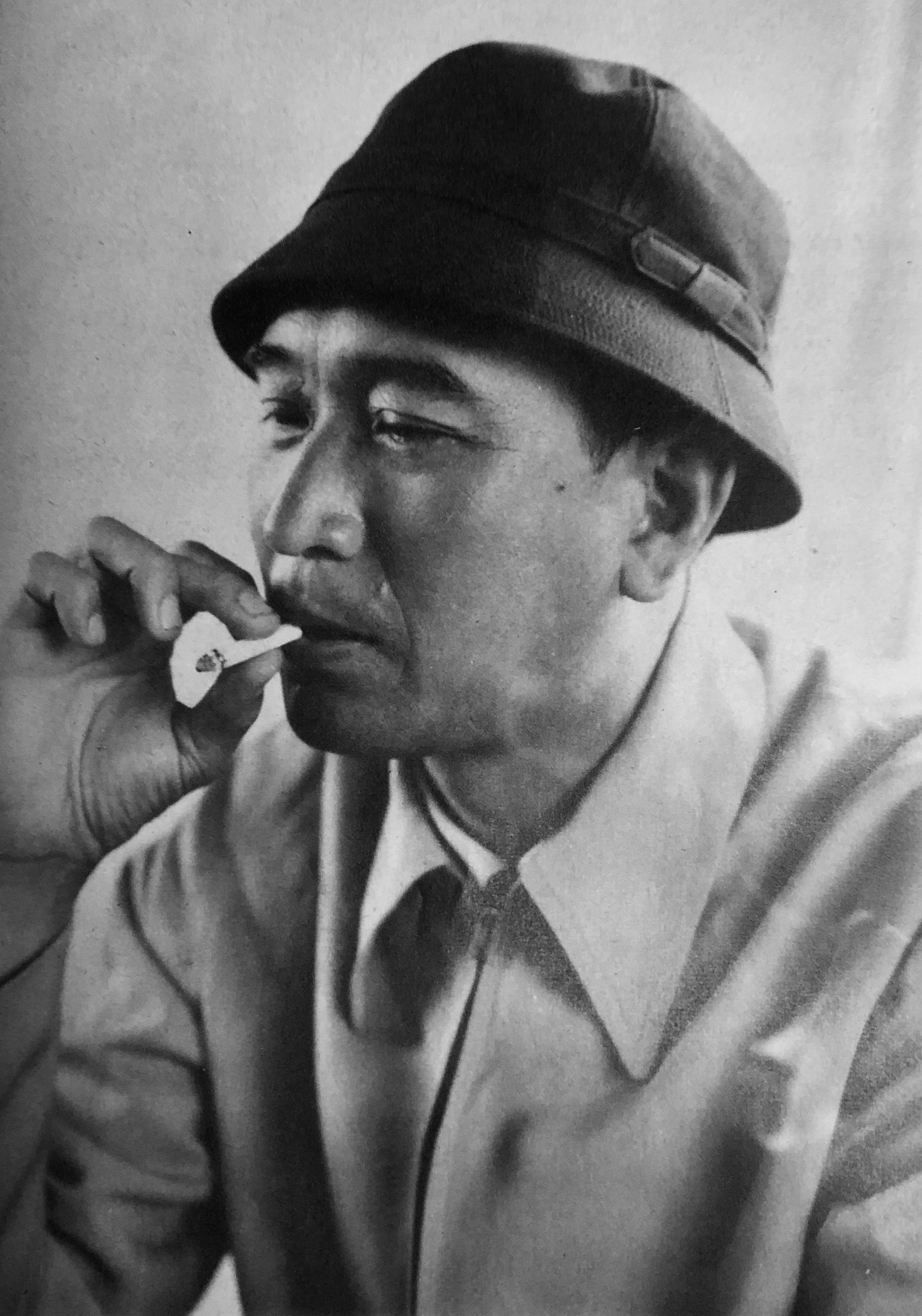
Akira Kurosawa won in 1980.

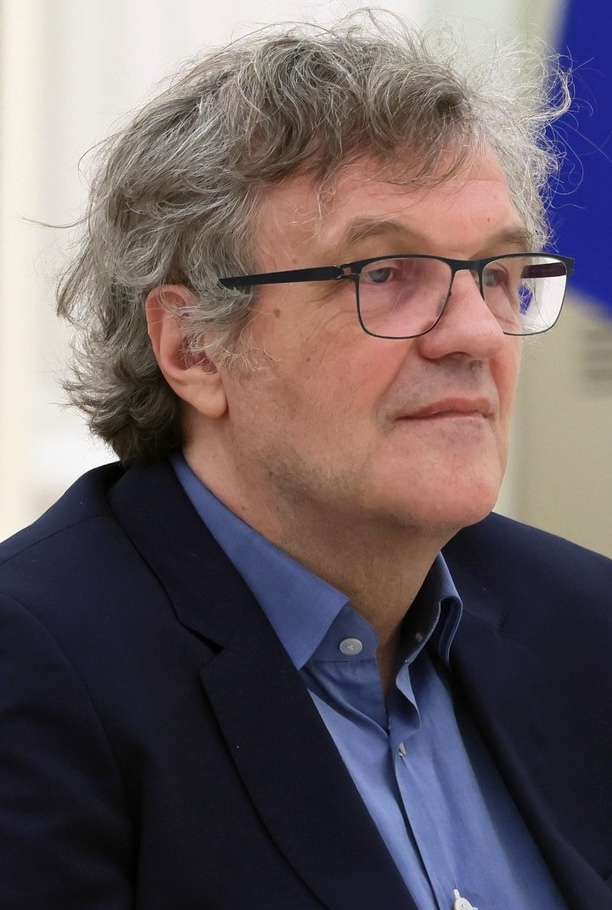
Emir Kusturica won twice, in 1985 and 1995.

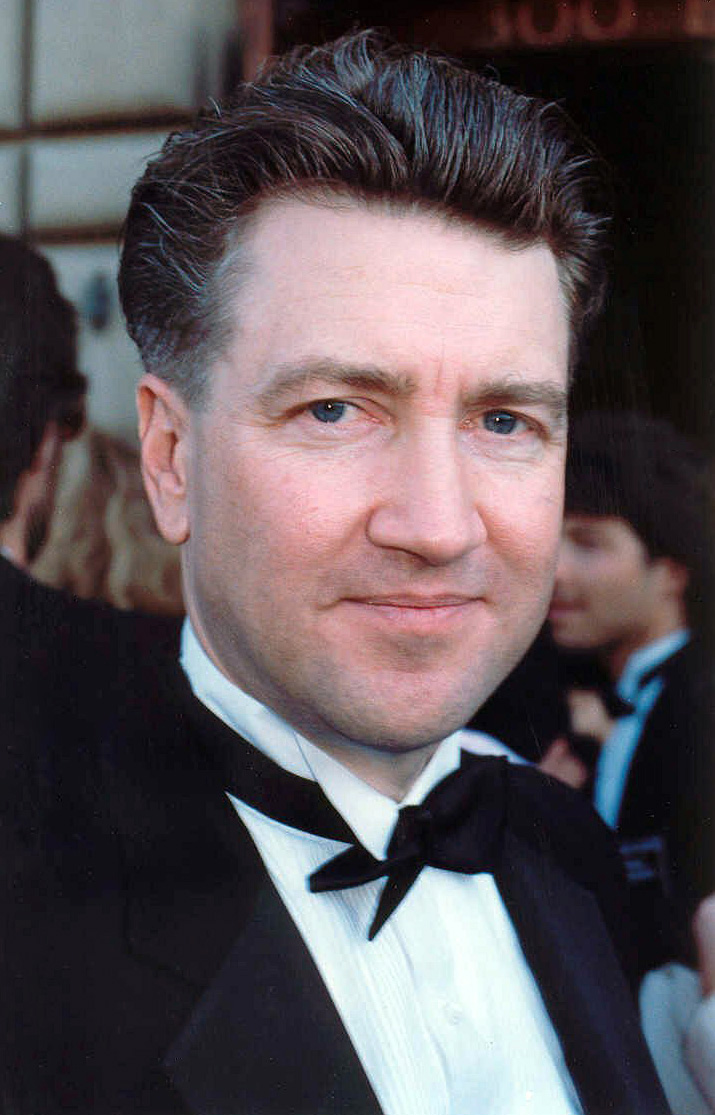
David Lynch won in 1990.

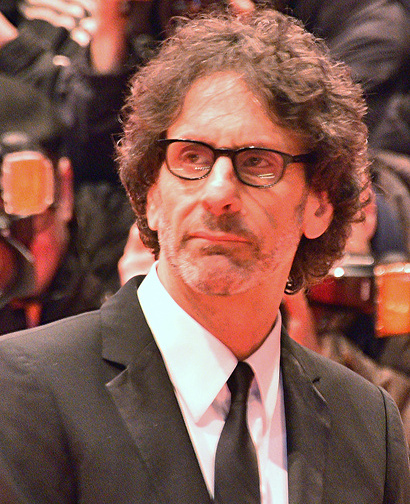
Joel Coen won in 1991.

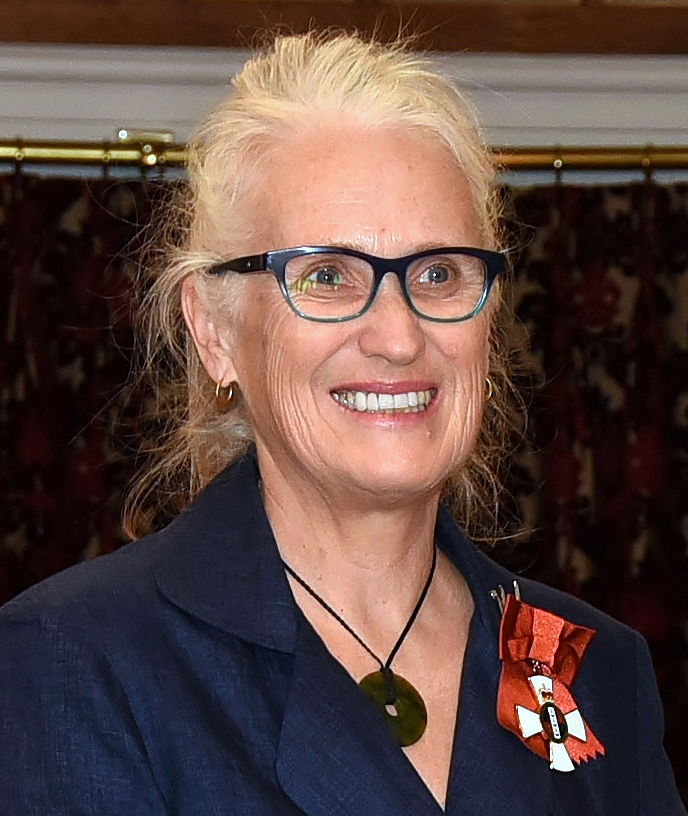
Jane Campion won in 1993, becoming the first woman to win it.

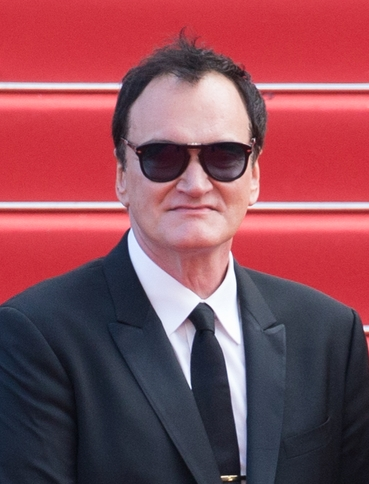
Quentin Tarantino won in 1994.

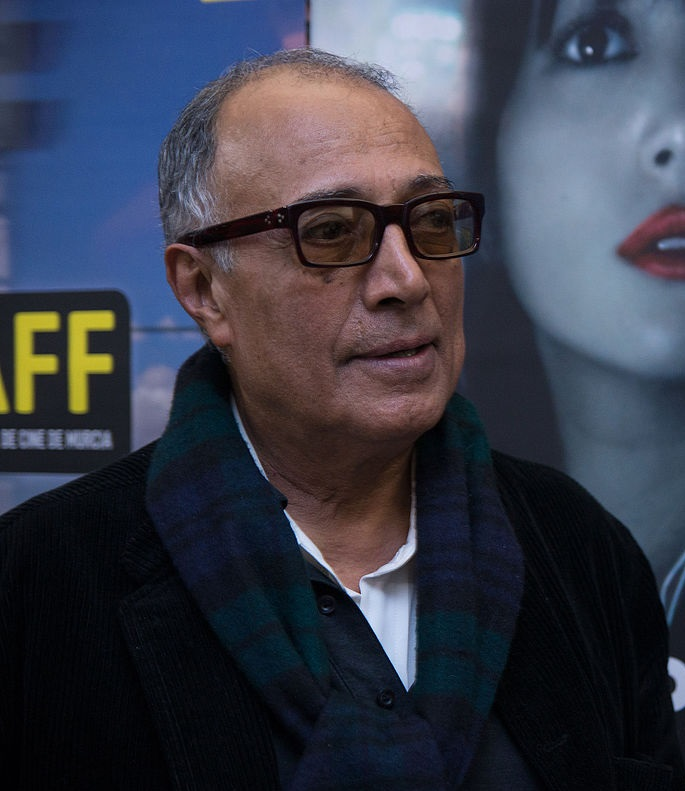
Abbas Kiarostami won in 1997.

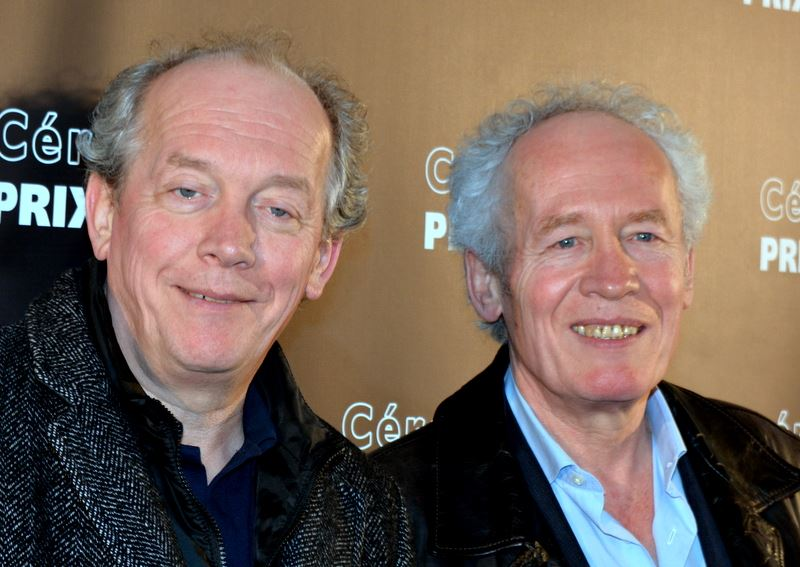
Jean-Pierre & Luc Dardenne won twice, in 1999 and 2005.

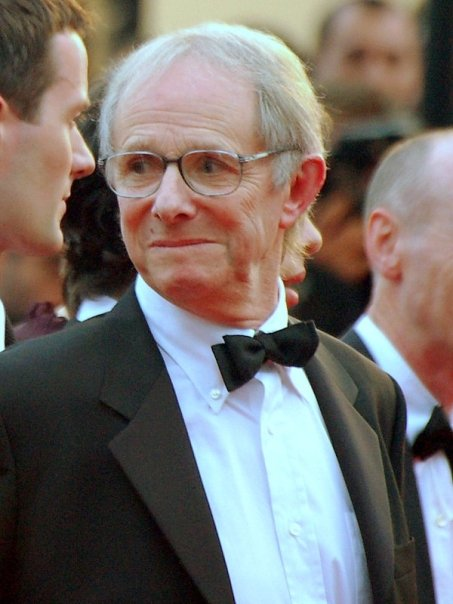
Ken Loach won twice, in 2006 and 2016.

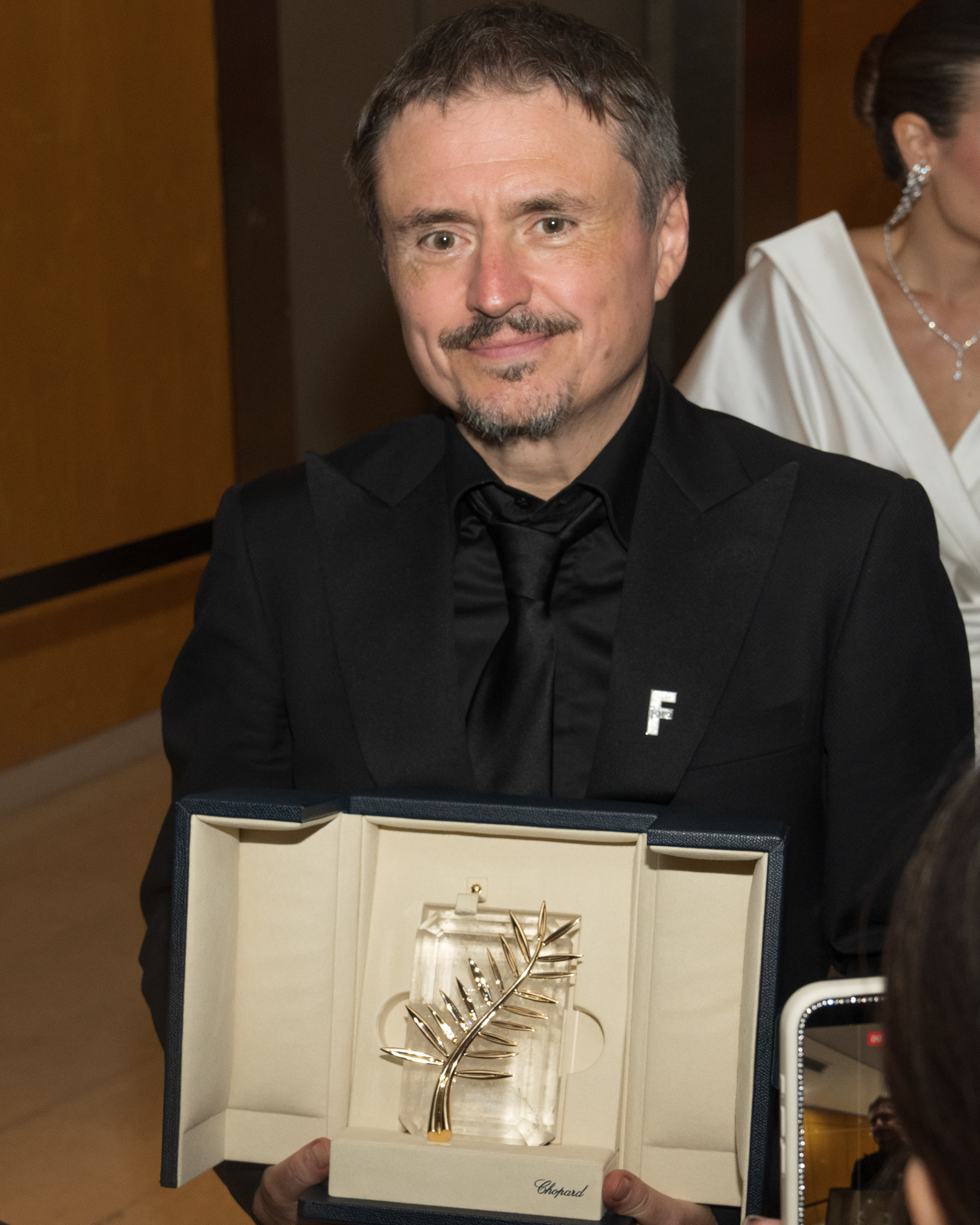
Cristian Mungiu won twice, in 2007 and 2026.

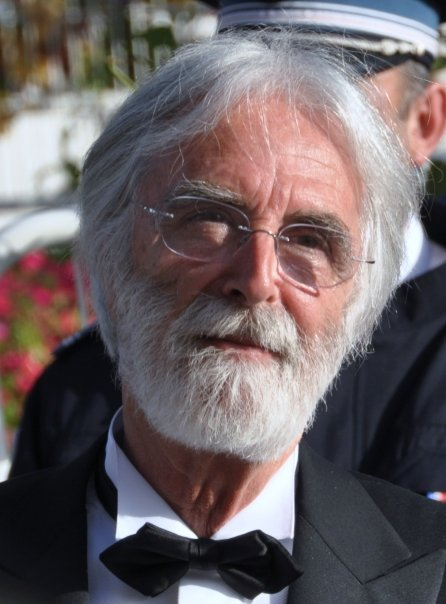
Michael Haneke won twice, in 2009 and 2012.

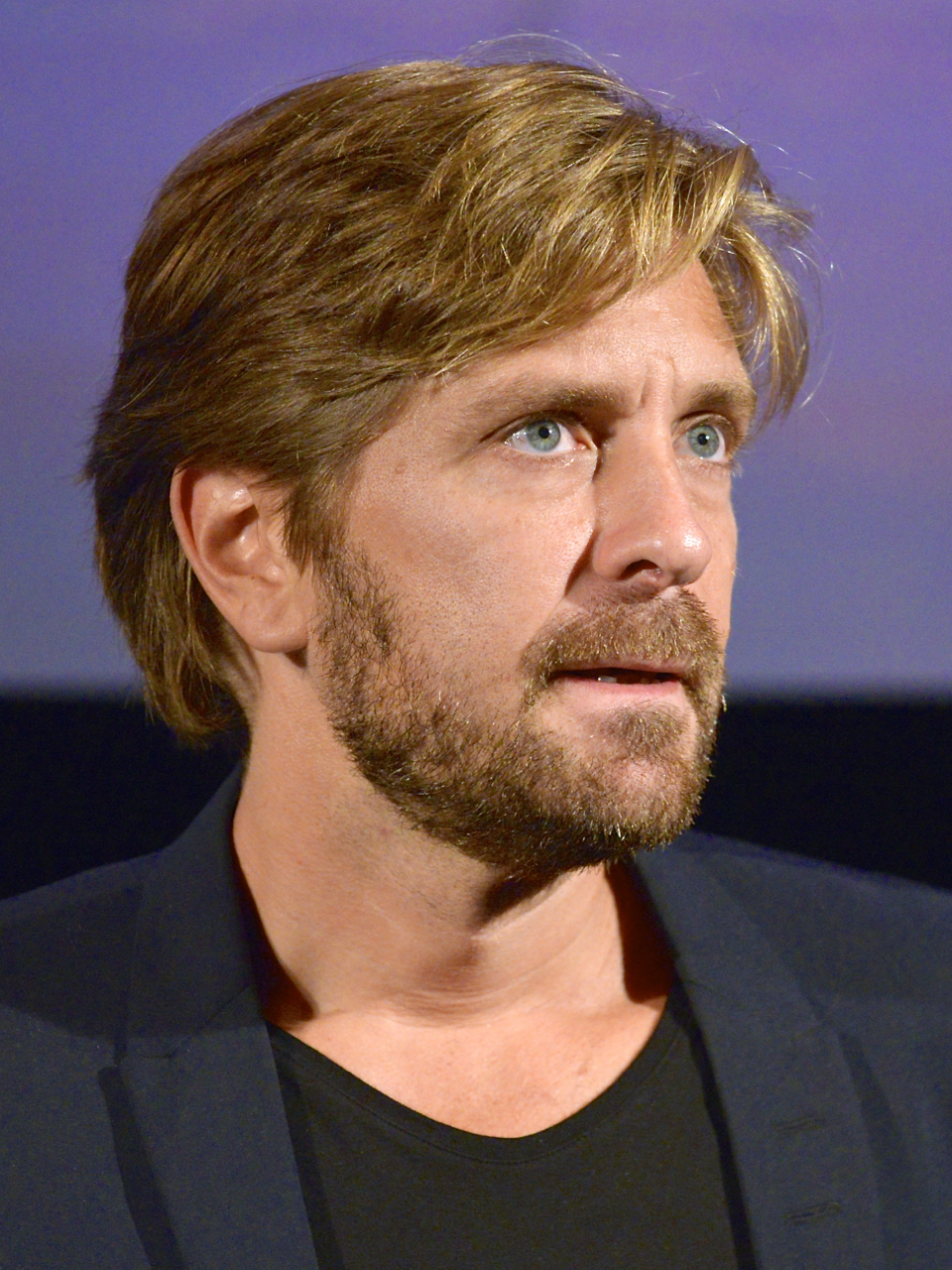
Ruben Östlund won twice, in 2017 and 2022.

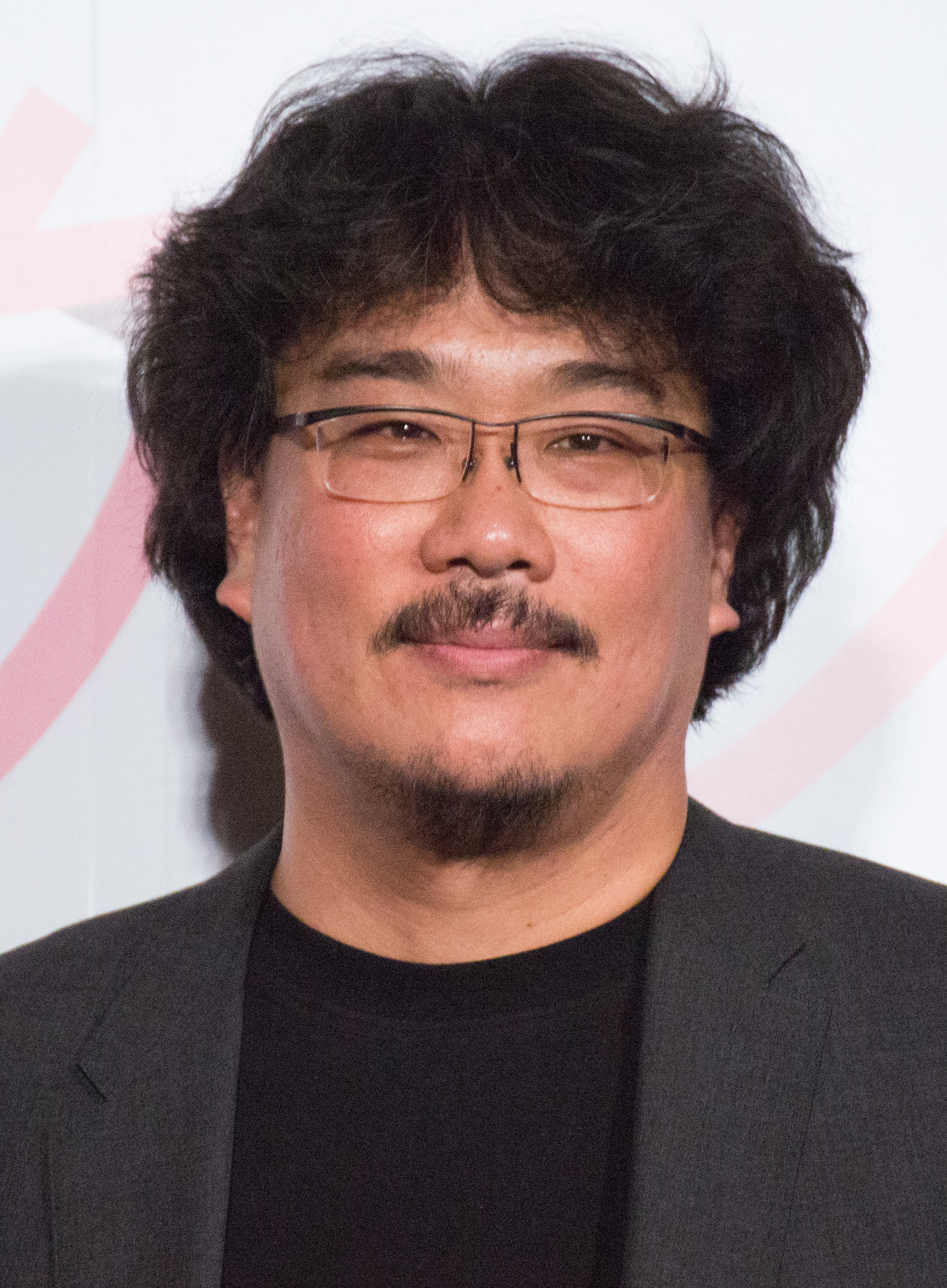
Bong Joon Ho won in 2019.

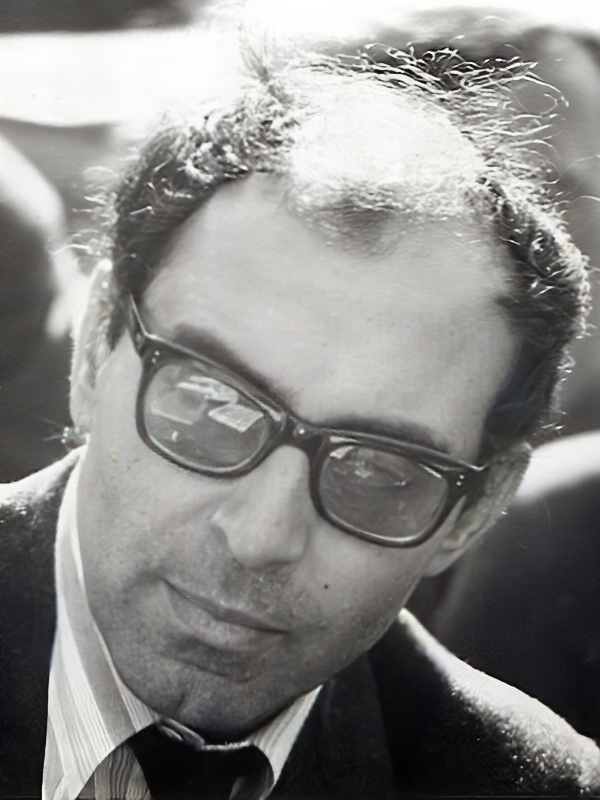
Jean-Luc Godard won the only "Special Palme d'Or" ever awarded, in 2018.

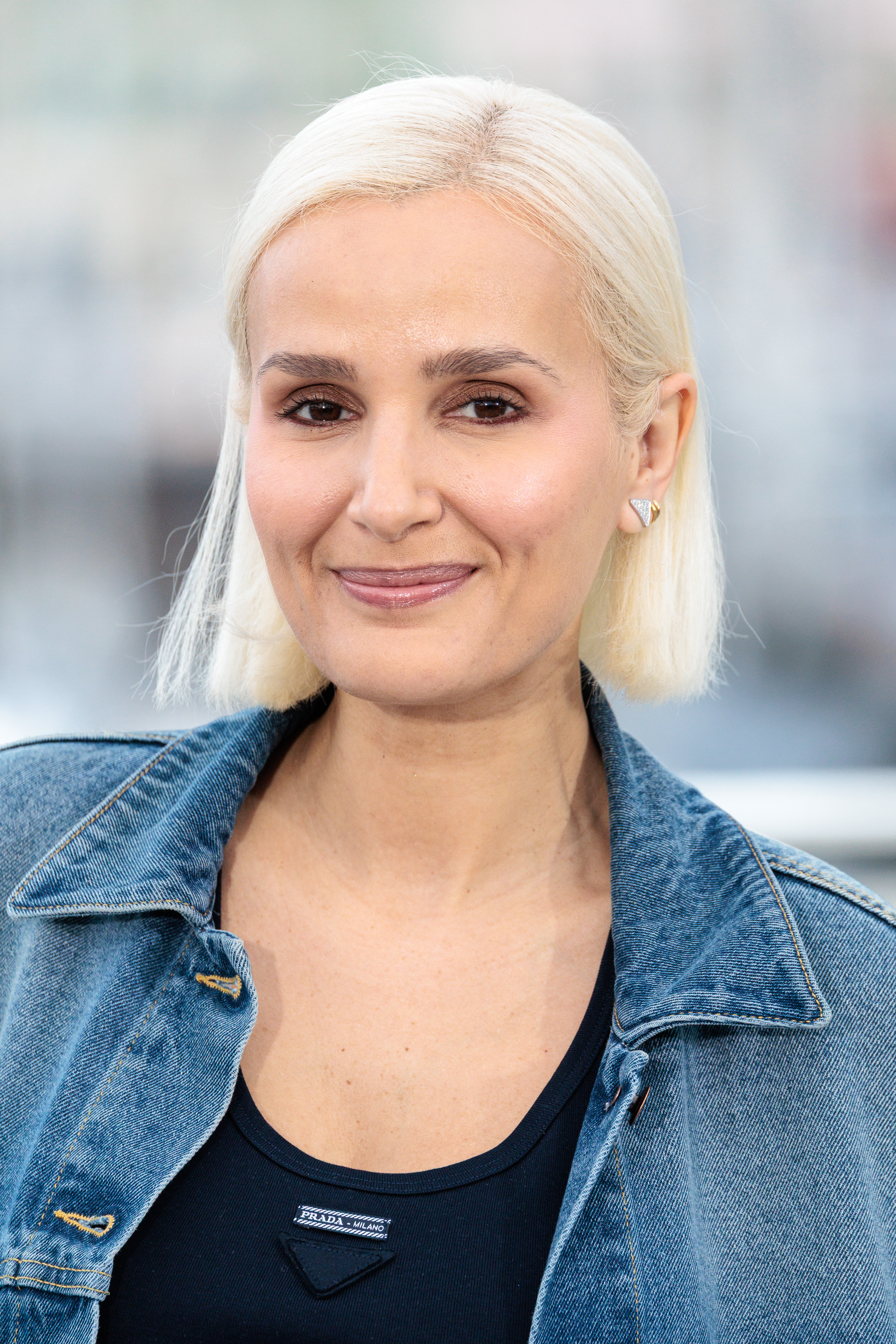
Julia Ducournau won in 2021, becoming the first woman to win it solo.

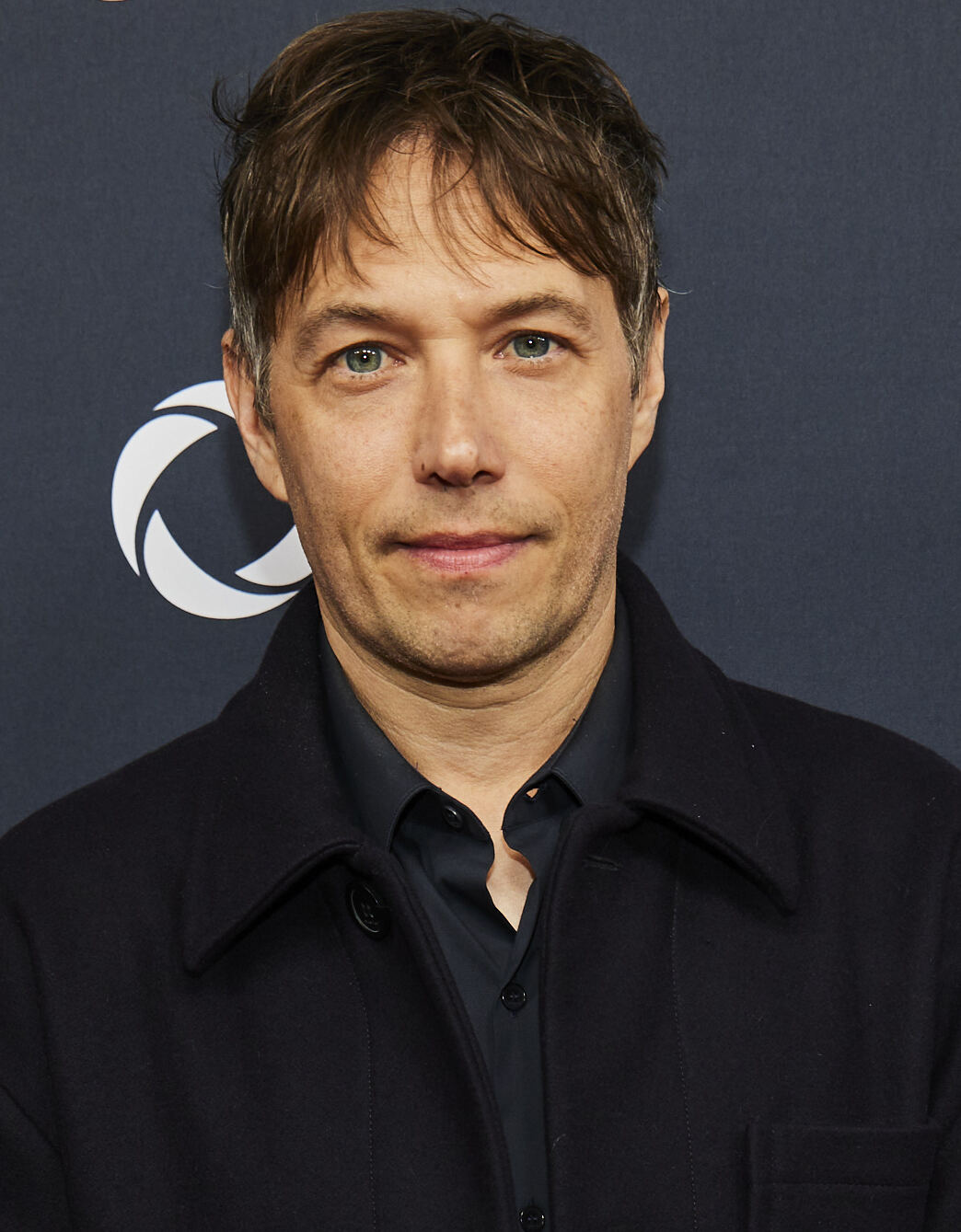
Sean Baker won in 2024.

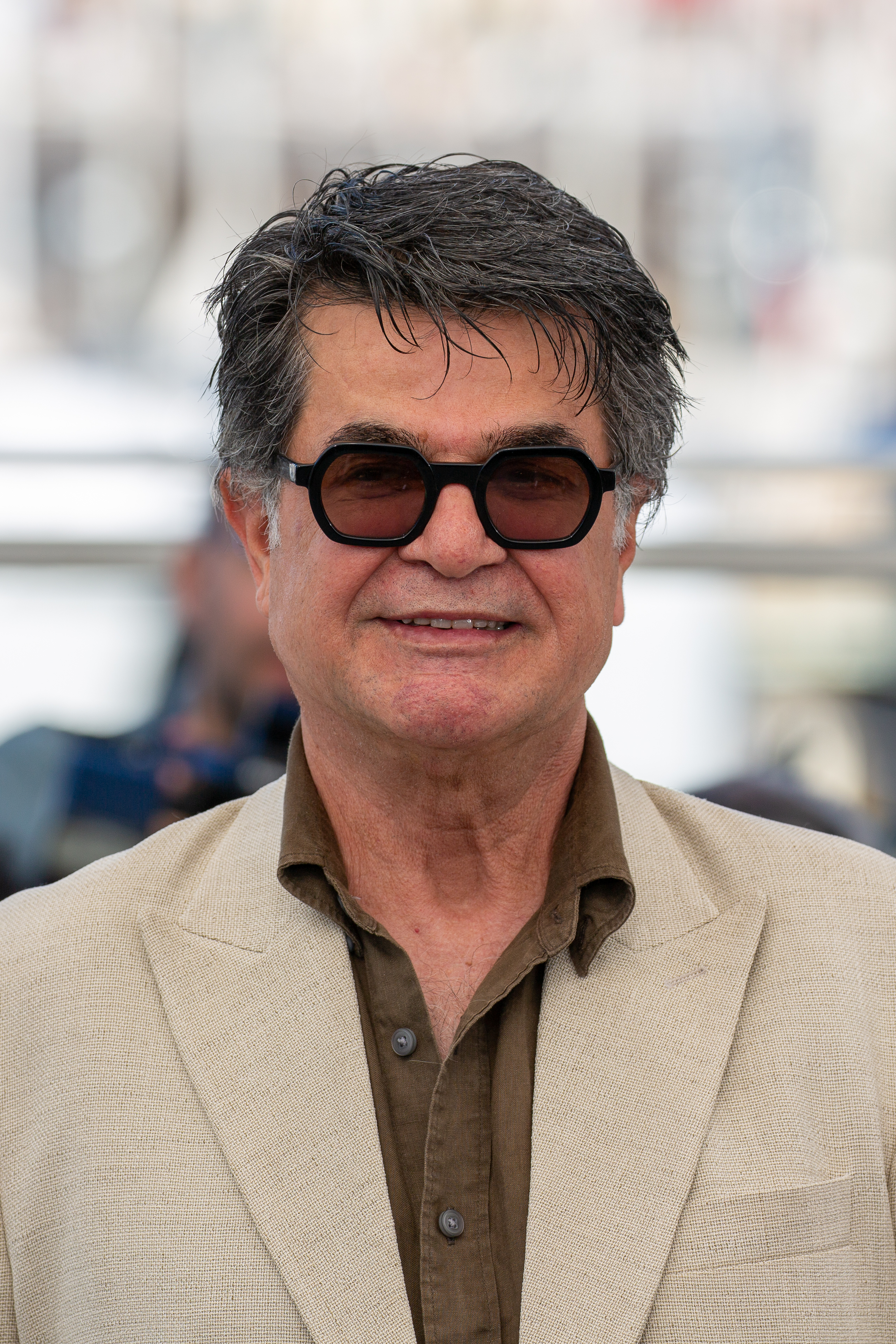
Jafar Panahi won in 2025.

=== 1940s ===
Year	English Title	Original Title	Recipient(s)	Production Country	Ref.
1939	The inaugural Cannes Film Festival was to have been held in 1939, but was cancelled due to the outbreak of the Second World War. (Note: The festival was not inaugurated until after the conclusion of the war. Sixty-three years later, the organizers of the 2002 festival assembled a jury of six members, including Dieter Kosslick and Alberto Barbera, to watch seven of the twelve features which had been entered into the 1939 competition, namely: Goodbye, Mr. Chips, La Loi du Nord, Lenin in 1918, The Four Feathers, The Wizard of Oz, Union Pacific, and Boefje. Union Pacific by Cecil B. DeMille was retrospectively voted the winner of the 1939 Palme d'Or.)				
1946	Brief Encounter		David Lean	United Kingdom	
1946	The Last Chance	Die Letzte Chance	Leopold Lindtberg	Switzerland	
1946	The Lost Weekend		Billy Wilder	United States	
1946	María Candelaria		Emilio Fernández	Mexico	
1946	Men Without Wings	Muži bez křídel	František Čáp	Czechoslovakia	
1946	Neecha Nagar		Chetan Anand	India	
1946	Pastoral Symphony	La symphonie pastorale	Jean Delannoy	France	
1946	The Red Meadows	De røde enge	Bodil Ipsen and Lau Lauritzen Jr.	Denmark	
1946	Rome, Open City	Roma, città aperta	Roberto Rossellini	Italy	
1946	Torment	Hets	Alf Sjöberg	Sweden	
1946	The Turning Point	Великий перелом	Fridrikh Ermler	Soviet Union	
1947	Antoine and Antoinette (Best Psychological & Love Film)	Antoine et Antoinette	Jacques Becker	France	
1947	Crossfire (Best Social Film)		Edward Dmytryk	United States	
1947	Dumbo (Best Animation Design)		Ben Sharpsteen	United States	
1947	The Damned (Best Adventure & Crime Film)	Les Maudits	René Clément	France	
1947	Ziegfeld Follies (Best Musical Comedy)		Vincente Minnelli	United States	
1949	The Third Man		Carol Reed	United Kingdom	

=== 1950s ===
Year	English Title	Original Title	Recipient(s)	Production Country	Ref.
1951	Miracle in Milan	Miracolo a Milano	Vittorio De Sica	Italy	
1951	Miss Julie	Fröken Julie	Alf Sjöberg	Sweden	
1952	Othello		Orson Welles	Italy, Morocco, United States	
1952	Two Cents Worth of Hope	Due soldi di speranza	Renato Castellani	Italy	
1953	The Wages of Fear	Le salaire de la peur	Henri-Georges Clouzot	France	
1954	Gate of Hell	地獄門	Teinosuke Kinugasa	Japan	
1955	Marty ^{§}		Delbert Mann	United States	
1956	The Silent World	Le monde du silence	Jacques Cousteau and Louis Malle	France	
1957	Friendly Persuasion		William Wyler	United States	
1958	The Cranes Are Flying	Летят журавли	Mikhail Kalatozov	Soviet Union	
1959	Black Orpheus ^{§}	Orfeu Negro	Marcel Camus	France, Brazil	

=== 1960s ===
Year	English Title	Original Title	Recipient(s)	Production Country	Ref.
1960	La dolce vita ^{§}		Federico Fellini	Italy	
1961	The Long Absence ^{§}	Une aussi longue absence	Henri Colpi	France	
1961	Viridiana ^{§}		Luis Buñuel	Spain	
1962	O Pagador de Promessas ^{§}		Anselmo Duarte	Brazil	
1963	The Leopard ^{§}	Il gattopardo	Luchino Visconti	Italy	
1964	The Umbrellas of Cherbourg	Les parapluies de Cherbourg	Jacques Demy	France	
1965	The Knack ...and How to Get It		Richard Lester	United Kingdom	
1966	The Birds, the Bees and the Italians	Signore e signori	Pietro Germi	Italy	
1966	A Man and a Woman	Un homme et une femme	Claude Lelouch	France	
1967	Blowup		Michelangelo Antonioni	United Kingdom	
1968	The festival was cancelled midway through to show solidarity with the students and workers who were demonstrating in what became known as the May 68 movement.				
1969	If....		Lindsay Anderson	United Kingdom	

=== 1970s ===
Year	English Title	Original Title	Recipient(s)	Production Country	Ref.
1970	M*A*S*H		Robert Altman	United States	
1971	The Go-Between		Joseph Losey	United Kingdom	
1972	The Mattei Affair ^{§}	Il caso Mattei	Francesco Rosi	Italy	
1972	The Working Class Goes to Heaven ^{§}	La classe operaia va in paradiso	Elio Petri	Italy	
1973	The Hireling		Alan Bridges	United Kingdom	
1973	Scarecrow		Jerry Schatzberg	United States	
1974	The Conversation		Francis Ford Coppola	United States	
1975	Chronicle of the Years of Fire	Chronique des années de braise	Mohammed Lakhdar-Hamina	Algeria	
1976	Taxi Driver		Martin Scorsese	United States	
1977	Padre Padrone		Paolo and Vittorio Taviani	Italy	
1978	The Tree of Wooden Clogs ^{§}	L'albero degli zoccoli	Ermanno Olmi	Italy	
1979	Apocalypse Now		Francis Ford Coppola	United States	
1979	The Tin Drum	Die Blechtrommel	Volker Schlöndorff	West Germany, France	

=== 1980s ===
Year	English Title	Original Title	Recipient(s)	Production Country	Ref.
1980	All That Jazz		Bob Fosse	United States	
1980	Kagemusha	影武者	Akira Kurosawa	Japan	
1981	Man of Iron	Człowiek z żelaza	Andrzej Wajda	Poland	
1982	Missing ^{§}		Costa-Gavras	United States	
1982	Yol ^{§}		Yılmaz Güney and Şerif Gören	Turkey	
1983	The Ballad of Narayama	楢山節考	Shōhei Imamura	Japan	
1984	Paris, Texas ^{§}		Wim Wenders	West Germany, France	
1985	When Father Was Away on Business ^{§}	Отац на службеном путу	Emir Kusturica	Yugoslavia	
1986	The Mission		Roland Joffé	United Kingdom, United States	
1987	Under the Sun of Satan ^{§}	Sous le soleil de Satan	Maurice Pialat	France	
1988	Pelle the Conqueror	Pelle Erobreren	Bille August	Denmark	
1989	Sex, Lies, and Videotape		Steven Soderbergh	United States	

=== 1990s ===
Year	English Title	Original Title	Recipient(s)	Production Country	Ref.
1990	Wild at Heart		David Lynch	United States	
1991	Barton Fink ^{§}		Joel Coen	United States	
1992	The Best Intentions	Den goda viljan	Bille August	Denmark, Sweden	
1993	Farewell My Concubine	霸王別姬	Chen Kaige	Hong Kong	
1993	The Piano		Jane Campion	New Zealand, Australia, France	
1994	Pulp Fiction		Quentin Tarantino	United States	
1995	Underground	Подземље	Emir Kusturica	Yugoslavia	
1996	Secrets & Lies		Mike Leigh	France, United Kingdom	
1997	The Eel	うなぎ	Shōhei Imamura	Japan	
1997	Taste of Cherry	طعم گيلاس	Abbas Kiarostami	Iran	
1998	Eternity and a Day ^{§}	Μια αιωνιότητα και μια μέρα	Theo Angelopoulos	Greece	
1999	Rosetta ^{§}		Jean-Pierre and Luc Dardenne	Belgium	

=== 2000s ===
Year	English Title	Original Title	Recipient(s)	Production Country	Ref.
2000	Dancer in the Dark		Lars von Trier	Denmark	
2001	The Son's Room	La stanza del figlio	Nanni Moretti	Italy	
2002	The Pianist		Roman Polanski	Poland, France, Germany, United Kingdom	
2003	Elephant		Gus Van Sant	United States	
2004	Fahrenheit 9/11		Michael Moore	United States	
2005	L'Enfant		Jean-Pierre and Luc Dardenne	Belgium, France	
2006	The Wind That Shakes the Barley ^{§}		Ken Loach	Ireland, United Kingdom, Italy, Germany	
2007	4 Months, 3 Weeks and 2 Days	4 luni, 3 săptămâni și 2 zile	Cristian Mungiu	Romania	
2008	The Class ^{§}	Entre les murs	Laurent Cantet	France	
2009	The White Ribbon	Das weiße Band	Michael Haneke	Germany, Austria, France	

=== 2010s ===
Year	English Title	Original Title	Recipient(s)	Production Country	Ref.
2010	Uncle Boonmee Who Can Recall His Past Lives	ลุงบุญมีระลึกชาติ	Apichatpong Weerasethakul	Thailand, France, Germany	
2011	The Tree of Life		Terrence Malick	United States	
2012	Amour		Michael Haneke	France, Germany, Austria	
2013	Blue Is the Warmest Colour ^{§}	La Vie d'Adèle: Chapitres 1 et 2	Abdellatif Kechiche, Léa Seydoux and Adèle Exarchopoulos (Note: In an unprecedented move, the jury also awarded the Palme d'Or to the film's two lead actress.)	France, Belgium, Spain	
2014	Winter Sleep	Kış Uykusu	Nuri Bilge Ceylan	Turkey, France, Germany	
2015	Dheepan		Jacques Audiard	France	
2016	I, Daniel Blake		Ken Loach	United Kingdom	
2017	The Square		Ruben Östlund	Sweden, Germany, France, Denmark	
2018	Shoplifters	万引き家族	Hirokazu Kore-eda	Japan	
2019	Parasite ^{§}	기생충	Bong Joon Ho	South Korea	

=== 2020s ===
Year	English Title	Original Title	Recipient(s)	Production Country	Ref.
2020	Festival cancelled due to the COVID-19 pandemic. 56 films were announced as official selections by the festival, but no awards were presented.				
2021	Titane		Julia Ducournau	France, Belgium	
2022	Triangle of Sadness		Ruben Östlund	Sweden, Germany, France, United Kingdom	
2023	Anatomy of a Fall	Anatomie d'une chute	Justine Triet	France	
2024	Anora		Sean Baker	United States	
2025	It Was Just an Accident	یک تصادف ساده	Jafar Panahi	Iran, France, Luxembourg	
2026	Fjord		Cristian Mungiu	Romania, Norway, Denmark, France, Sweden	

Notes
^{§} Denotes unanimous win

=== Special Palme d'Or ===
During the 2018 closing ceremony, the jury awarded a "Special Palme d'Or" for the first time ever. Even though the award was not intended to be an Honorary Palme d'Or to Jean-Luc Godard, the move was made as an homage to his career, and as an award to the film itself as well.

Year	English Title	Original Title	Director	Production Country	Ref.
2018	The Image Book	Le Livre d'image	Jean-Luc Godard	Switzerland, France	

== Wins by country ==
Country	Number of wins
France (Note: This does not include the Special Palme d'Or win for The Image Book.)	29
United States (Note: This does not include the retrospective win for Union Pacific.)	22
Italy	13
United Kingdom	13
Germany (Note: West Germany is included.)	10
Denmark	5
Japan	5
Sweden	5
Belgium	4
USSR	2
Brazil	2
Yugoslavia	2
Poland	2
Austria	2
Spain	2
Turkey	2
Iran	2
Romania	2
Czechoslovakia	1
India	1
Mexico	1
Switzerland	1
Morocco	1
Algeria	1
Australia	1
Hong Kong	1
New Zealand	1
Greece	1
Ireland	1
South Korea	1
Thailand	1
Luxembourg	1

== Multiple winners ==
Ten directors or director duos have won the award twice. Three of them (^{‡}) have won for consecutive films.

Number of wins	Directors	Nationality	Films
2	Alf Sjöberg	Sweden	Torment (1946), Miss Julie (1951)
2	Francis Ford Coppola	United States	The Conversation (1974), Apocalypse Now (1979)
2	Bille August ‡	Denmark	Pelle the Conqueror (1988), The Best Intentions (1992)
2	Emir Kusturica	Yugoslavia	When Father Was Away on Business (1985), Underground (1995)
2	Shōhei Imamura	Japan	The Ballad of Narayama (1983), The Eel (1997)
2	Jean-Pierre & Luc Dardenne	Belgium	Rosetta (1999), L'Enfant (2005)
2	Michael Haneke ‡	Austria	The White Ribbon (2009), Amour (2012)
2	Ken Loach	United Kingdom	The Wind That Shakes the Barley (2006), I, Daniel Blake (2016)
2	Ruben Östlund ‡	Sweden	The Square (2017), Triangle of Sadness (2022)
2	Cristian Mungiu	Romania	4 Months, 3 Weeks and 2 Days (2007), Fjord (2026)

== Honorary Palme d'Or ==
At the 1997 edition by the festival's organizing committee, on the occasion of the 50th anniversary of the Festival as the "Palme des Palmes", a homage to Swedish filmmaker Ingmar Bergman who had never been awarded a competitive Palme.

Since 2002, the festival awards the prize regularly to individuals who have achieved a notable body of work but who had never won a competitive Palme d'Or. In 2024, Studio Ghibli became the first and only studio to date to win it.

== See also ==
- List of actors who have appeared in multiple Palme d'Or winners
- Golden Bear, the highest prize awarded at the Berlin International Film Festival
- Golden Lion, the highest prize awarded at the Venice Film Festival
- Short Film Palme d'Or
