= Dražen Janković =

Serbian musician

- Дражен Јанковић
- Born: 1965; Sarajevo, PR Bosnia and Herzegovina, FPR Yugoslavia
- Died: 9 November 2018 (aged 52–53); Belgrade, Serbia
- Other names: Drale; Seid Mali Karajlić / Seid Little Karajlić; Herr Dralle Draugentaller
- Education: Sarajevo Second Gymnasium
- Occupations: Singer-songwriter; writer; aphorist; actor
- Years active: 1980–2018
- Relatives: Nenad Janković (brother)
- Musical career
- Genres: New Primitivism; Rock; Garage Rock; Rock and roll
- Instruments: keyboards; vocals; organ
- Label: Polis 1991

Dražen Janković (Serbian Cyrillic: Дражен Јанковић; 1965 – 9 November 2018), also known by his nickname Drale, was a Serbian musician, composer, writer and actor. He was a band member of Sarajevo-based rock band Zabranjeno Pušenje under pseudonyms Seid Mali Karajlić (or Seid Little Karajlić), and Belgrade-based band The No Smoking Orchestra as Herr Dralle Draugentaller. He was one of the prominent members of the New Primitivism movement in his hometown Sarajevo. His older brother is a Serbian musician and actor Nenad Janković.

As an actor, he has appeared in television series Top lista nadrealista (1989–1991) and Složna braća (1996), as well as in a documentary film Super 8 Stories (2001), directed by the award-winning Serbian filmmaker Emir Kusturica.

Janković was born in Sarajevo, SR Bosnia and Herzegovina, SFR Yugoslavia (nowadays Bosnia and Herzegovina) where he finished elementary school and the Second Sarajevo Gymnasium. His father Srđan was a linguist and a university professor of Oriental sciences at the University of Sarajevo's Faculty of Philosophy.

== Discography ==
Albums

- Opomena 1 (2006)
- Objašnjenja (2007)
- Opomena 3 (2010)

Zabranjeno pušenje

- Das ist Walter (1984)
- Dok čekaš sabah sa šejtanom (1985)
- Pozdrav iz zemlje Safari (1987)

== Filmography ==
Year	Title	Role	Notes
1989–1991	Top lista nadrealista (TV Series)	Supporting roles	Seasons 2, 3
1996	Složna braća (TV Series)	Nemanja 2	
2001	Super 8 Stories	Himself	Documentary

== Publications ==
- Privatni semafor: priče, pesme, aforizmi (2007)
- Privatni semafor II (2009)
- Privatni semafor 3: pesme (unknown)
- Privatni semafor 4: pesme (2011)
- Unca unca čudo – Putopis (2011)
- Priča sa ušća Save i Dunava iz Beograda (2016)
