= Boisset =

Boisset may refer to several communes in France:

- Boisset, Cantal
- Boisset, Hérault
- Boisset, Haute-Loire
- Boisset, a village part of the commune of Sainte-Enimie, in the Lozère département
- Boisset-et-Gaujac, in the Gard département
- Boisset-lès-Montrond, in the Loire département
- Boisset-les-Prévanches, in the Eure département
- Boisset-Saint-Priest, in the Loire département
- Boissets, in the Yvelines département
- Boissets, in the Eure département

== See also ==
- Boisset (surname)
- Boisset Collection
- Jean-Charles Boisset
- Boissey (disambiguation)
