= Super 8 Stories =

2001 film by Emir Kusturica

- Directed by: Emir Kusturica
- Produced by: Carlo Cresto-Dina, Raimond Goebel
- Edited by: Svetolik Zajc
- Music by: No Smoking Orchestra
- Release date: 2001
- Running time: 90 minutes
- Countries: Germany; Italy; Federal Republic of Yugoslavia
- Language: Serbo-Croatian

Super 8 Stories (Serbian: Супер 8 Прича, Super 8 pričа) is a documentary film about the band No Smoking Orchestra. It is directed by the award-winning Serbian filmmaker Emir Kusturica. The film won the Silver Plate of best documentary at Chicago International Film Festival in 2001.

== Cast ==
- Aleksandar Balaban .... Tuba
- Zoran Marjanović Čeda .... Drums
- Nenad Gajin Coce .... Guitar
- Goran Markovski Glava .... Bass
- Dražen Janković .... Keyboards
- Nele Karajlić .... Lead singer
- Emir Kusturica .... Guitar
- Stribor Kusturica .... Drums
- Zoran Milošević .... Accordion
- Nenad Petrović .... Saxophone
- Dejan Sparavalo .... Violin
- Joe Strummer .... himself
