= Nicostratos the Pelican =

2011 French comedy film

- Theatrical release poster
- French: Nicostratos le pélican
- Directed by: Olivier Horlait
- Written by: Éric Boisset; Olivier Horlait
- Starring: Emir Kusturica; Thibault Le Guellec
- Cinematography: Michel Amathieu
- Edited by: Serge Bourdeillettes
- Music by: Panagiotis Kalatzopoulos
- Distributed by: Warner Bros. Pictures
- Release date: 29 June 2011
- Running time: 92 minutes
- Country: France
- Languages: French; Greek

Nicostratos the Pelican (French: Nicostratos le pélican) is a 2011 French comedy film directed by Olivier Horlait, released 29 June 2011.

== Cast ==
- Emir Kusturica as Démosthène
- Thibault Le Guellec as Yannis
- François-Xavier Demaison as Aristote
- Jade-Rose Parker as Angeliki
- Gennadios Patsis as Popa Kosmas
- Valériane de Villeneuve as Mme Karoussos
