= Boissey =

Boissey may refer to several communes in France:

- Boissey, Ain
- Boissey, Calvados
- Boissey-le-Châtel

== See also ==
- Boisset (disambiguation)
