= Boisset (surname) =

Boisset is a surname. Notable people with the surname include:

- Éric Boisset (born 1965), French writer
- Jean-Charles Boisset (born 1969), French vintner
- Raymond Boisset (1912–1991), French sprinter
- Yves Boisset (1939–2025), French film director and scriptwriter
