= Boissets =

- Commune
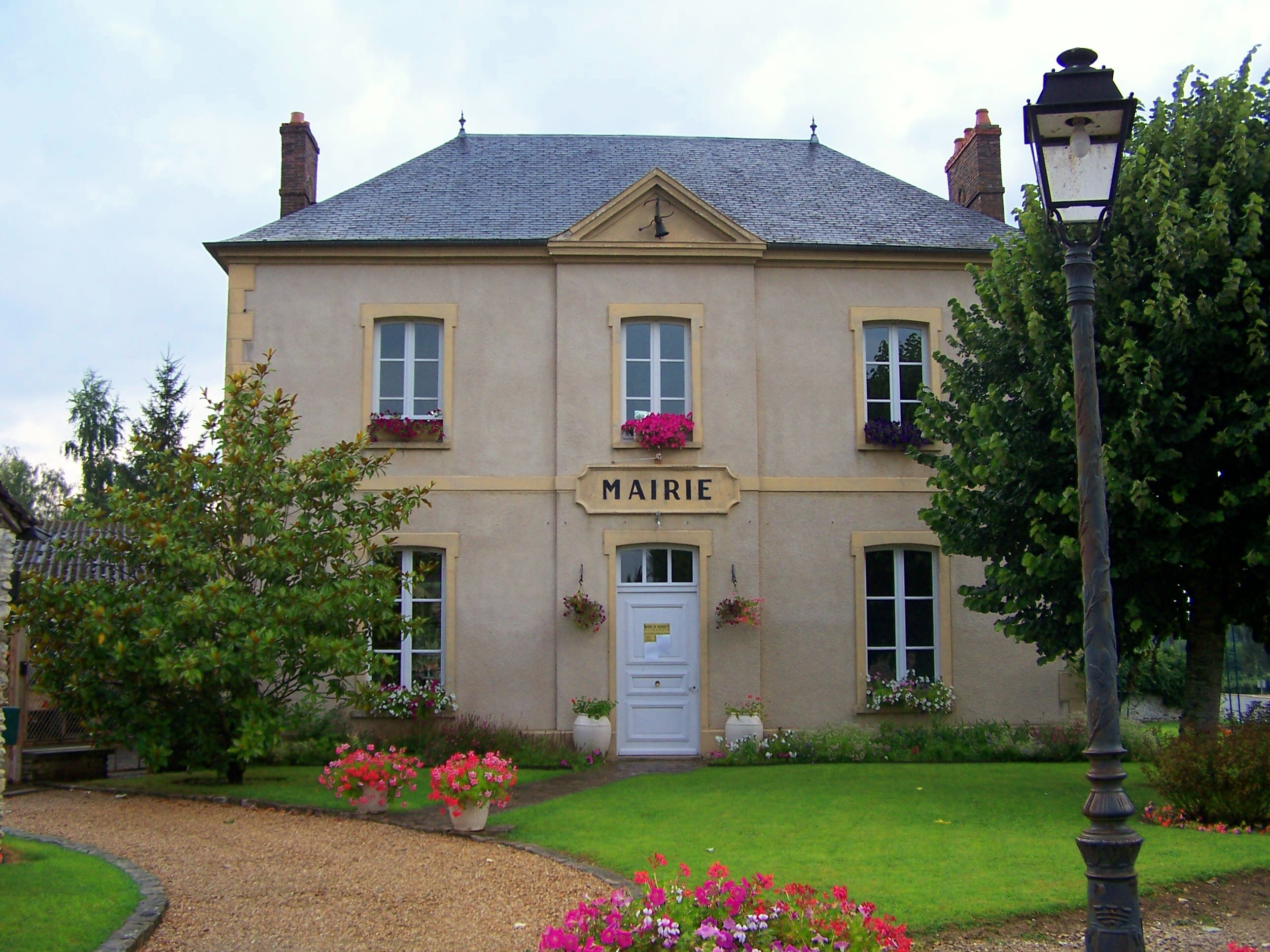
- Town hall
- Location of Boissets
- Location within France Location within Île-de-France (region)
- Coordinates: 48°51′43″N 1°35′02″E
- Country: France
- Region: Île-de-France
- Department: Yvelines
- Arrondissement: Mantes-la-Jolie
- Canton: Bonnières-sur-Seine
- Intercommunality: Pays houdanais

Government
  - Mayor (2020–2026): Thierry Maillier
- Area^{1}: 3.90 km^{2} (1.51 sq mi)
- Elevation: 123 m (404 ft)
- Highest elevation: 151 m (495 ft)
- Lowest elevation: 105 m (344 ft)
- Population (2023): 301
  - Density: 77.2/km^{2} (200/sq mi)
- Time zone: UTC+01:00 (CET)
  - Summer (DST): UTC+02:00 (CEST)
- INSEE/Postal code: 78076 /78910
- ^{1} French Land Register data, which excludes lakes, ponds, glaciers > 1 km^{2} (0.386 sq mi or 247 acres) and river estuaries.

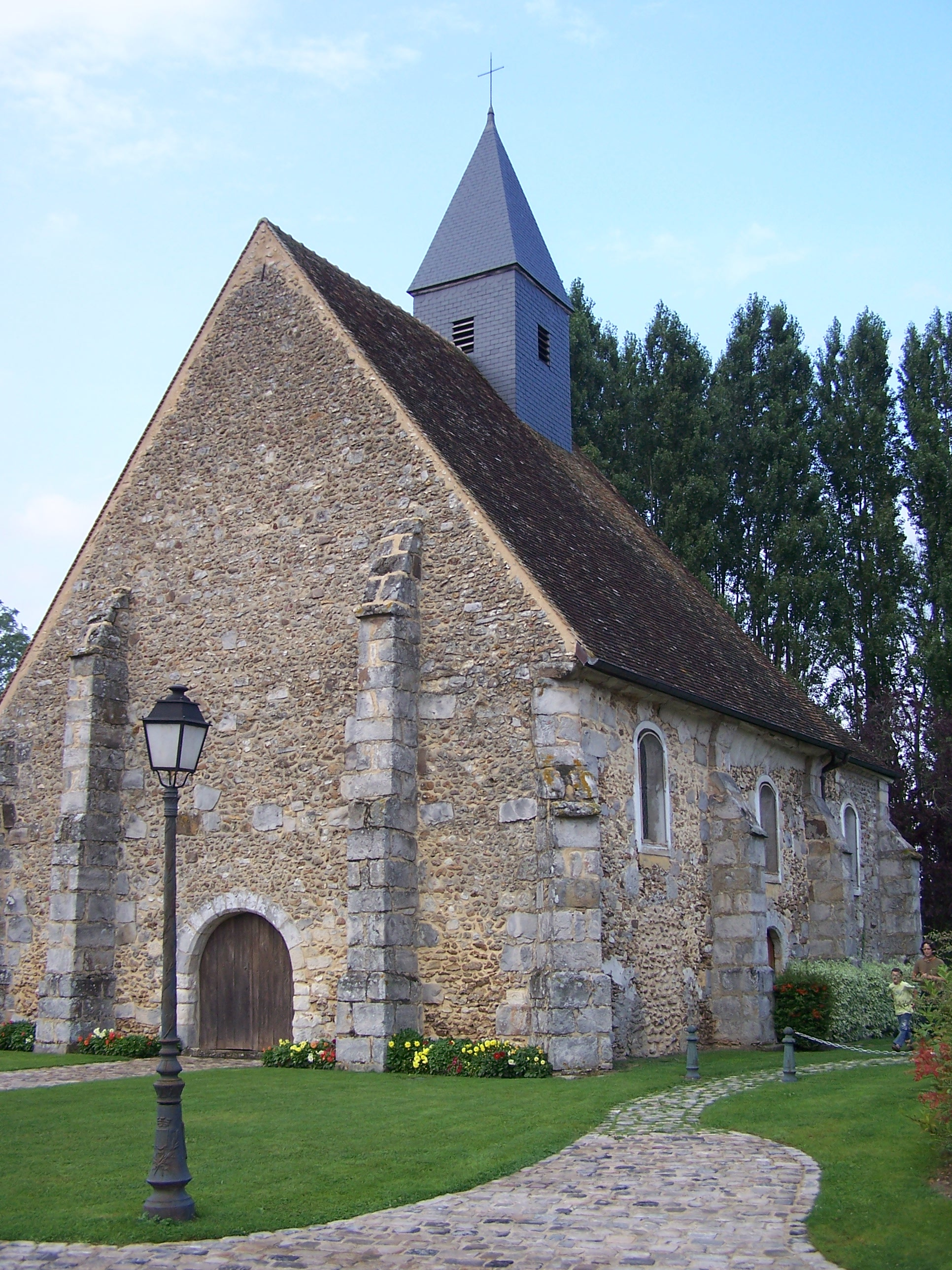
Saint-Hilaire

Boissets (French pronunciation: [bwasɛ]) is a commune in the Yvelines department in north-central France.

== See also ==
- Communes of the Yvelines department
