= Emir Kusturica =

Serbian film director, writer, and musician (born 1954)

- Емир Кустурица
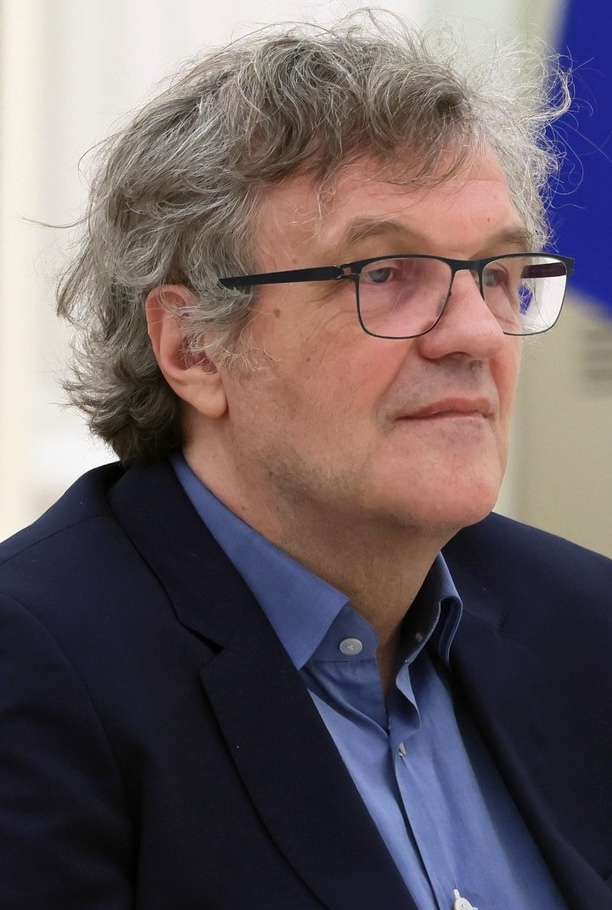
- Kusturica in 2024
- Born: 24 November 1954 (age 71); Sarajevo, PR Bosnia and Herzegovina, FPR Yugoslavia
- Other name: Nemanja Kusturica (since 1995)
- Occupations: Film director, screenwriter, musician
- Years active: 1978–present
- Spouse: Maja Mandić
- Children: 2
- Website: thenosmokingorchestra.com

Emir Kusturica (Serbian Cyrillic: Емир Кустурица, pronounced [ě.mir ˈku.stu.ri.tsa]; born 24 November 1954) is a Serbian film director, screenwriter, actor, film producer and musician. Kusturica has been an active filmmaker since the 1980s.

He has competed at the Cannes Film Festival on five occasions and won the Palme d'Or twice (for When Father Was Away on Business and Underground), as well as the Best Director prize for Time of the Gypsies. Kusturica has won a Silver Bear at the Berlin Film Festival for Arizona Dream, a Silver Lion at the Venice Film Festival for Black Cat, White Cat and a Silver Lion for Best First Work for Do You Remember Dolly Bell?. He has also been made a Commander of the French Ordre des Arts et des Lettres. Kusturica has been a member of the Academy of Sciences and Arts of the Republika Srpska since 9 November 2011. Among other accolades, Kusturica became a UNICEF ambassador in 2002 and eight years later he was made a chevalier of the Legion of Honour in France.

Kusturica has also been recognized for his projects in town-building. Since the mid-2000s, Kusturica's primary residence has been in Drvengrad, a town built for his film Life Is a Miracle, in the Mokra Gora region of Serbia. He had portions of the historic village reconstructed for the film. He published an autobiography "Smrt je neprovjerena glasina" ('Death Is an Unverified Rumour') in 2010, which was followed by four other books.

== Early life ==
Kusturica was born in Sarajevo, the son of Murat Kusturica, a journalist employed at Sarajevo's Secretariat of Information, and Senka (née Numankadić), a court secretary. Emir grew up as the only child of a Muslim secular family in Sarajevo, the capital of PR Bosnia and Herzegovina, then a constituent republic within FPR Yugoslavia. As he writes in 1993, his father's mother was "strongly tied to Muslim rites" while his father "did not belong to any cult, he was not religious at all". Kusturica primarily defined himself as Yugoslavian at least until the year 2000.

A lively youth, Kusturica was by his own admission a borderline delinquent while growing up in the Sarajevo neighbourhood of Gorica. Through his father's friendship with the well-known director Hajrudin "Šiba" Krvavac, Kusturica, aged seventeen, got a small part in Krvavac's Walter Defends Sarajevo, a 1972 partisan film funded by the Yugoslav state.

== Work ==
In 1978, Kusturica graduated from the film school (FAMU) at the Academy of Performing Arts in Prague, which is why he is sometimes considered a part of the Prague film school, an informal group of Yugoslav film directors who studied at FAMU and shared similar influences and aesthetics. After graduating from FAMU, Kusturica began directing made-for-TV short films in Yugoslavia.

=== 1980s ===
He made his feature film debut in 1981 with Do You Remember Dolly Bell?, a coming-of-age drama that won the prestigious Golden Lion for Best First Work at that year's Venice Film Festival. The same year, at age 27, he became a lecturer at the newly established Academy of Performing Arts in Sarajevo, a job he held until 1988. He was also art director of Open Stage Obala (Otvorena scena Obala).

Kusturica's second feature film, When Father Was Away on Business (1985), earned a Palme d'Or at Cannes and five Yugoslav movie awards, as well as a nomination for an American Academy Award for Best Foreign Film. In 1989 he earned more accolades for Time of the Gypsies, a film about Romani culture and the exploitation of their youth. In 1989 he was a member of the jury at the 16th Moscow International Film Festival.

=== 1990s ===
Kusturica continued to make highly regarded films into the next decade, including his American debut, the absurdist comedy Arizona Dream (1993).

He won the Palme d'Or for his black comedy epic Underground (1995), based upon a scenario of Dušan Kovačević, a noted Serbian playwright. Underground was partly financed by state-owned Yugoslav television. It recounted the history of Yugoslavia from World War II until the conflicts during the 1990s. Bosnian and French critics claimed the film contained pro-Serb propaganda. Sarajevo-born novelist Aleksandar Hemon, who emigrated to the United States before the war, said Underground downplayed Serbian atrocities by presenting "the Balkan war as a product of collective, innate, savage madness." French philosopher and writer Alain Finkielkraut, a supporter of the Croatian president Franjo Tuđman during the 1990s, denounced the Cannes Film Festival's jury award, saying it was honouring a creator with a thriving imagination and that the jury praised a version of the most hackneyed and deceitful Serb propaganda. It was later revealed that Finkielkraut had not seen the film before writing his criticism.

French philosopher Bernard-Henri Lévy made a film criticizing Underground. In a discussion with Levy, the Slovenian philosopher Slavoj Žižek said: I hope we share another point, which is – to be brutal – hatred of [director] Emir Kusturica. Underground is one of the most horrible films that I've seen. What kind of Yugoslav society do you see in Kusturica's Underground? A society where people fornicate, drink, fight – a kind of eternal orgy.

Emir Kusturica taught Film Directing at Columbia University's Graduate Film Division.

In 1998, he won the Venice Film Festival's Silver Lion for Best Direction for Black Cat, White Cat, a farcical comedy set in a Gypsy (Romani) settlement on the banks of the Danube. The music for the film was composed by the Belgrade-based band No Smoking Orchestra.

=== 2000s ===
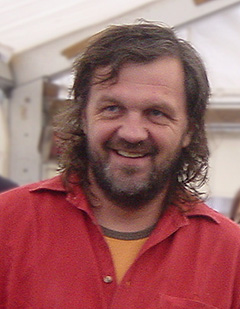
Emir Kusturica in Brussels, during the Philippe Rotthier awards, November 2005.

In 2001, Kusturica directed Super 8 Stories, a documentary road and concert movie about The No Smoking Orchestra, of which he is a band member. He was appointed President of the Jury of the 2005 Cannes Film Festival. His film Maradona by Kusturica, a documentary on Argentine football star Diego Maradona, was released in Italy in May 2007. It premiered in France during the Cannes Film Festival in 2008. His film Promise Me This premiered at the 2007 Cannes Film Festival. In June 2007, Kusturica directed the music video to Manu Chao's single "Rainin in Paradize", from the latter's La Radiolina album.

In 2002 Kusturica became a UNICEF National Ambassador for Serbia.

Since January 2008 he has organized the annual private Küstendorf Film Festival. Its first installment was held at Drvengrad/Küstendorf, a village built for his film Life Is a Miracle, from 14 to 21 January 2008. His next film, Cool Water, is a comedy set against the background of a Middle East conflict. Filming started in November 2010 in Germany.

=== 2010s ===
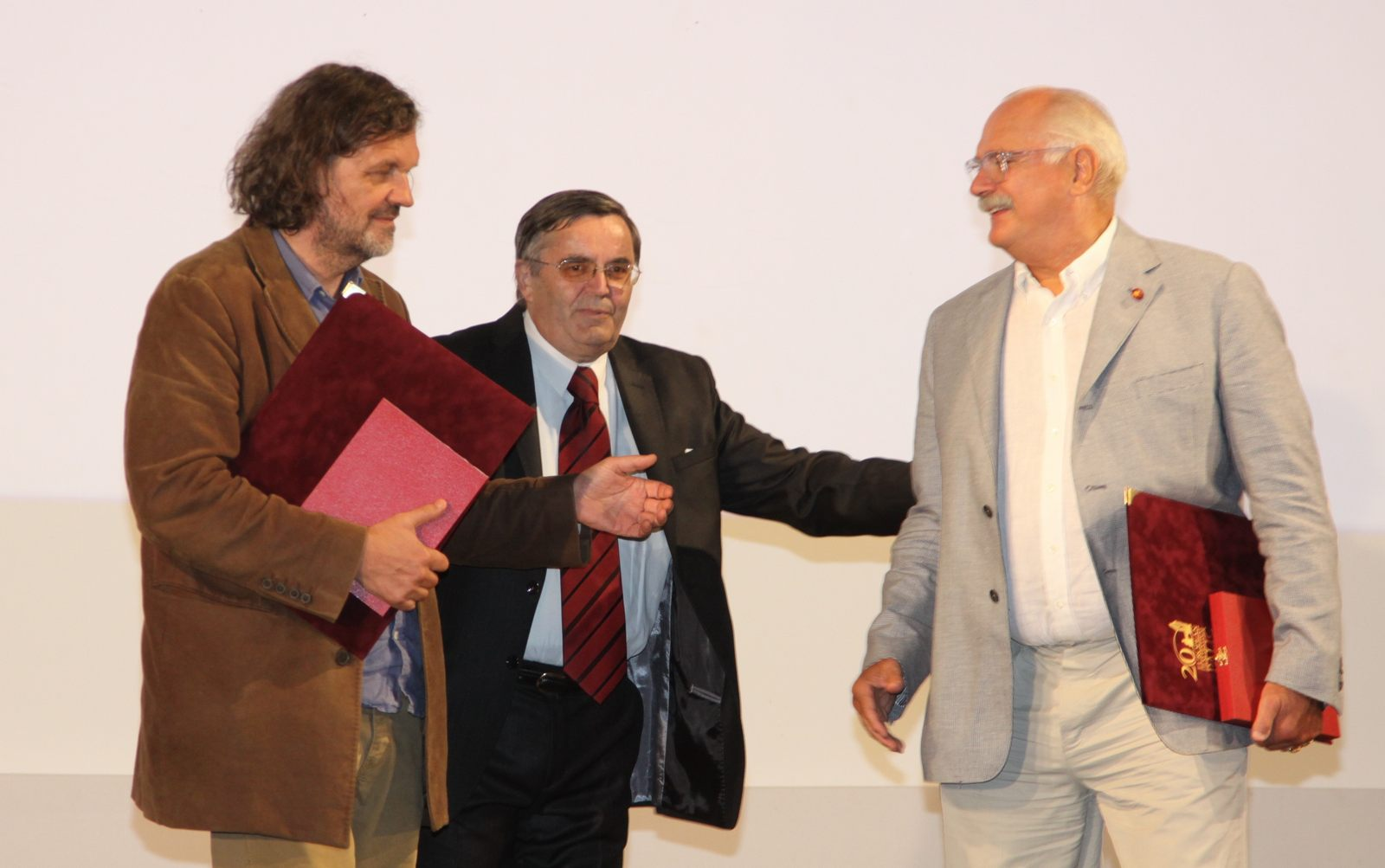
Kusturica with Nikita Mikhalkov (2014)

Andrej Nikolaidis, a Montenegrin writer and columnist, criticized Kusturica for appearing to agree with Slobodan Milošević's propaganda during the Bosnian War. Kusturica sued Nikolaidis and the Monitor newspaper for civil damages at the Supreme Court of Montenegro. In the end, Nikolaidis was ordered to pay $6,490 to Kusturica for calling the famed director a "media star of Milosevic's war machinery". The judge ruled that the evidence was not credible enough. In the end Nikolaidis and the paper were fined 12,000 euros for breaking the code of journalism by calling Kusturica "stupid, ugly and corrupt" in the article.

In October 2010, Kusturica withdrew from the jury of Antalya Golden Orange Film Festival after being publicly criticized and accused by Turkish director Semih Kaplanoğlu and Turkey's minister of culture Ertuğrul Günay over his alleged remarks and opinions about the Bosnian War. The criticism of Kusturica was started by an organization called the Turkish-Bosnian Cultural Federation as soon as Kusturica was announced as a jury member. Turkish media reported that Kusturica repeatedly downplayed the number of people killed and the rape of Muslim women during the war. The daily newspaper Milliyet said Kusturica denied the allegations. Public sentiment in Turkey and in Serbia was such that a couple of days after Kusturica left Turkey, there were unsubstantiated news reports by Serbian tabloids claiming that a mob of Turkish youths in Antalya physically assaulted Swiss actor Michael Neuenschwander (in town to promote his movie 180° – Wenn deine Welt plötzlich Kopf steht) because they mistook him for Kusturica due to apparent physical resemblances between the two. Later, Neuenschwander's press agent said there was no physical assault and that Neuenschwander was verbally abused by a small group. Kusturica later commented on the incident:

I did receive a sincere apology from the mayor of Antalya Mustafa Akaydın over what happened. Essentially, I became collateral damage in the ongoing political fight between the central powers from the ruling coalition in Istanbul and the municipal authorities in Antalya where the local power is held by a social-democrat party. But regardless of everything, this is completely unacceptable on a basic level – when you're an invited guest somewhere, your hosts simply cannot behave in this manner. And this run-in I had was with a part of Turkish society, the part that consists of highly-evolved primitives. I am not a politician and I'm not obliged to comment on and dissect every crime or genocide around the world. And then I got very angry and I told them if they're so sensitive about genocide it would be much better for them to publicly condemn the genocide they committed against the Armenian people, before having a go at me with accusatory statements. I clearly condemned the crimes in Bosnia, but the 'problem' is that I condemned the crimes committed by all sides, which makes me incompatible with the strategy they have for Bosnia.

At the 64th Cannes Film Festival, held 11–22 May 2011, Kusturica presided over the jury of the Un Certain Regard section of the festival's official selection. On 14 May, in Cannes, he was invested with the insignia of Chevalier of the Legion of Honour, France's highest decoration.

In September 2012, Kusturica accepted an offer to be the head juror of the first Saint Petersburg International Film Festival. During the festival he also performed for the residents and guests of Saint Petersburg with his band The No Smoking Orchestra.

Kusturica was awarded the Order of St. Sava, First Class, for his "selfless care and presentation of the Serbian nation in the world", on 12 May 2012.

During the last months of 2013, Kusturica started shooting a documentary on the life of Uruguayan president José Mujica, whom he considers "the last hero of politics". El Pepe: A Supreme Life was released in 2018.

=== 2020s ===
Kusturica announced that he will be filming his next project in Moscow. The film will be based on works of Russian writers Dostoyevski, Gogol and Tolstoy. It is titled Just One More Time. He was also planning to direct, in 2024, The Engineer of Easy Walks to be shot in Sochi.

=== Acting ===
After numerous film cameo appearances over the years, Kusturica's first sizable acting role was in The Widow of St. Pierre, a 2000 movie by director Patrice Leconte, as a convict on the French island colony of Saint Pierre.

In 2002, Kusturica appeared as an electric guitar player/security specialist in The Good Thief, directed by Neil Jordan.

In the French movie L'affaire Farewell (2009), he played the role of a KGB agent, Colonel Sergei Gregoriev.

In On the Milky Road (2016), he played Kosta, a milkman and falconer.

== Musical career ==
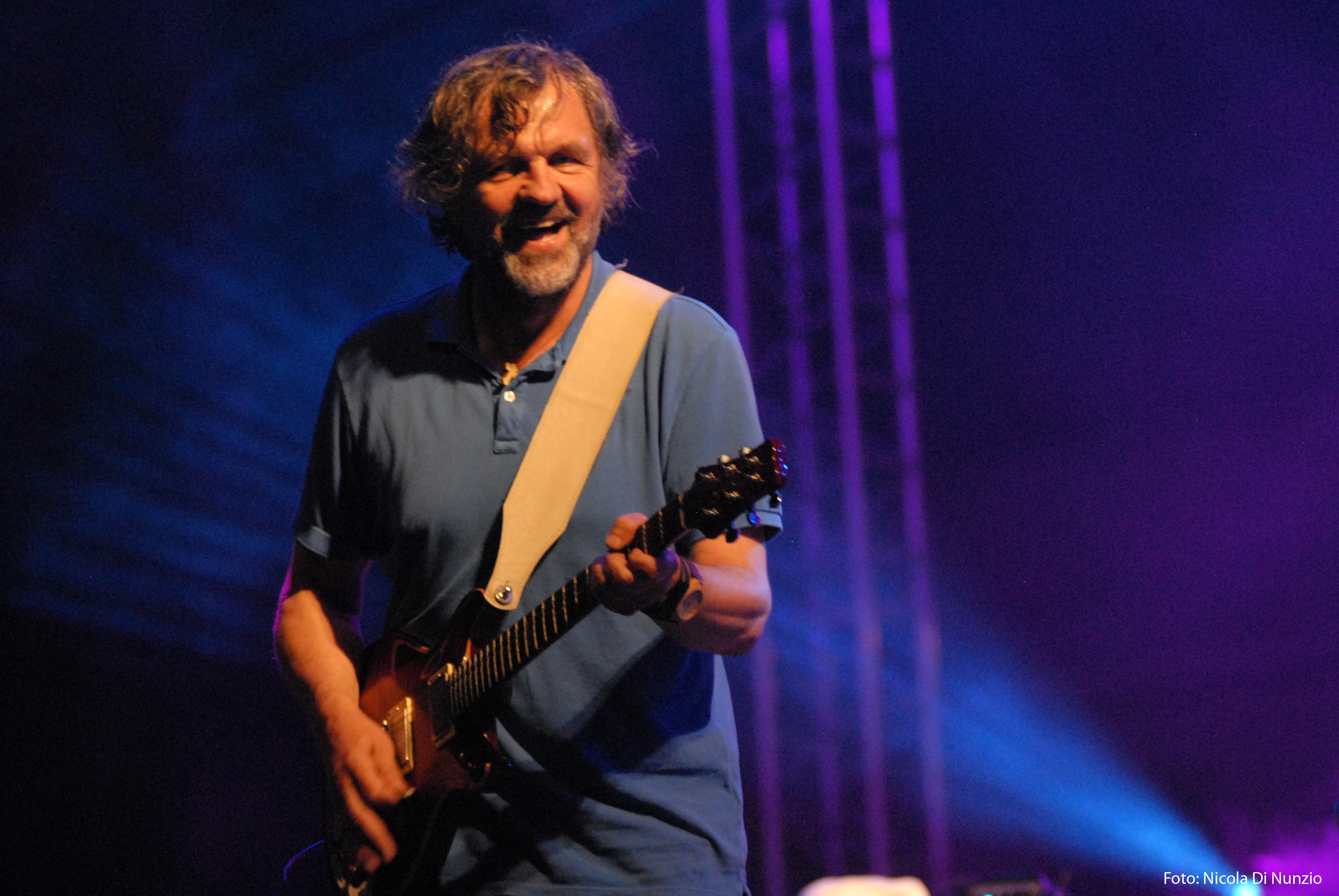
Kusturica performing with The No Smoking Orchestra in March 2017.

In mid-1986, thirty-one-year-old Kusturica started playing bass guitar in Zabranjeno Pušenje, a Sarajevan punk/garage rock outfit and part of the New Primitivism movement. Kusturica, an already established and celebrated Palm d'Or-winning film director, joined the band just after Zabranjeno Pušenje frontman Nele Karajlić had caused a media scandal that led to his legal prosecution on the verbal offence grounds and the band being shadow banned in the Yugoslav media, all of which hurt its commercial prospects and led to three of the six members leaving the group.

Kusturica ended up playing bass on three track from the band's third studio album Pozdrav iz zemlje Safari and composing one of the songs as well as directing a music video for the track "Manijak" off the album. Though never fully involved in the band's day-to-day activities, Kusturica left Zabranjeno Pušenje in 1988 once the filming of Time of the Gypsies began.

Kusturica returned to the group in the late 1990s following the Black Cat, White Cat film and the band's name changed to Emir Kusturica & The No Smoking Orchestra. In 1999, the No Smoking Orchestra recorded a new album, Unza Unza Time, produced by the Universal record company, as well as a music video, directed by Emir Kusturica. The band has been touring internationally since 1999. The musician and composer Goran Bregović has composed music for three of Kusturica's films: Time of the Gypsies, Arizona Dream, which featured Iggy Pop; and Underground.

== Writing ==
=== Death is an Unverified Rumour ===
Kusturica's autobiography, Death is an Unverified Rumour (Смрт је непровјерена гласина / Smrt je neprovjerena glasina), was published in October 2010 in Belgrade by Novosti. The launch took place on 26 October during the Belgrade Book Fair and was attended by Nele Karajlić, Dušan Kovačević, foreign minister Vuk Jeremić, Vojislav Koštunica, etc. Initially released only in Serbia, Montenegro, and Republika Srpska, the book's first printing of 20,000 copies quickly sold out. The second printing of 32,000 copies was out in November and it too sold within weeks. On 8 December, the third printing in 40,000 copies was out and promoted a day later at Belgrade's Dom Sindikata. In February 2011, a fourth printing with further 10,000 copies was out and soon the sale of the 100,000th book was announced. The final number of copies sold by the publisher was 114,000.

Translations were published in Italy (translated by Alice Parmeggiani) on 30 March 2011 under the title Dove sono in questa storia ("Where am I in this Story"), in France by JC Lattès on 6 April 2011 as Où suis-je dans cette histoire ?, and in Germany in September 2011 as Der Tod ist ein unbestätigtes Gerücht. In 2012, the book was published in Bulgaria as Cмъpттa e нeпoтвъpдeн cлуx, in Greece as Κι εγώ πού είμαι σ' αυτή την ιστορία;, in Romania as Unde sunt eu în toată povestea asta, and in Hungary as Hogy jövök én a képbe?.

=== Hundred Pains ===
Kusturica's second book was a novel, Hundred Pains (Сто јада / Sto jada), released in Serbia on 24 April 2013 by Novosti a.d. in the initial printing of 35,000 copies. On 6 June, the second printing came out in the circulation of 25,000. The book's translated form was released in France in January 2015 by JC Lattès as Étranger dans le mariage.

=== Why Did I Need This ===
His third book, a diary titled Why Did I Need This (Шта ми ово треба / Šta mi ovo treba) was published in October 2018 and for the first time presented at the Belgrade Book Fair.

=== Vidiš li da ne vidim ===
In 2022, Kusturica published a book titled Vidiš li da ne vidim. The main protagonists of the book are the author and his friend and Austrian Nobel laureate novelist Peter Handke.

=== Kada mrtve duše marširaju ===
His fifth book, Kada mrtve duše marširaju (When the dead souls march) was published in 2023.

== Other endeavors ==
=== Drvengrad ===
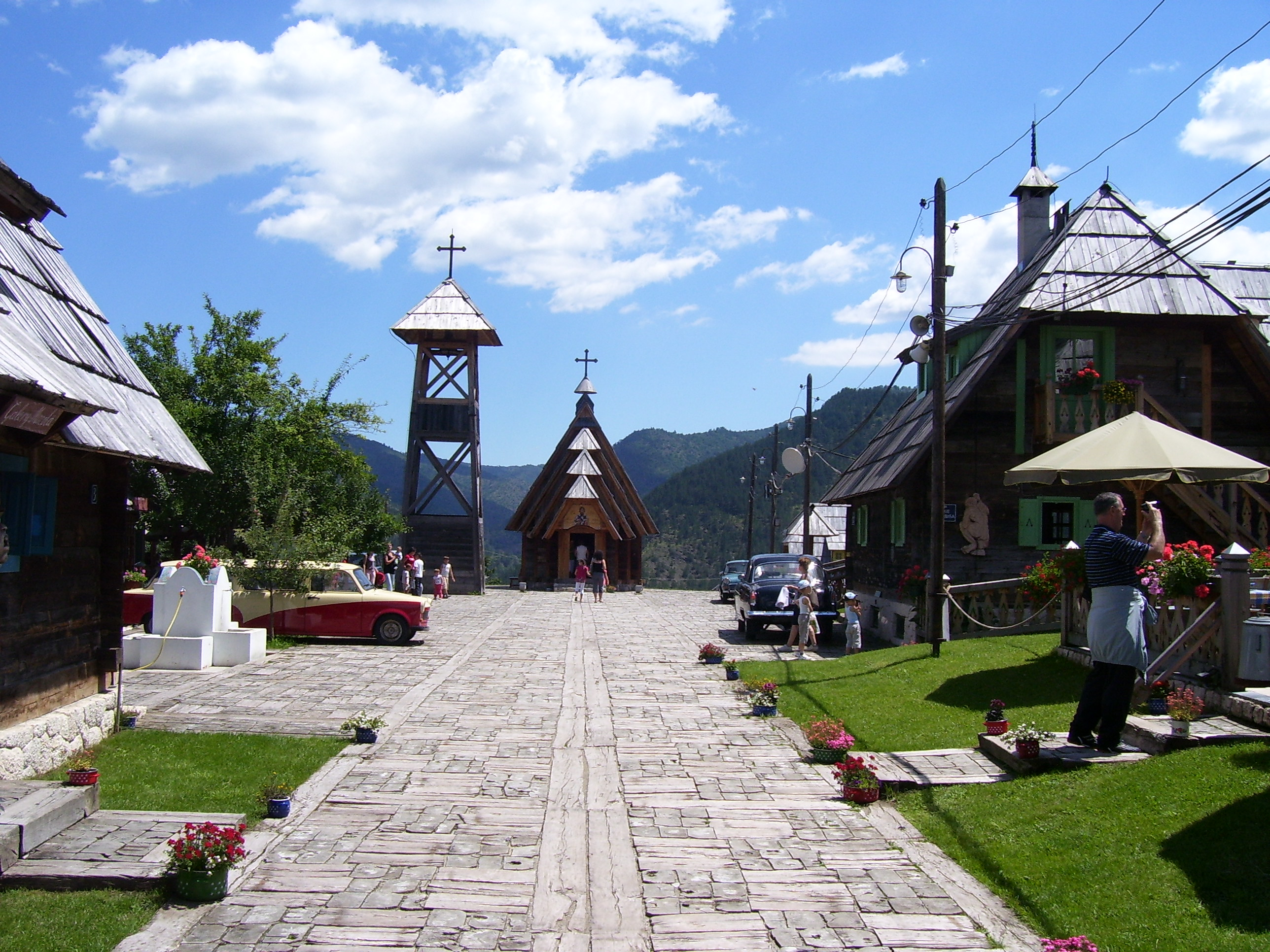
Drvengrad

Drvengrad (meaning 'Wooden Town') is a traditional village that Kusturica built for his film Life Is a Miracle. It is located in the Zlatibor District near the city of Užice, two hundred kilometers southwest of Serbia's capital, Belgrade. It is located near Mokra Gora and Višegrad, best known for Yugoslav Ivo Andrić's novel, The Bridge on the Drina.

=== Time of the Gypsies punk opera ===
During 2007, Kusturica and Nele Karajlić prepared a punk opera, Time of the Gypsies. The initial idea came five years earlier in 2002 from Kusturica's collaborator Marc di Domenico while the support of the Paris Opera director Gerard Mortier got the project rolling. Basing the production on his eponymous 1988 film, Kusturica wrote the libretto by adapting the story of the Gypsy youth from the Balkans relocating to Italy in order to obtain money for his ill sister's surgery. The director cast young Serbian folk singers Stevan Anđelković and Milica Todorović in the roles of Perhan and Azra, respectively, while the experienced Karajlić took the role of Ahmed Đida. The music in the original movie had been composed by Goran Bregović; however, since Kusturica and he have not been on speaking terms since the late 1990s, those pieces could not be used. The all-new score was composed by Dejan Sparavalo of the No Smoking Orchestra.

The premiere took place in June 2007, at the Opéra Bastille in Paris, to positive reviews. Following the vast open stage of Bastille, the show was performed in smaller arenas. In March 2008, the production was staged in Paris' Palais des congrès.

In fall 2010, the production was staged in Belgrade at Sava Center.

On 29 June 2012, the opera was staged in Banja Luka at the City Stadium, for the very first time under the open skies, with 10,000 people in attendance. This was followed with the July staging in Cartagena, Spain, as part of La Mar de Músicas de Cartagena.

Future staging of the punk opera is scheduled for August 2013 in Krasnodar, Russia, during Kubana Festival.

=== Küstendorf Film and Music Festival ===
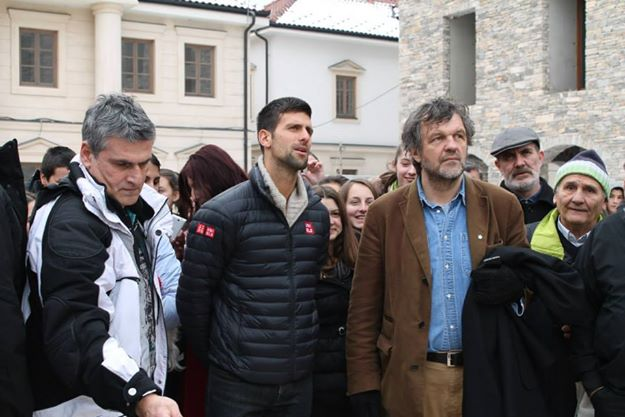
Kusturica with Novak Djokovic in Andrićgrad (2014)

Since 2008, Drvengrad hosts the annual Küstendorf Film and Music Festival, which showcases films and music from all around the world as well as a competition programme for student short films. The festival is known for not having a red carpet as well as none of the popular Hollywood festival artifacts.

=== Andrićgrad ===
On 28 June 2011 Kusturica started the construction project of Andrićgrad (also known as Kamengrad, meaning Stone Town), located in Višegrad, Republika Srpska, Bosnia and Herzegovina, which was scheduled to be completed by 2014. Andrićgrad is located several kilometers from Kusturica's first town Drvengrad, in Serbia. Andrićgrad will be used as a filming location for his new film "Na Drini ćuprija", based on the book The Bridge on the Drina, by Nobel Prize for Literature laureate Ivo Andrić. His last name is used in the town name Andrićgrad, meaning "Town of Andrić" in Serbian.

== Personal life ==
He also has French citizenship.

Kusturica is married to Maja Mandić; the couple has two children. They live in Drvengrad.

Film director Živojin Pavlović and writer Fyodor Dostoyevski are his main artistic influences.

=== Ethnic and religious identity ===
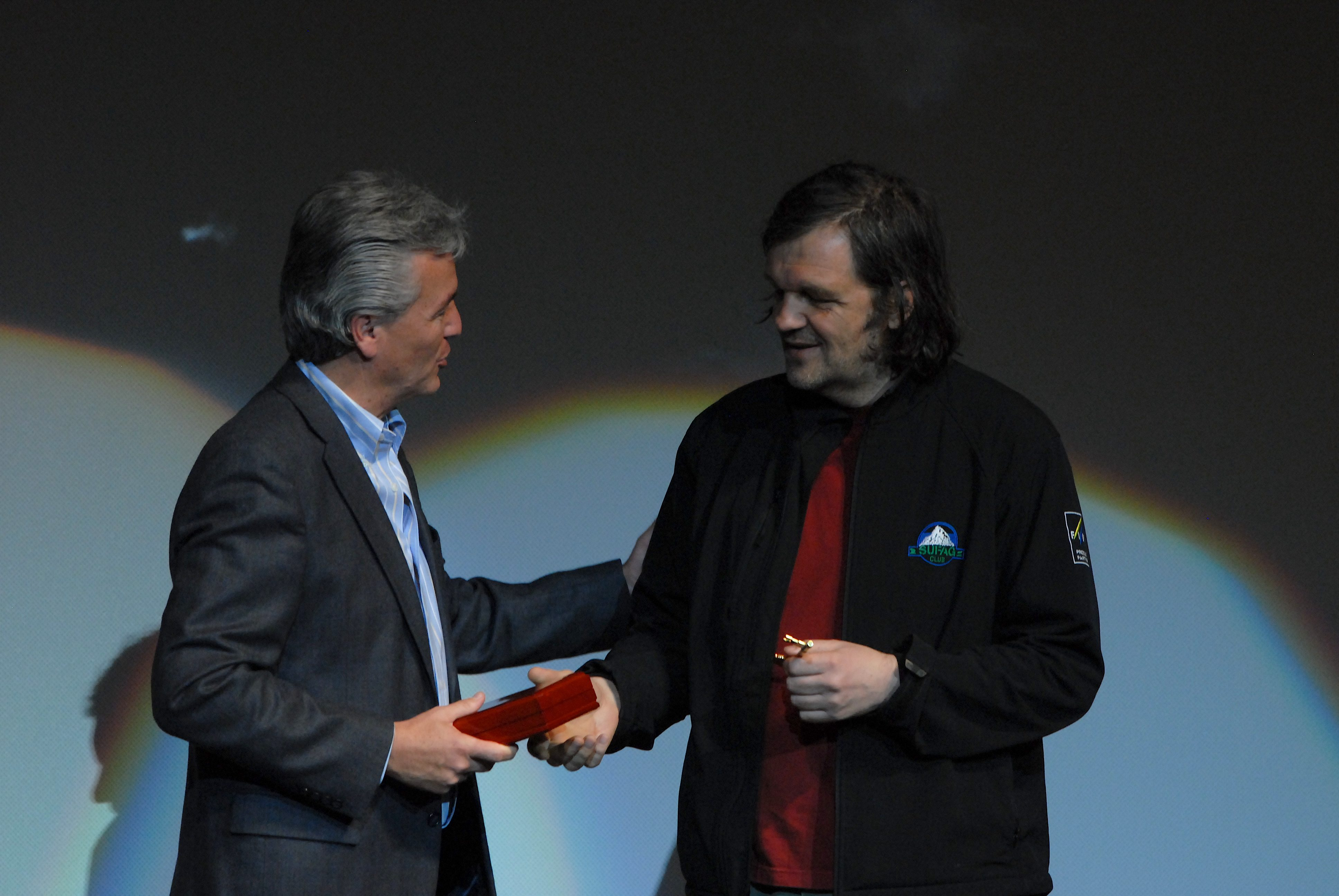
Mayor of Guadalajara, Alfonso Petersen, presents Kusturica with the keys to the city at Telmex Auditorium in March 2009

On Đurđevdan (St. George's Day) in 2005, he was baptised into the Serbian Orthodox Church as Nemanja Kusturica (Немања Кустурица) at the Savina monastery near Herceg Novi, Montenegro. To his critics who considered this the final betrayal of his Bosnian roots, he replied that:

My father was an atheist and he always described himself as a Serb. OK, maybe we were Muslim for 250 years, but we were Orthodox before that and deep down we were always Serbs, religion cannot change that.

Despite the aforementioned conflict of religion, Kusturica refused to see himself as either a Bosnian or Serb. Instead, he had continued to insist that he was simply a Yugoslav.

When his mother was on her deathbed, he wanted to find out his ancestry and learnt that the origin of the Kusturica family stemmed from two Orthodox Christian branches. An ancestor of his, who helped build the Arslanagić Bridge in the 18th century, hailed from Bileća and the Babić family. According to the studies of geographer Jevto Dedijer (1880–1918) in the Bileća region (1902): the Kusturica family lived in a čopor (grouped area, literally "pack") in the village of Plana; they had eight houses next to the Kozjak family (four houses), northwest across a field from the Avdić family (23 houses). In Granica, there was a family surnamed Kusturica which had left Plana 80 years earlier.

According to the Avdići, their progenitor Avdija Krivokapić, an Islamized Montenegrin, reportedly was honoured by the Sultan for his military service and on the way home to Herzegovina, in Kyustendil, he bought a gypsy and brought him to Plana; this gypsy was, according to them, an ancestor of the Kusturica family. The story, however, as was common, was motivated by traditional disputes of neighbouring families regarding status in the village. According to Savo Pujić, an ancestor was Hajdarbeg Kusturica who was a čauš (officer) who lived in Volujak and was said to have been fair, having repurchased Muslim slaves, protected Orthodox clergy and his subject peasants. The name is derived from kustur, an Old Slavic word for dull knives, sabres, etc., most often referring to sabres.

== Views and public positions ==
=== Serbian issues ===
Kusturica was an early supporter of Ante Marković's Union of Reform Forces of Yugoslavia. At the 2007 parliamentary elections, he gave indirect support to Prime Minister Vojislav Koštunica and his center-right Democratic Party of Serbia. In 2007, he also supported the nationalist Serbian campaign Solidarity - Kosovo is Serbia, a campaign against the independence of Kosovo.

As an outspoken environmentalist, Kusturica is a staunch opponent of the lithium mining in Serbia.

Because of this and his support of the anti-corruption students' protests, Kusturica is under constant attacks by the pro-government media in Serbia.

=== Roman Polanski ===
In 2009, Kusturica signed a petition in support of director Roman Polanski following his arrest in relation to his 1977 sexual abuse charges, who had been detained while traveling to a film festival, which the petition argued would undermine the tradition of film festivals as a place for works to be shown "freely and safely", and that arresting filmmakers traveling to neutral countries could open the door "for actions of which no-one can know the effects."

=== Putin and Russia ===
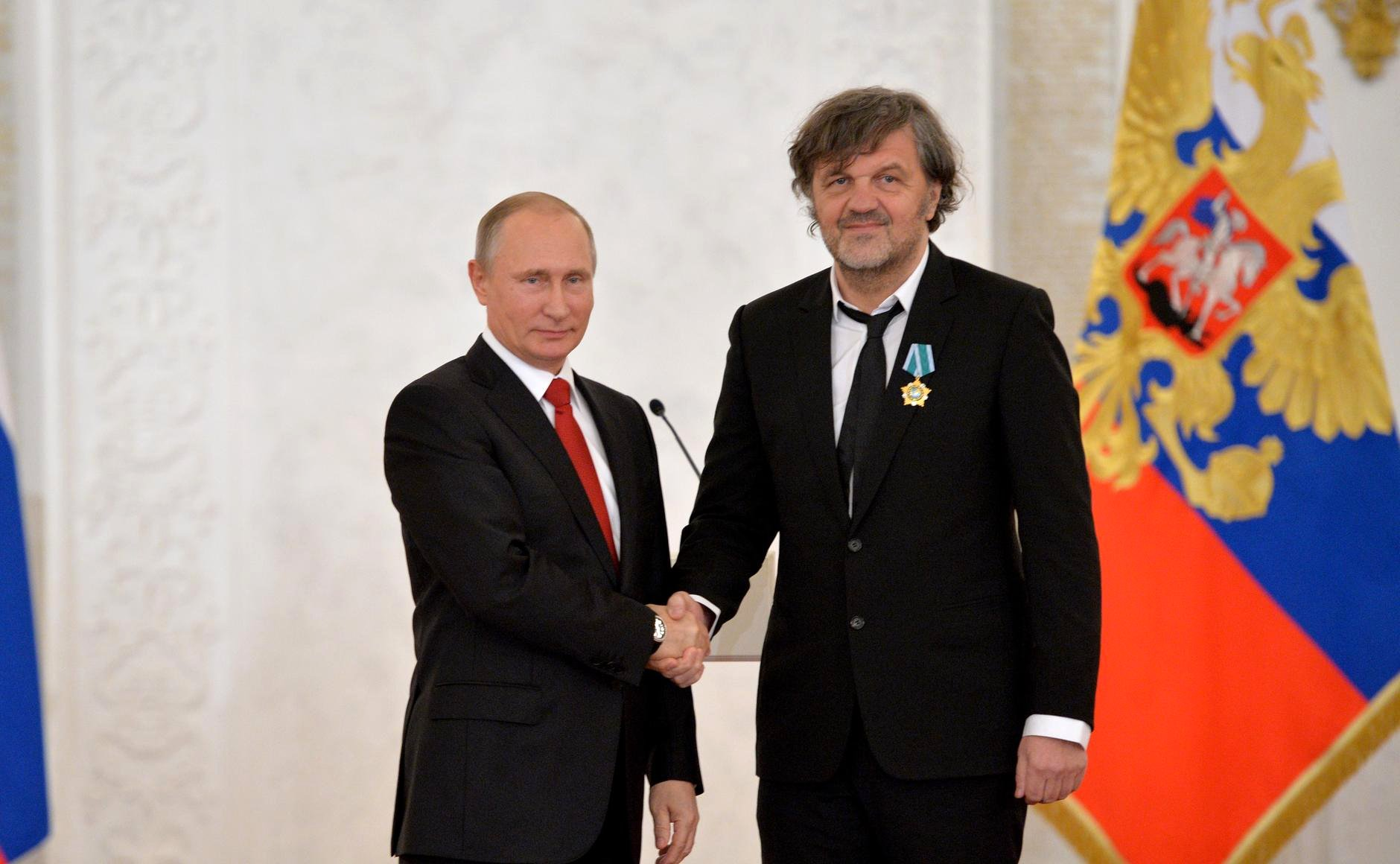
Russian President Vladimir Putin and Kusturica in the Kremlin on 4 November 2016

Regarding President of Russia, Vladimir Putin, he said in 2012: "If I was English I would be very much against Putin. If I was American I would even fight with him, but if I was Russian I would vote for him". Kusturica was present at the Kremlin for Putin's third inauguration as president in May 2012. He has expressed support for the 2014 Russian annexation of Crimea.

On 4 November 2016 he received the Order of Friendship from Vladimir Putin in Moscow. He communicated in Russian at the event.

In April 2022, Kusturica signed a petition calling for Serbia not to impose sanctions on Russia after it invaded Ukraine, with the petition reportedly arguing that alliance between the Russian and Serbian people is the only guarantee for maintaining Serbia's territorial integrity.

On 9 May 2025 he attended the 2025 Moscow Victory Day Parade where he voiced his support for Putin, calling him an "antiglobalist". Kusturica had attended the parade in 2020 as well.

== Filmography ==
=== Feature films ===
Year	Film	Director	Writer	Producer	Awards / notes
1981	Do You Remember Dolly Bell?	Yes	Yes	No	Four prizes at Venice Film Festival
1985	When Father Was Away on Business	Yes	No	No	Palme d'Or
1988	Time of the Gypsies	Yes	Yes	No	Best Director Award, Guldbagge Award for Best Foreign Film
1993	Arizona Dream	Yes	Yes	No	Silver Berlin Bear
1995	Underground	Yes	Yes	No	Palme d'Or
1998	Black Cat, White Cat	Yes	No	No	Silver Lion, Little Golden Lion at Venice Film Festival
2001	Super 8 Stories	Yes	Yes	Yes	Silver Plaque at CIFF
2004	Life Is a Miracle	Yes	Yes	Yes	César Award
2007	Promise Me This	Yes	Yes	Yes	Palme d'Or nominee
2008	Maradona by Kusturica	Yes	Yes	No	Screened at Cannes 2008
2014	Words with Gods	Yes	Yes	No	Co-author, anthology film
2016	On the Milky Road	Yes	Yes	No	Little Golden Lion Award at Venice Film Festival
2018	El Pepe: A Supreme Life	Yes	Yes	No	CICT-UNESCO Enrico Fulchignoni Award at Venice Film Festival

=== Shorts and television work ===
Year	Title	Director	Writer	Producer	Notes
1978	Guernica	Yes	No	No	Short film
1978	The Brides Are Coming	Yes	No	No	TV film
1979	Buffet Titanic	Yes	Yes	No	TV film
1984	Nije čovjek ko ne umre	Yes	No	No	TV film
1996	Bila jednom jedna zemlja	Yes	Yes	No	TV mini-series
1997	Magic Bus	Yes	No	No	Short film
2018	On the Milky Road	Yes	Yes	No	TV series
2020	Junaci našeg vremena	Yes	Yes	Yes	Short film

=== As actor (selected films) ===
Year	Title	Role	Notes
1972	Walter Defends Sarajevo	Omladinac	
1993	Arizona Dream	Man in Bar	Uncredited
1995	Underground	Arms dealer	
2000	The Widow of Saint-Pierre	Ariel Neel Auguste	
2002	The Good Thief	Vladimir	
2004	Strawberries in the Supermarket	General	
2006	Secret Journey	Harold	
2007	Hermano	Chomsky	
2009	L'affaire Farewell	Grigoriev	
2011	Nicostratos the Pelican	Démosthène	
2012	7 Days in Havana		Segment "Jam Session"
2013	Au bonheur des ogres	Stojil	
2014	Words with Gods	Monk	
2016	On the Milky Road	Kosta	
2019	The Balkan Line	Taksista	
2022	Srpska: The Struggle for Freedom	Self	

== Awards ==
=== Selected film awards ===
- 1st prize on Student's Film Festival in Karlovy Vary, (1978) for Guernica
- Golden Lion for "Best First Work" in Venice Film Festival, (1981) for Do You Remember Dolly Bell?
- FIPRESCI prize at Venice Film Festival (1981) for Do You Remember Dolly Bell?
- Golden Palm Cannes Film Festival, (1985) for When Father Was Away on Business
- FIPRESCI prize Cannes Film Festival, (1985) for When Father Was Away on Business
- Best Foreign Language Academy Award Nomination, (1985) for When Father Was Away on Business
- Best Director award at Cannes Film Festival, (1989) for Time of Gypsies
- Silver Bear – Special Jury Prize at the Berlin Film Festival, (1993) for Arizona Dream
- Golden Palm at Cannes Film Festival, (1995) for Underground
- Silver Lion for best director in 1998 Venice Film Festival for the film Black Cat, White Cat.
- Silver Plate of best documentary at Chicago International Film Festival, (2001) for Super 8 Stories
- Cinema Prize of the French Education System at Cannes Festival (2004) for Life is a Miracle
- Best European Union Film at César Awards, (2005) for Life is a Miracle
- In 2004, The Prix de l'Education nationale (National Education Prize) honored Emir Kusturica and his film Život je čudo (Life is a Miracle).
- Lifetime Achievement Award at the 26th Moscow International Film Festival
- Honorary Magritte Award at the 4th Magritte Awards, on 1 February 2014.
- CICT-UNESCO Enrico Fulchignoni Award, Venice film festival, 2018.

=== Architecture ===
- Philippe Rotthier European Architecture Award for his ethnic village project Küstendorf (also called Drvengrad – "wooden town") on Mt. Zlatibor, Serbia, in 2005. The prize is awarded every three years by the Brussels Foundation for Architecture.

=== Literature ===
- "Momo Kapor award", for his book Death is an Unverified Rumour, 2011
- "Tipar award" for satire, awarded in the city of Pljevlja, 2011
- 'Dejan Medaković' Award, 2022
- 'Radovan Beli Marković' Award, 2023
- 'Borisav Stanković' Award, 2024

=== Orders ===
- Ordre des Arts et des Lettres, France's highest order in recognition of significant contribution to the arts.
- Order of St. Sava, Serbian Orthodox Church's highest decoration, on 12 May 2012
- Order of St. King Milutin, awarded in Andrićgrad by Serbian Orthodox Church, on 28 June 2014
- Order of the Holy Despot Stefan Lazarevic, 2016
- Order of Friendship, 2016
- Order of the Star of Italy, 2017
- Golden medal Sergei Bondarchuk, 2017
- Order of the Flag of Republika Srpska, 2018.
- Medal of Merit of the Czech Republic, 28 October 2019
- Sretenje Order, 2021
- Medal ‘Great Russian writer F.M. Dostoevsky 1821-2021’ awarded by the Ministry of Culture of the Russian Federation, 2023
- Order of St. Most Reverend Seraphim of Sarov, Russian Orthodox Church, 2024

== See also ==
- List of UNICEF Goodwill Ambassadors

== Bibliography ==
=== Books ===
- Gocić, Goran (2001). The Cinema of Emir Kusturica: Notes from the Underground. London: Wallflower Press. ISBN 978-1-903364-14-7.
- Iordanova, Dina: Emir Kusturica. London. British Film Institute 2002.
- Imsirevic, Almir: "Based on a Truth Story", Sarajevo, 2007.
