= Složna braća =

Serbian television series

- Genre: Comedy; War
- Created by: Nele Karajlić
- Written by: Nele Karajlić
- Directed by: Oleg Novković; Nikola Pejaković; Nele Karajlić
- Starring: Vladimir Savčić; Davor Dujmović; Živojin Milenković; Zoran Cvijanović; Nele Karajlić; Petar Božović; Nataša Ninković
- Opening theme: Vladimir Savčić
- Composers: Darko Ostojić; Dejan Sparavalo
- Country of origin: FR Yugoslavia
- Original language: Serbian
- No. of seasons: 1
- No. of episodes: 7

Production
- Producer: Slobodan Đorđević
- Cinematography: Bojan Rakić
- Editor: Marko Glušac
- Running time: 45–55 minutes

Original release
- Network: RTS
- Release: January 5 – February 16, 1996

Složna braća (transl. Cordial Brothers) is a 1995 Serbian television comedy miniseries. Created and written by Nele Karajlić and directed by Oleg Novković, Karajlić, and Nikola Pejaković the series achieved sizable popularity.

The series inspired a sequel titled Složna braća — Next Đeneration, which began airing in 2022.

== Overview ==
Taking place just after the end of the Bosnian War, the series is mostly set in the Halimić brothers owned kafana named Složna braća, located on a small patch of UN-controlled territory (covering 0.0675% of the country's territory, i.e. 564 m^{2}) not claimed by any of the three warring sides. Serbs, Bosniaks, and Croats, otherwise very hostile to each other following a ferocious war, regularly visit the said kafana in no man's land in order to arrange mutual black market activities (weapons and food trade, oil and cigarette smuggling, etc.).

When the word gets around about an important weapons shipment passing through the territory that can supposedly completely change the division of power in the Balkans, the place becomes a lively hub of deal-making and skulduggery.

== Cast ==
=== Main ===
- Vladimir "Čobi" Savčić as Fikret "Fiko" Halimić
- Davor Dujmović as Mustafa "Mute" Halimić
- Goran Sultanović as Adnan "Čenga" Čengić
- Živojin Milenković as Vojo Kecman
- Zoran Cvijanović as Zoran "Kiza" Valuta
- Nele Karajlić as Miljenko Ćutuk
- Petar Božović as Manjina Liska
- Nataša Ninković as Srebrenka
- Nikola Pejaković as Čorba
- Seka Sablić as Milena
- Darko Ostojić as Mehmed "Memara" Halimić and Nana
- Mirsad Tuka as Sabe

== Production ==
The series was shot from June until September 1995, mostly in RTS' Košutnjak studios in Filmski Grad, Belgrade.

== Reception ==
The series premiered on Friday, 5 January 1996 in prime time on RTS, achieving high viewership rates in FR Yugoslavia.
