= The No Smoking Orchestra =

Yugoslavian musical group

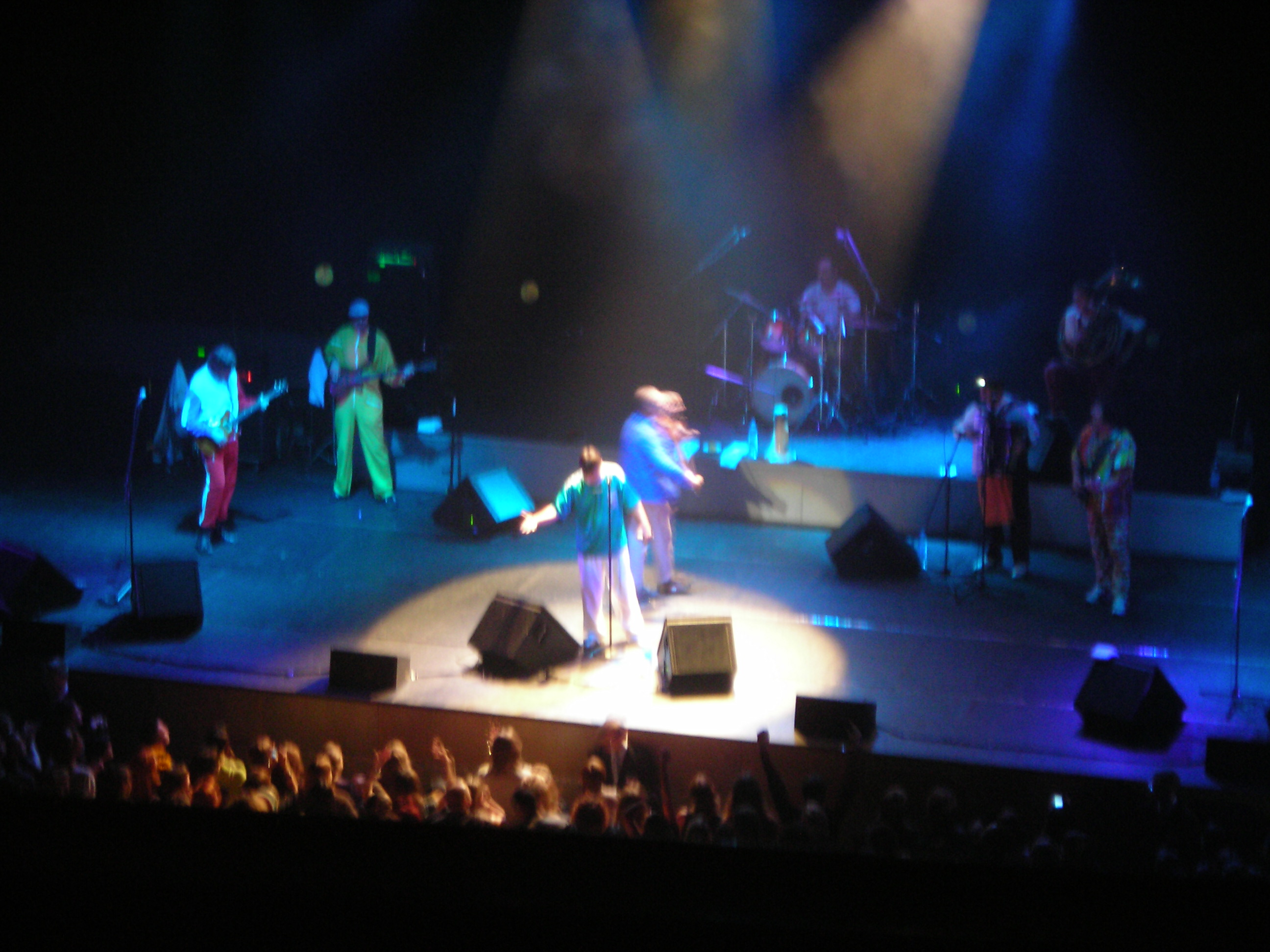
- The No Smoking Orchestra playing at BKZ Oktyabrskiy in St. Petersburg, Russia on 6 October 2007

Background information
- Also known as: Emir Kusturica and the No Smoking Orchestra
- Origin: Belgrade, FR Yugoslavia
- Genres: Garage rock; world music; gypsy punk
- Years active: 1993–present
- Labels: Komuna; Barclay; Mercury; Warner Music France; Decca; UMG
- Spinoff of: Zabranjeno Pušenje
- Members: See below
- Website: Official website

The No Smoking Orchestra, frequently credited as Emir Kusturica and the No Smoking Orchestra, was a Serbian garage rock band formed in Belgrade in 1993.

The band was formed in 1993 by Nele Karajlić who, after relocating to Belgrade from Sarajevo, decided to revive Zabranjeno Pušenje, a band he co-founded with Sejo Sexon in 1980 that had at that point been dormant since 1990. Initially, the band performed as Zabranjeno Pušenje, but ultimately changed the name to Emir Kusturica & The No Smoking Orchestra when renowned filmmaker Emir Kusturica (who had previously played with the band in 1987) re-joined it in 1998.

== History ==
During the Bosnian War, Nele Karajlić moved to Belgrade. Throughout the 1993 through 1996 period, he played with different musicians under the name Zabranjeno pušenje. Their album Ja nisam odavle was released through Komuna in 1997.

In 1998 the band composed the music for Emir Kusturica's film Black Cat, White Cat, which won the Silver Lion at the Venice Film Festival the same year. Since June 1999, the band has been regularly touring worldwide. They developed quite a following internationally in the process. Their popularity is particularly notable in Southern Europe (Italy, Portugal, Spain, and France) where most of their initial touring took place in late 1990s and early 2000s and in Latin America where the band first played in 2001, gradually developing a spirited fan base throughout the continent, especially in Argentina. Lately, the band has also fond much success deep into Eastern Europe (Russia, Ukraine, Belarus, and Armenia).

In 2005, a DVD live album Live is a Miracle of the band's performance in Buenos Aires' Luna Park was released. In 2007, the band was involved in Time of the Gypsies punk opera that was staged in Bastille in Paris.

Since the Ušće fiasco, the band played only a few more concerts on home soil such as 2008 large open-air gigs in Kruševac and Novi Sad that went well, serving as lead ins for the concert at Belgrade Arena in late November 2008 where more than 10,000 gathered.

Though the band played Montreal twice before, summer 2010 marked their first foray into North America with concerts in Toronto, Montreal, Quebec City, Chicago, and New York City. The highlight of the mini-tour was the outdoor concert in the streets of Montreal in front of some 60,000 spectators as part of the city's jazz festival (Le Festival International de Jazz de Montréal).

== Controversy ==
The Belgrade-based band's live repertoire includes a homage to convicted war criminal Radovan Karadžić (a.k.a. Dr. Dragan David Dabić), who was arrested in July 2008 in Belgrade, on the song "Wanted Man." In January 2009, Tilman Zülch, founder and President of the Society for Threatened Peoples, wrote an open letter to the organizers of a Munich concert protesting the band's performance on January 24, 2009. He called organizers to "Stop the propaganda for war criminal Karadžic on the Munich concert stage!"

== Members ==
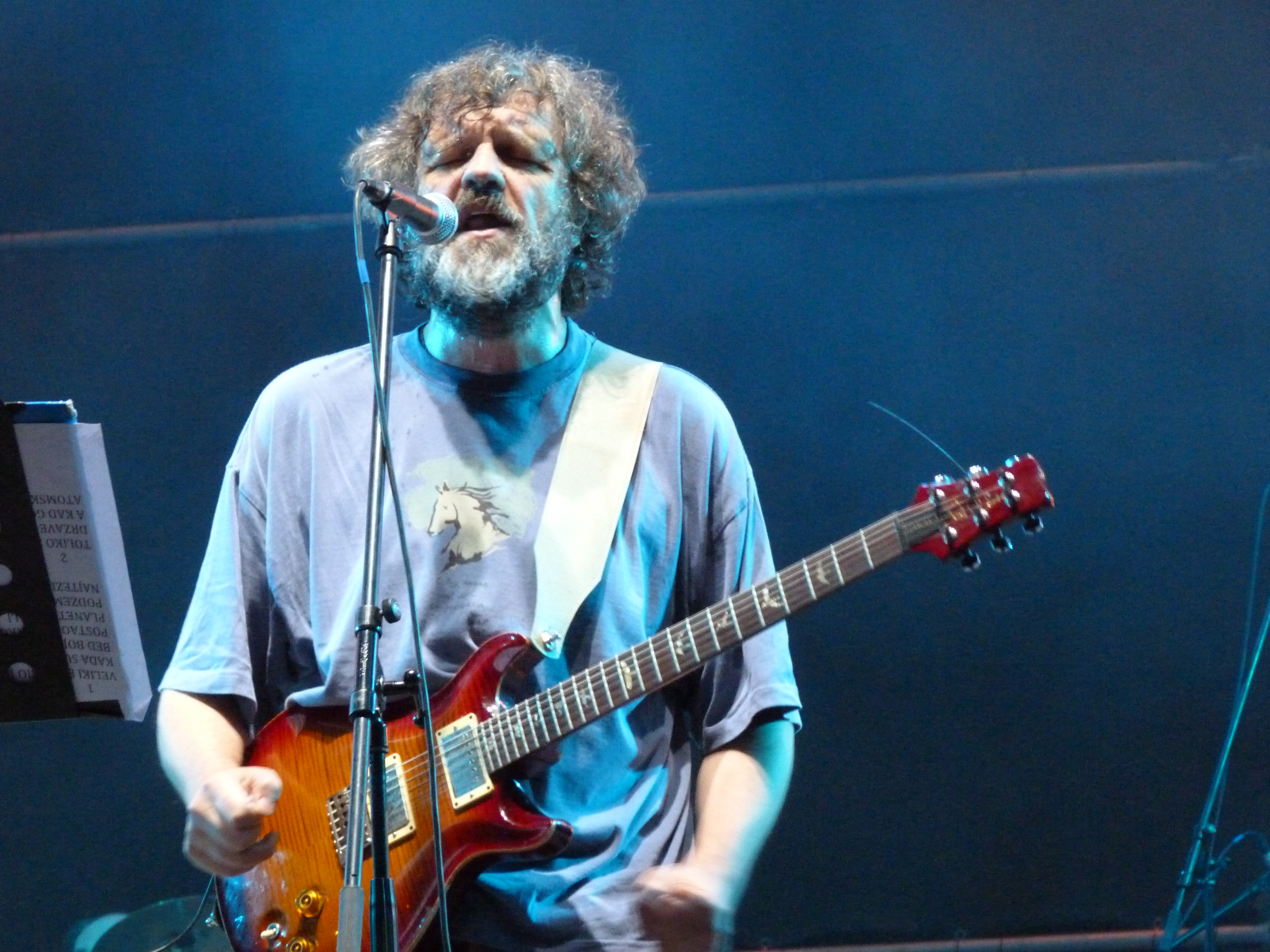
Emir Kusturica performing live with The No Smoking Orchestra at Budapest Park in 2014

=== Current ===
- Emir Kusturica – rhythm guitar, lead guitar, backing vocals (1998–present)
- Dejan Sparavalo – violin, backing vocals (1996–present)
- Stribor Kusturica – drums, percussion, backing vocals (1996–present)
- Zoran Milošević (Zoki) – accordion (1998–present)
- Nenad Petrović (Neša) – saxophone (1999–present)
- Zoran Marjanović (Čeda) – percussion, drums (2001–present)
- Goran Popović (Pop) – tuba, trumpet, bass guitar (2001–present)

=== Former ===
- Nenad Janković (Dr. Nele Karajlić) – vocals, backing vocals, keyboards (1993–2012)
- Dražen Janković (Herr Dralle Draugentaller) – keyboards, organ, backing vocals (1996–2018; his death)
- Goran Markovski (Glava Markovsky) – bass guitar, bass balalaika (1996–2005)
- Goran Jakovljević (Terry) – guitar (1996–1998)
- Aleksandar Balaban – tuba, trumpet (1998–2001)
- Nenad Gajin (Coce) – lead guitar, rhythm guitar, acoustic guitar (1999–2004)
- Ivan Maksimović – lead guitar, rhythm guitar, acoustic guitar, bouzouki (2004–2019; his death)

Note

- Many other musicians have appeared on various albums in large and varying setups.

== Discography ==
Source: thenosmokingorchestra.com

=== Studio albums ===
- Ja nisam odavle (1997) (as Nele Karajlić & Zabranjeno pušenje)
- Black Cat, White Cat (1998)
- Unza Unza Time (2000)
- Life Is a Miracle (2004)
- Time of the Gypsies (2007)
- Corps Diplomatique (2018)

=== Live albums ===
- Live Is a Miracle in Buenos Aires (2005)

=== Compilation albums ===
- The Best of Emir Kusturica and the No Smoking Orchestra (2009)
