= Nele Karajlić =

Bosnian singer and actor (born 1962)

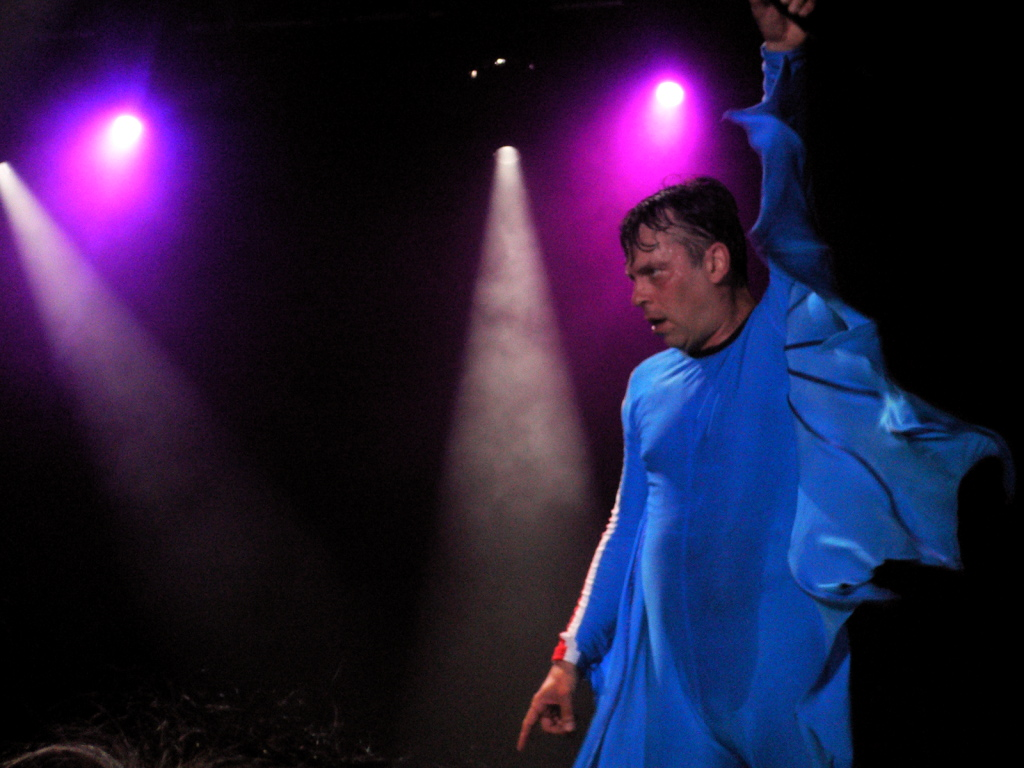
- Karajlić performing with The No Smoking Orchestra in 2009

Background information
- Born: Nenad Janković; 11 December 1962 (age 63); Sarajevo, SR Bosnia and Herzegovina, SFR Yugoslavia
- Genres: Rock, World music, Garage Rock, Rock and roll
- Occupations: Singer, actor, writer
- Years active: 1984–present
- Labels: Jugoton; Diskoton; Komuna; Universal

Nenad Janković (Serbian Cyrillic: Ненад Јанковић; pronounced [nênaːd jǎŋkoʋit͡ɕ]; born 11 December 1962), known as Dr Nele Karajlić (Serbian Cyrillic: Др Неле Карајлић), is a Bosnian musician, composer, comedian, actor, writer and television director living and working in Belgrade, Serbia. One of the founders of the New Primitivism cultural movement in his hometown of Sarajevo, he was also the lead singer and co-author for one of former Yugoslavia's best known bands, Zabranjeno Pušenje (No Smoking).

Karajlić also co-created and participated in TV shows Top lista nadrealista (The Surrealist Hit Parade) and Složna braća. During the Bosnian War, he moved to Belgrade where he formed one of two descendant factions of Zabranjeno Pušenje. That splinter of the band was joined by filmmaker Emir Kusturica, and renamed it The No Smoking Orchestra.

== Early life ==
Janković was born on 11 December 1962, in Sarajevo, SFR Yugoslavia, present day Bosnia and Herzegovina into a middle-class family. His father Srđan Janković was a linguist and professor of Oriental sciences at the University of Sarajevo's Faculty of Philosophy. In his youth, Nenad was a mischievous kid with short attention span.

Following in his father's footsteps, Janković also studied Orientalism at the same school where his father taught. However, as his music and TV career took off, the studies were no longer a priority and he never finished them.

He initially took a nom de guerre "Dr Nele Karajlić" as an inside joke. The name was supposed to recall the wartime practice of Partisan conspirators from World War II, who were lionized in state-sponsored movies and television series. The surname Karajlić vaguely recalls Bosnian Muslim ancestry, obfuscating his Serbian ancestry, despite the fact that it was entirely fabricated. Other Zabranjeno Pušenje members and friends were similarly and misleadingly nicknamed. "It later proved to be useful," he once said, "since no one outside our group could really tell which nationality we were when the pre-war ethnic tensions started".

== Music career ==
=== Nele and Sejo – the original Zabranjeno Pušenje ===
As Zabranjeno Pušenje's music and shtick started to catch on all over Yugoslavia during mid-'80s, Nele became one of the better-known public figures in the entire country. His deliberately low-brow and unkempt style were paired with a similar philosophical streak of New Primitivism that the band claimed to follow and propagate.

Their debut album Das ist Walter appeared in June 1984. A national tour followed, which brought Nele more attention. They played a sold-out show (6,000 capacity) at Hala sportova in Belgrade on 4 November 1984. At this time Nele was also starring on the Top lista nadrealista sketch comedy TV show, soon making him a celebrity.

Over the next seven years Zabranjeno Pušenje recorded three more studio albums and played countless sold-out arenas. However, Nele and Davor Sučić (aka "Sejo Sexon"), the band's leading duo, were getting on increasingly colder terms. The Yugoslavia-wide tour with Bombaj Štampa and Top lista nadrealista during early 1990, though hugely commercially successful, only exacerbated their fractured business and personal relationship. The band broke up in late summer 1990 when Sejo Sexon informed Karajlić about no longer being interested in playing with him. Others left the band due to different views on the band vision more than the political differences in Yugoslav leadership in the late 1980s. Nele fled for Belgrade in the spring of 1992, soon after fighting flared up in Bosnia and Herzegovina.

=== Dr Karajlić goes to Belgrade ===
In Belgrade, Nele was a refugee – albeit a famous one. Together with his wife Sanja and their infant daughter he spent his first Belgrade days in the apartment belonging to Rambo Amadeus. For the most part, music was the furthest thing on his mind during this period. He could be seen across town waiting in lines in front of different charity organizations like ADRA to send food packages to family members in Sarajevo which was under siege by Serbian forces.

His first post-original-Zabranjeno Pušenje music gig was a low-publicity duet with Toni Montano on a quickly forgotten track called "Srećna porodica". Throughout the 1993 through 1996 period, Nele played with different musicians on a recreational basis under the name Zabranjeno Pušenje. He did not record any new material and would occasionally play an odd club date or two in Belgrade. In September 1995 he traveled to Toronto where he met up with Mladen Pavičić 'Pava', formerly of Plavi Orkestar, and some local musicians, including drummer Boris Daich and bassist Nenad Stanojevic, for a Zabranjeno Pušenje show.

On 13 September 1996, the band performed a concert at Belgrade's Tašmajdan which turned out to be a success. On the strength of their Belgrade success the new band embarked on a mini-tour across FR Yugoslavia, Macedonia, Bosnia and Herzegovina and Slovenia during which they played some memorable arena gigs in Novi Sad, Skopje, Banja Luka and Ljubljana.

This sudden unexpected surge of public interest made Nele feel added responsibility for the quality of the material about to be released, so he postponed the already set album release date because he felt songs were still not tight enough. Finally in 1997, the Belgrade fraction of Zabranjeno Pušenje (of which Nele was the only original member) released Ja nisam odavle (I'm not from around 'ere) which did well.

In 1998, members of the Belgrade Zabranjeno Pušenje joined forces with Riblja Čorba's Bora Đorđević under the name Riblje Pušenje (Fish Smoking) to record two Yugoslavia fan songs for the upcoming football World Cup in France. Two tracks entitled "Pobednička Pesma" (Winners' Song) and "Gubitnička Pesma" (Losers' Song) featured Nele and Bora singing praises and insults respectively to the SR Yugoslavia national team. The idea was to have a song ready for each case – victory and defeat.

Around this time Nele collaborated with film director and former Zabranjeno Pušenje bass player, Emir Kusturica, on the soundtrack for the Black Cat, White Cat movie. Off that record, the track "Pit bull" became a moderate hit as well as "Bubamara" – a gypsy brass version of "Ženi nam se Vukota" (Vukota's Getting Married) from Ja nisam odavle.

=== The No Smoking Orchestra ===
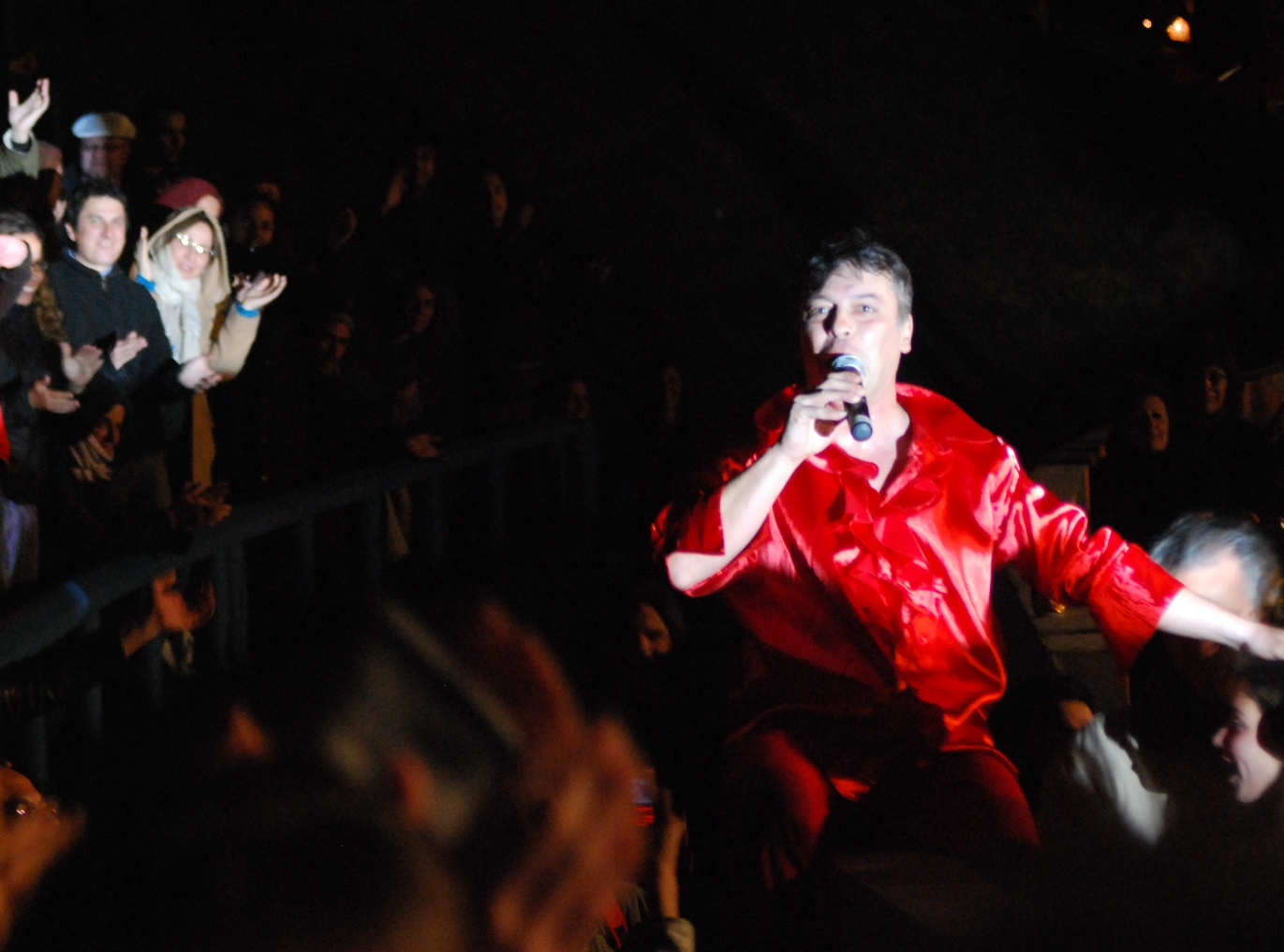
Karajlić and the The No Smoking Orchestra performing at the Teatro de Verano in Montevideo, 17 October 2008

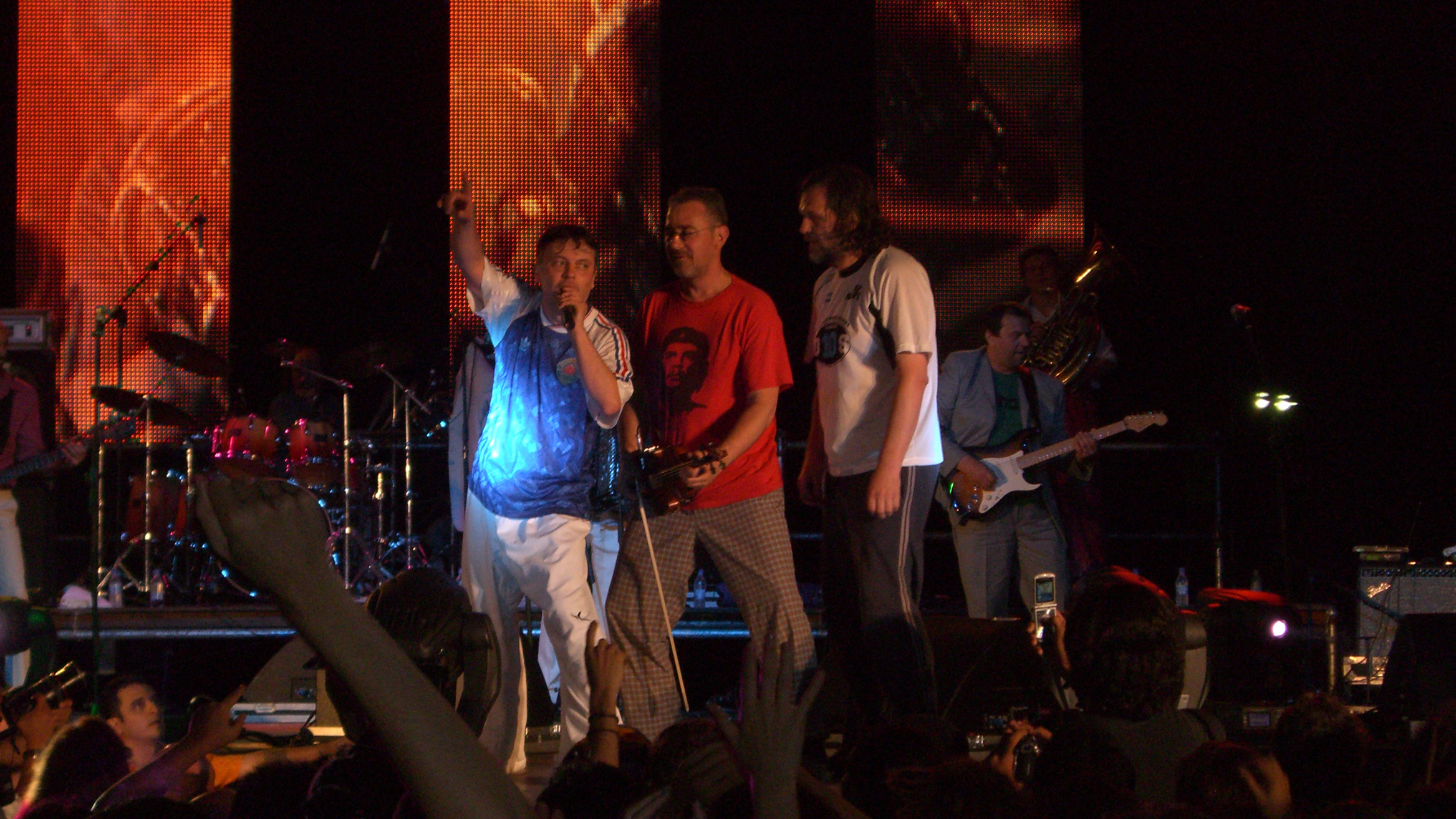
Karajlić, Dejan Sparavalo and Emir Kusturica in Caracas, April 2008

After Black Cat, White Cat finished its theatrical life, Nele and the band were approached by Emir Kusturica for an Italian tour in the summer of 1999, right after the NATO bombing of FR Yugoslavia. The band was renamed to Emir Kusturica & The No Smoking Orchestra even if the famous director had a fairly minor musical role in it. The tour named Effeti Collaterali was a big success and they soon released a Europe-wide album for Universal named Unza Unza Time.

This was the third incarnation of Zabranjeno pusenje (second after Nele's split from the original band). They did away with traditional rock'n'roll sound but kept the attitude. Booming guitar took a back seat to accordion and violin, while Nele's scratchy howl assumed a more sedated tone. In the 2001 documentary Super 8 Stories legendary Joe Strummer, clearly at a loss for words, describes their sound as "this crazy Greek-Jewish wedding music of the past,... and the future".

That movie, directed by Kusturica details goings-on throughout their first two tours. A second one that started in the spring of 2000 saw them pay visits to cities in France, Spain, Portugal, Germany and of course Italy, which had by this time become their business base.

The band's touring agenda was set around Kusturica's movie schedule (he was shooting Life Is a Miracle at the time), which is why they waited until 2004 for the next tour that in addition to their usual stomping grounds also took them to places as Argentina, Brazil, Chile, Venezuela and Israel.

Even if he does not have the highest billing anymore, Nele is still the band's de facto frontman. Kusturica's role is that of a Trojan horse – his starpower draws people to shows, he then does his talking bit at the beginning and in-between some songs (often purposely delivered in broken English) and finally turns the audience over to Nele & Co. Being aware of his limited playing capabilities, Kusturica takes a backseat role as the rhythm guitar player.

It is a setup that suits Nele. He and the band would probably never have the opportunity to achieve an international music career on their own and that is why Nele often likens Kusturica's approach and the subsequent band's transformation to "someone opening a window in a stuffy room".

Ironically, this makeover robbed them of huge popularity at home in Serbia. This was most evident on 3 July 2004 when they played their first and so far only domestic show in Belgrade. Conceptually it was to be a celebration of the band's 20th anniversary (if continuity is assumed through all of the band's incarnations) for which they joined forces with another local favourite Riblja Čorba, who were celebrating their 25th.

The concert drew 40,000 but it quickly turned unpleasant after No Smoking Orchestra took the stage. The crowd coldly tolerated their new shtick (songs in Spanish, German, Romany and English, Nele's new ethno getup, etc.) throughout the first few songs but soon began to show hostility when it became clear the old classics would not be played. Instead of Zabranjeno Pušenje, the crowd got The No Smoking Orchestra, and they did not like it. The stage was pelted with half-filled plastic water bottles forcing the band to abandon their set after barely 40 minutes. It was an unpleasant homecoming and a clear statement that their new style is not welcomed by hardcore fans.

The band did not dwell on it and they continued the tour, crossing Europe, South America and even parts of Asia. In May 2005 they played a show in Cannes, France, during the film festival for a movie industry crowd including Salma Hayek and Javier Bardem.

== Writing ==
In June 2014, Karajlić's autobiography Fajront u Sarajevu (Last Call in Sarajevo) got released. In addition to glowing reviews and notices, it also did well commercially, selling more than 80,000 copies by the end of 2014. He also wrote FBI-Tesla files, United brothers and 28 Thessaloniki Street.
