= Éric Boisset =

French writer

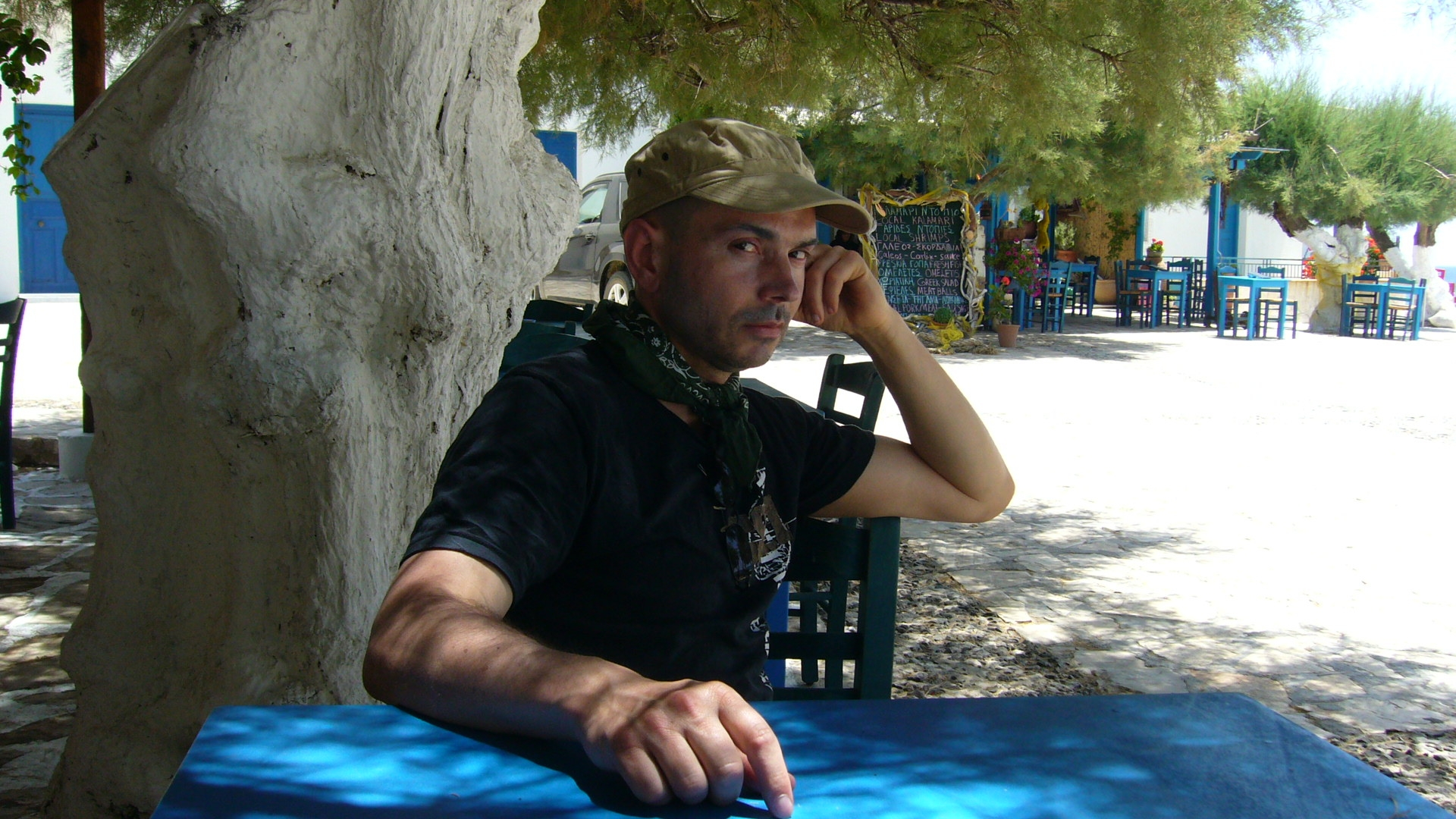
Éric Boisset

Éric Boisset (born 8 November 1965 in Valence, Drôme) is a French writer.

== Works ==
- La Trilogie d'Arkandias
  - Le Grimoire d'Arkandias, Magnard, ISBN 2-210-98460-2. Grand Prix des Jeunes Lecteurs PEEP 1997. Prix des Incorruptibles 1998. Prix des Dévoreurs de Livres 1999.
  - Arkandias contre-attaque, Magnard, ISBN 2-210-98462-9
  - Le Sarcophage d'outretemps, Magnard, ISBN 2-210-98463-7
- La Trilogie des Charmettes
  - Le Secret de tante Eudoxie, Magnard, 2002, ISBN 2-210-98464-5
  - L'Œil du mainate, Magnard, 2004, ISBN 2-210-98485-8
  - L'Antichambre de Mana, Magnard, 2005, ISBN 2-210-98486-6
- Nicostratos, Magnard, ISBN 2-210-98474-2. Prix des Dévoreurs de Livres 1998. Prix Jeunesse du Festival international de géographie of Saint-Dié-des-Vosges, 1998.
- Les Guetteurs d'Azulis, Magnard, ISBN 2-210-96922-0
- L'Œuf du démon, Plon Jeunesse ISBN 978-2-259-20870-3. Prix des Dévoreurs de Livres 2009. Prix Littérature Jeunesse de l'Institut français de Rabat Salé Kénitra (Maroc) 2012.
- La Botte secrète, Éditions Thierry Magnier, ISBN 978-2844207166
- L'Étincelle d'or, Magnard ISBN 978-2-210-96936-0.
- Les Pierres de fumée - volume 1 : La Prédiction, Magnard, ISBN 978-2210961005
- Les Pierres de fumée - volume 2 : La Révélation, Magnard, ISBN 978-2210961296
- Les Pierres de fumée - volume 3 : La Rédemption, Magnard, ISBN 978-2210962644
