= Darko Jelčić =

Bosnian musician (born 1965)

- Born: 1 January 1965 (age 61); Zenica, SR Bosnia and Herzegovina, SFR Yugoslavia
- Genres: Pop rock; power pop; pop; folk rock
- Occupation: Musician
- Instruments: Drums, percussion
- Years active: 1985–present
- Labels: Jugoton, Croatia Records
- Formerly of: Crvena Jabuka

Darko "Cunja" Jelčić (born 1 January 1965) is a Bosnian and Yugoslav musician best known for having been the drummer for the popular pop rock band Crvena Jabuka from 1985 to 2017.

== Biography ==
=== Early life ===
Jelčić was born in Zenica on New Year's Day, 1965. He started playing drums as a teenager.

=== Crvena Jabuka (1985-2017) ===
In 1985, Jelčić became a member of the band Crvena Jabuka. The band's original lineup consisted of Dražen Ričl "Para" (vocals, guitar), Zlatko "Zlaja" Arslanagić (guitar), Dražen Žerić "Žera" (keyboards), Aljoša Buha (bass guitar) and Jelčić (drums). The band's 1986 self-titled debut album saw large commercial success and media attention, the band announcing a nationwide promotional tour. On 18 September 1986, while on their way to hold a concert in Mostar, band members were involved in a car accident near Jablaničko lake, in which Buha died on impact, while Ričl died in October 1986 from his injuries. Žerić, Arslanagić and Jelčić continued as Crvena Jabuka, releasing the band's second album Za sve ove godine in 1987, Žerić taking over the vocal duties. From 1987 to 1991, Crvena Jabuka would be one of the most successful bands on the Yugoslav rock scene.

In 1992, as the Bosnian War broke out, the band ended their activity. In 1994, Žerić and Jelčić emigrated to Zagreb, where they reformed Crvena Jabuka with Nikša Bratoš. With principal songwriter Arslanagić out of the band, the group started to coopeerate with external songwriters, renewing their popularity in former Yugoslav republics. Jelčić took part in the recording of the band's comeback album and following five studio albums. He did not take part in the recording of the studio albums Volim te (I Love You, 2009) and Za tvoju ljubav (For Your Love, 2011), Nek' bude ljubav (Let There Be Love, 2013) and 2016 (2016), on which the drums were played by studio musicians. However, he did remain the official member of the band, continuing to perform with the band live.

=== Departure from Crvena Jabuka, formation of Cunja Crvena Jabuka (2017–present) ===
In July 2017, Jelčić left Crvena Jabuka, leaving Žerić as the sole remaining original member of the band, stating that Žerić ousted him from the group. He would later state that he left the band out of financial disagreements with Žerić and that he was dissatisfied with Žerić's decision to turn to more folk-oriented sound. Žerić himself declined to comment Jelčić's statements.

During spring 2018, Jelčić moved to Hamilton, Ontario, Canada with his family.

In 2023, Jelčić formed his new band Cunja Crvena Jabuka, based in Toronto, Canada and performing only Crvena Jabuka songs from the 1985–1991 period.

== Discography ==
=== With Crvena Jabuka ===
==== Studio albums ====
- Crvena Jabuka (1986)
- Za sve ove godine (1987)
- Sanjati (1988)
- Tamo gdje ljubav počinje (1989)
- Nekako s proljeća (1991)
- U tvojim očima (1996)
- Svijet je lopta šarena (1997)
- Sve što sanjam (2000)
- Tvojim željama vođen (2002)
- Oprosti što je ljubavna (2005)
- ...Duša Sarajeva (2007)

==== Live albums ====
- Uzmi me (kad hoćeš ti) (1990)
- Riznice sjećanja (1999)
- Live (2001)
- Bivše djevojčice, bivši dječaci – Unplugged live u Lisinskom (2014)
