= Kongres =

Former Yugoslav band

- Kongres in 1984, from left to right: Adam Subašić, Mahir Purivatra, Aljoša Buha

Background information
- Origin: Sarajevo, SR Bosnia and Herzegovina, SFR Yugoslavia
- Genres: New wave; art pop
- Years active: 1982–1985
- Labels: Diskoton
- Past members: Mahir Purivatra; Emir Cerić; Jadranko Džihan; Aljoša Buha; Adam Subašić; Igor Ivanović; Edo Gradinčić

Kongres (transl. Congress) was a Yugoslav rock band formed in Sarajevo in 1982. The group was a prominent act of the 1980s Yugoslav rock scene.

== History ==
=== 1982–1985 ===
Kongres was formed in Sarajevo in the spring of 1982 by guitarist and vocalist Mahir Purivatra, vocalist Emir Cerić, keyboardist Jadranko "Dado" Džihan, bass guitarist Aljoša Buha and drummer Adam Subašić. They were inspired to name the band Kongres by 1982 congresses of League of Communists of Yugoslavia and League of Socialist Youth of Yugoslavia, on which changes in Yugoslav society were announced. As the members of the group desired changes on the Yugoslav music scene, they opted for the name Kongres.

The band had their first live performance in autumn of 1982 in Sarajevo club Sloga, on joint concert with two bands associated with New Primitivism movement, Zabranjeno Pušenje and Elvis J. Kurtović & His Meteors. Initially, Kongres collaborated with graphic artist Davor Papić, who brought up the idea of the band distributing flyers and broadcasting films and photographic slides on their concerts, but later the group would turn towards less simpler approach. Their early songs featured mostly social-related lyrics. On their first concert in the country's capital Belgrade, held in December 1982, they performed the song "Bijeli šljemovi, crna reakcija" ("White Helmets, Black Reaction"), dedicated to Yugoslav miners. However, after spending about 20 days in Herzegovina bauxite mines, where they worked as part-time clerks, the members of the band realized the song had little to do with reality of miners' life and dropped it out of their repertoire. Kongres had their discographic debut in 1984, appearing on Diskoton various artists compilation Nove snage, nove nade (New Forces, New Hopes) with the songs "Djevojka na snijegu" ("A Girl in the Snow") and "Zabava" ("Entertainment").

The band recorded their debut album Zarjavele trobente (Slovene for Rusty Trumpets) as a trio consisting of Purivatra, Buha and Subašić, as prior to the recording sessions Cerić had left the group and Džihan had moved to Zabranjeno Pušenje. The keyboards on the album were played by Zabranjeno Pušenje member Dražen Janković. The album songs were written by Purivatra and Subašić, featuring lyrics in Serbo-Croatian, with the exception of the title track and two more songs, with lyrics in Slovene. The Slovene language lyrics were provided by Aljoša Buha, whose mother was Slovene. Zoran Predin, frontman for popular SR Slovenia-based band Lačni Franz, made a guest appearance on the album, in the new version of "Zabava" and in the title track, writing the refrain for the latter. Later during the year, Predin would use the same refrain for Lačni Franz song "Jutri bom pujsa razbil" ("I'll Break the Pig in the Morning"), released on their album Slon med porcelanom (Elephant in a China Shop). Zarjavele trobente brought new wave-oriented songs, with depressive lyrics in the songs like "Zabava", "Alisa prodaje zemlju čudesa" ("Alice Is Selling the Wonderland") and "Sumrak" ("Dusk"). For the promotional tour the band was joined by guitarist Igor Ivanović (later a member of Crvena Jabuka) and keyboardist Edo Gradinčić.

After the promotional tour, the band began working on their second studio album, but soon split into two factions. They eventually reunited and started to negotiate cooperation with Marko Brecelj, but disbanded before making any recordings.

=== Post breakup ===
In 1985, Buha joined the newly-formed pop rock band Crvena Jabuka. He took part in the recording of their 1986 self-titled debut album. At the beginning of the promotional tour, on 18 September 1986, the band members were involved in a car accident which killed Buha and the group's frontman Dražen Ričl.

After Kongres disbanded, Purivatra and Subašić retired from the scene. During the Bosnian War, Subašić got wounded in Sarajevo. He has published several books: the children's book Čokolend princeza osmeha (Chocoland Princess of Smiles, 2009), novels Tečaj brzog spavanja (The Fast Sleeping Course, 2012) and Dobri – u potrazi za imenom (The Good Ones – In Search of a Name, 2015) and books of poetry Mirno spavaj Melvana (Sleep Peacefully, Melvana, 2018), Pustinjska ruža (Desert Rose, 2019), Ptice kao mi (Birds Like Us, 2021) and U Bosni budan budi (Stay Awake in Bosnia, 2022).

== Legacy ==
Zoran Predin recorded a new version of the song "Zarjavele trobente" for his 1992 album Gate na glavo (Upside Down). The song was covered by Crvena Jabuka on their 2005 studio album Oprosti što je ljubavna (Forgive Me for This Song Being a Love Song). Bosnian band Dubioza Kolektiv and Predin recorded a version of the song in December 2020, releasing it as a single.

== Discography ==
=== Studio albums ===
- Kongres (1984)
