= Zlatko Arslanagić =

Yugoslav rock musician

- Also known as: Zlaja
- Born: 22 September 1964 (age 61); Sarajevo, SR Bosnia and Herzegovina, SFR Yugoslavia
- Genres: Rock; power pop; pop rock
- Instruments: Guitar, vocals
- Years active: 1981–1992
- Formerly of: Crvena Jabuka

Zlatko "Zlaja" Arslanagić (born 22 September 1964) is a retired Bosnian and Yugoslav musician, songwriter, composer and writer, best known as former member of the popular pop rock band Crvena Jabuka.

Arslanagić started his musical career in his home city Sarajevo in the early 1980s. In the first half of the decade, he took part in the activities of the New Primitivism subcultural movement, before forming Crvena Jabuka in 1985 with vocalist and guitarist Dražen Ričl, keyboardist Dražen Žerić, bass guitarist Aljoša Buha and drummer Darko Jelčić. The band's 1986 self-titled debut album was an instant commercial success. On 18 September 1986, while on their way to Mostar to hold the first concert on the album promotional tour, the band members were involved in a car accident which killed Dražen Ričl and Aljoša Buha. The three remaining members continued the group's activity, Arslanagić taking over the role of principal songwriter and the unofficial leader of the band. From 1987 to 1991, Crvena Jabuka enjoyed large popularity in Yugoslavia, the outbreak of Bosnian War in 1992 forcing them to end their activity. Arslanagić emigrated to London and eventually to Toronto, retiring from the scene.

In addition to his work with Crvena Jabuka, Arslanagić has written songs for a number of prominent Yugoslav artists, and has published a book of poems and a book of short stories.

== Early life ==
Born to Bosnian Muslim humorist father Sead "Šišalo" Arslanagić and Bosnian Croat mother Ljubica, young Zlatko grew up in the Sarajevo neighbourhood of Koševo. After completing primary education, he began attending the city's Druga Gimnazija for his high school studies. Dabbling in prose writing, poetry, and graphic design, the youngster further developed a hobby of coming up with fictional bands' record covers with elaborate sleeves and liner notes.

== Career ==
=== Early years (1981–1985) ===
Arslanagić founded his first musical group, power pop band Ozbiljno Pitanje (Serious Question), with guitarist and vocalist Dražen Ričl "Para" and Saša Kontić. Simultaneously, the band members took an active role in the Sarajevo New Primitivism movement. Alongside several members of the bands Zabranjeno Pušenje and Elvis J. Kurtović & His Meteors, from 1981 until 1985, Arslanagić and Ričl did sketch comedy on the Top lista nadrealista segment as part of the Radio Sarajevo weekly show Primus, and in 1984, once Top lista nadrealista expanded to television, participated on the TV show's first series. Arslanagić took part in the creation of movement's humorous rock operas Kemmy (a parody of The Who's rock opera Tommy), Odisejo (a parody of Odyssey) and Bata brani Sarajevo (Bata Defends Sarajevo, a parody of the film Walter Defends Sarajevo).

=== Crvena Jabuka (1985–1992) ===
In 1985, Arslanagić and Ričl formed the band Crvena Jabuka. The band's original lineup also featured Dražen Žerić "Žera" (keyboards), Aljoša Buha (bass guitar) and Darko Jelčić "Cunja" (drums). The band members decided upon the name Jabuka (Apple) as a homage to the Beatles' Apple Records – the Beatles being Arslanagić's biggest idols. The group's 1986 self-titled debut album saw large commercial success and media attention, and the group announced nationwide promotional tour. The opening date was scheduled for Thursday, 18 September 1986 in Mostar at the Kantarevac Stadium. On the day of the concert, the band members and their small entourage left Sarajevo on their way to Mostar in three cars: Arslanagić, Ričl and Buha were in Arslanagić's Zastava 750, keyboardist Žerić and drummer Jelčić were in Žerić's Volkswagen Golf Mk1, while employees of the Zenica-based Atlas company, the organizers of the tour, were in a Zastava 1500. On a single-lane bidirectional road next to the Neretva river near the town of Jablanica, the Zastava 750 driven by Arslanagić veered into oncoming traffic colliding head-on with a truck. Buha died on the spot due to severe injuries, while Arslanagić and Ričl were transferred to Mostar city hospital, with hundreds of the city's young people gathering in front of the hospital offering to donate blood. During the following several days, Arslanagić managed to recover, while the condition of Ričl, who had suffered severe head injuries, got progressively worse. He was transferred by helicopter to Military Medical Academy in Belgrade, where he died on 1 October 1986.

After the tragedy, Arslanagić, Žerić and Jelčić decided to continue their activity, but away from the eyes of the public. The three recorded the band's second studio album, Za sve ove godine (For All These Years), releasing it in 1987 and dedicating it to Ričl and Buha. The album featured some songs that had been composed by Ričl, and, although most of lead vocals were provided by Arslanagić and Žerić, some songs featured Ričl's vocals taken off demo recordings. At the wish of the three surviving members, the album release was not followed by interviews and promotional tour. The group made a full-scale return to the scene and to nationwide popularity with their third studio album Sanjati (To Dream), Arslanagić taking over the role of the band's songwriter and the unofficial leader. During the following four years, he would write all the band's songs and direct the band's music videos. The group ended their activity with the outbreak of Bosnian War in 1992.

In 1994, Žerić and Jelčić, together with another former member of the band, multi-instrumentalist and producer Nikša Bratoš, reformed the band in Zagreb, Croatia. Arslanagić, who had in the meantime emigrated to London and eventually to Toronto, publicly disapproved the reformation of the band.

=== Other activities ===
During the 1980s and 1990s, Arslanagić wrote songs for Boris Novković, Dino Merlin, Mladen Vojičić "Tifa", Rade Šerbedžija, Plavi Orkestar and other acts from the former Yugoslav region. In 1991, he composed music for Bora Kontić's radio show Jazz Time, awarded on the Prix Futura festival in Berlin. During war years, Arslanagić composed music for Nenad Dizdarević's 1994 TV film The Awkward Age, and, together with singer Zlatan Fazlić, recorded the song "Sarajevo će biti" ("Sarajevo Will Remain") on the lyrics of Serbian and Yugoslav singer-songwriter Đorđe Balašević. The two also wrote the song "Pismo prijatelju" ("Letter to a Friend"), recorded by Bosnian and Yugoslav singer-songwriter Kemal Monteno.

Arslanagić has published two books. In 1998, his poetry book Između nekad i sad (Between Then and Now) was released. A year later, he turned to prose with his collection of 12 short stories, each dealing with Sarajevan emigrants and refugees in London, entitled Možda će sutra biti sunčan dan (It Might Be a Sunny Day Tomorrow).

== Legacy ==
The lyrics of Crvena Jabuka songs "Za sve ove godine" and "Ima nešto od srca do srca" authored by Arslanagić were featured in Petar Janjatović's book Pesme bratstva, detinjstva & potomstva: Antologija ex YU rok poezije 1967 - 2007 (Songs of Brotherhood, Childhood & Offspring: Anthology of Ex YU Rock Poetry 1967 – 2007).

== Discography ==
=== With Crvena Jabuka ===
==== Studio albums ====
- Crvena Jabuka (1986)
- Za sve ove godine (1987)
- Sanjati (1988)
- Tamo gdje ljubav počinje (1989)
- Nekako s proljeća (1991)

==== Live albums ====
- Uzmi me (kad hoćeš ti) (1990)

== Bibliography ==
=== Poetry ===
- Između nekad i sad (1998)

=== Fiction ===
- Možda će sutra biti sunčan dan (1999)
