= Sarena =

Sarena may refer to:

== People ==
- Sarena Lin (born 1971), Taiwanese-American businesswoman
- Sarena Parmar, Canadian actress

== Places ==
- Šarena Mosque
- Mosque of Atik Behram Bey, known as Šarena džamija
- Svijet je lopta šarena
