= Dražen Žerić =

Bosnian singer

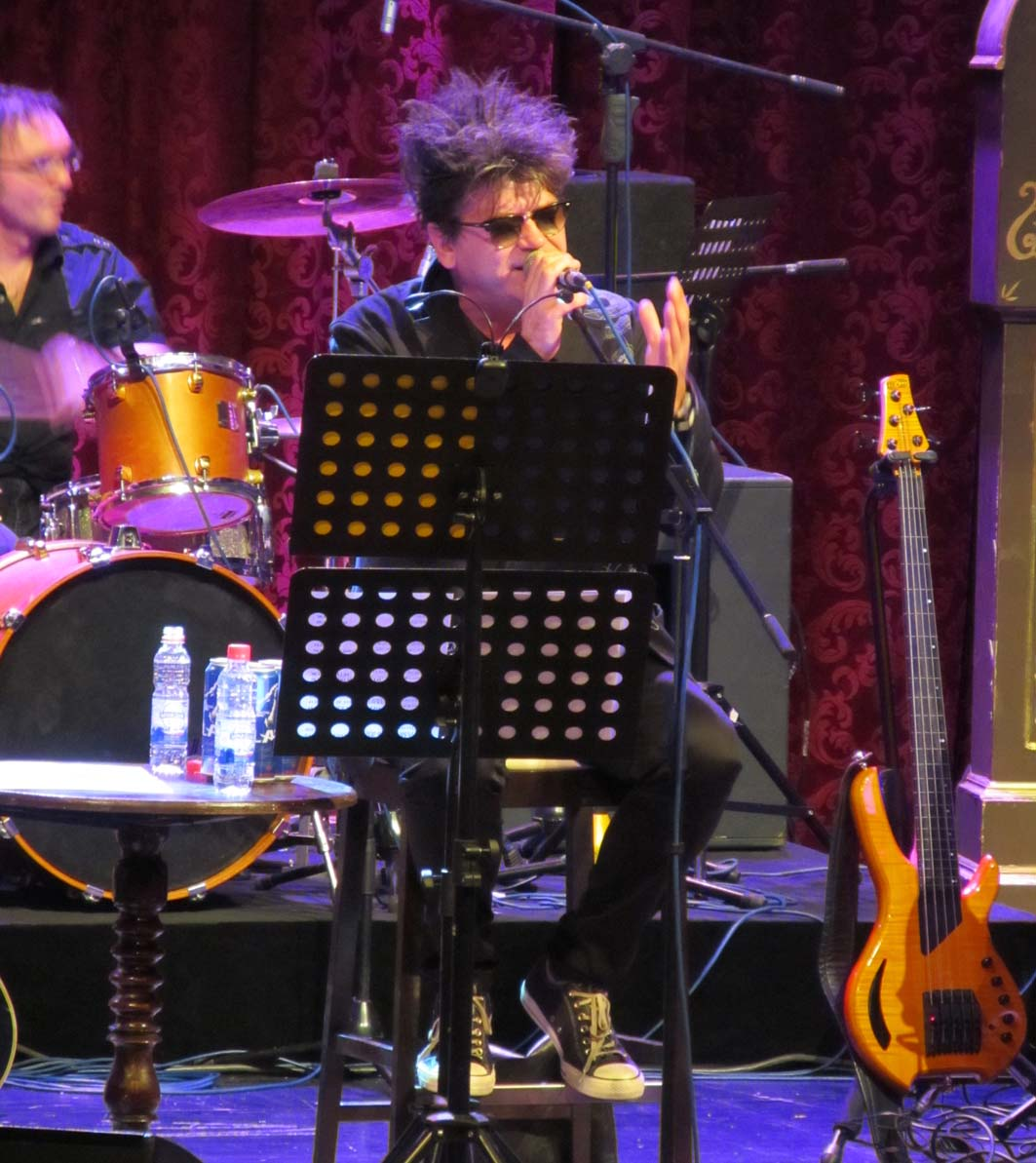
- Žera performing in 2014 at the Serbian National Theatre in Novi Sad.

Background information
- Also known as: Žera
- Born: 20 July 1964 (age 62); Mostar, SR Bosnia and Herzegovina, SFR Yugoslavia
- Genres: Pop rock; power pop; pop; folk rock
- Occupations: Singer, keyboardist
- Instruments: Vocals, keyboards
- Years active: 1985–present
- Member of: Crvena Jabuka

Dražen "Žera" Žerić (born 20 July 1964) is a Bosnian musician currently based in Croatia, best known as the vocalist for the popular pop rock band Crvena Jabuka.

Žerić started his career in 1985 as Crvena Jabuka's keyboardist. He was a member of the band's first lineup alongside guitarist and vocalist Dražen Ričl, guitarist Zlatko Arslanagić, drummer Darko Jelčić and bass guitarist Aljoša Buha. Following the large commercial success of their 1986 self-titled debut album, the band announced a nationwide promotional tour. On 18 September 1986, while on their way to Mostar for the first concert on the tour, the band members were involved in a car accident which killed Ričl and Buha. For the band's second album, the 1987 Za sve ove godine, Žerić took over vocal duties, continuing his career as the band's vocalist. The band enjoyed large mainstream popularity, until the outbreak of the Bosnian War forced them to split up. Since their reunion in 1994, Žerić has been the leader of the band, and since the departure of Jelčić in 2017, he has remained the sole original member of the group. In addition to recording 19 studio albums and 4 live albums with Crvena Jabuka, he has recorded an album in collaboration with singer-songwriter Narcis Vučina. Žerić is recognizable for his public image – most notably his spiky hair and for always wearing Converse sneakers at the band's performances.

== Early life ==
Žerić was born in the city of Mostar, in a family of Bosniak professors Nedžib and Šemsa. He grew up in Sarajevo, where he attended primary and secondary school, as well as music school, learning to play piano. He later graduated with an economics degree from the University of Sarajevo.

== Musical career ==
=== Crvena Jabuka (1985–1992, 1994–present) ===
In 1985, Žerić became a member of the band Crvena Jabuka. The band's original lineup consisted of Žerić (keyboards), Dražen Ričl "Para" (vocals, guitar), Zlatko "Zlaja" Arslanagić (guitar), Darko Jelčić "Cunja" (drums) and Aljoša Buha (bass guitar). The band's 1986 self-titled debut album saw large commercial success and media attention, the band announcing a nationwide promotional tour. On 18 September 1986, while on their way to Mostar to hold the first concert on the tour, band members were involved in a car accident near Jablaničko lake, in which Buha died on impact, while Ričl died in October 1986 from his injuries. Žerić, Arslanagić and Jelčić continued as Crvena Jabuka, releasing the band's second album Za sve ove godine in 1987, Žerić taking over the vocal duties. From 1987 to 1991, Crvena Jabuka would be one of the most successful bands on the Yugoslav rock scene.

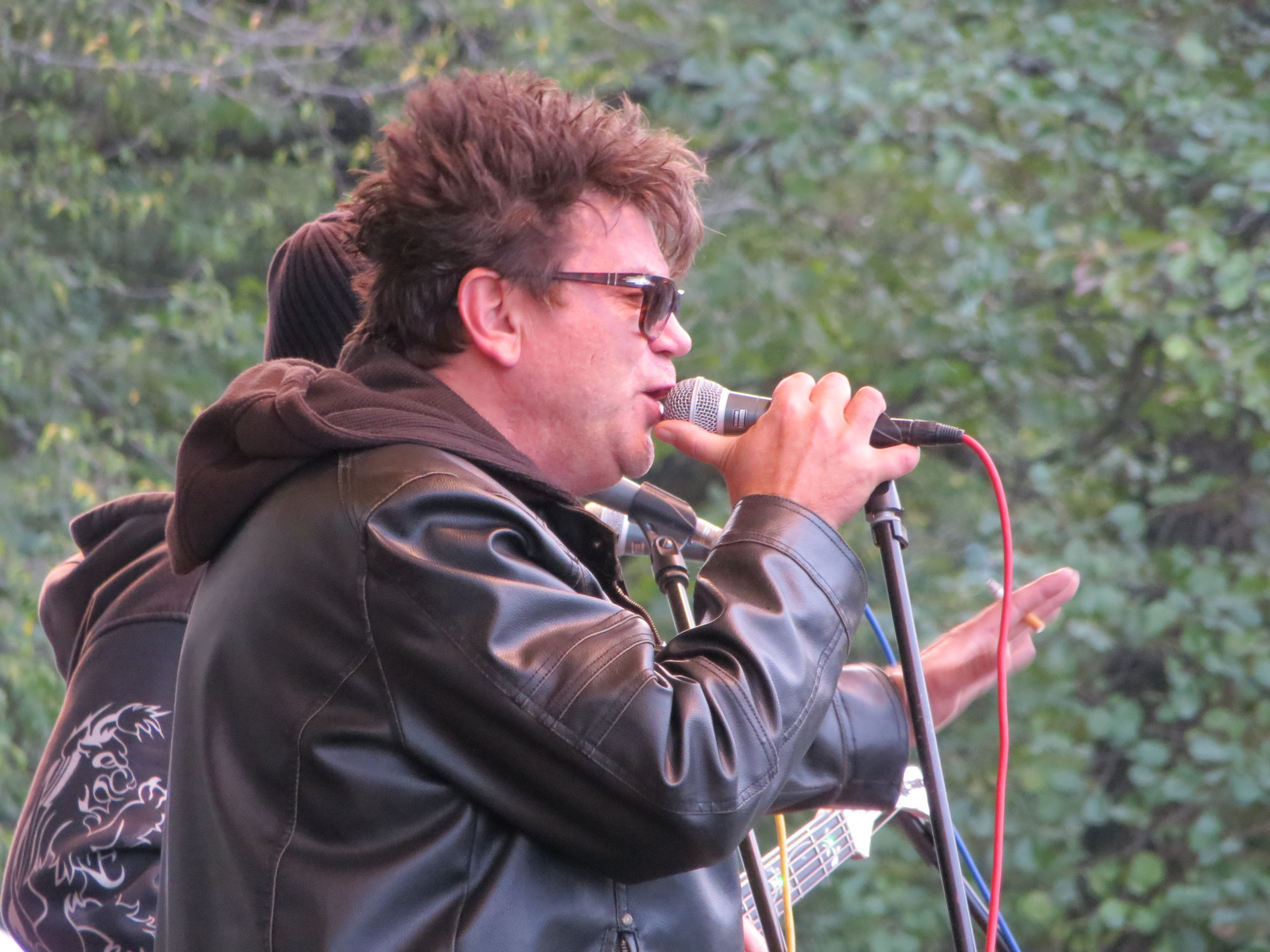
Žerić performing with Crvena Jabuka in 2016

In 1992, as the Yugoslav War advanced into Sarajevo, the band ended their activity. Žerić spent two years under the Army of Republika Srpska siege of Sarajevo doing humanitarian work and charity concerts. In 1994, he emigrated to Zagreb, where he reformed Crvena Jabuka with Darko Jelčić and multi-instrumentalist Nikša Bratoš. With principal songwriter Arslanagić out of the band, the group started to coopeerate with external songwriters, renewing their popularity in former Yugoslav republics. With the departure of Jelčić in 2017, Žerić has remained the only original member of the group.

=== Solo works ===
During the siege of Sarajevo, Žerić held a number of humanitarian concerts along with singers Kemal Monteno, Mladen Vojičić Tifa and Zlatan Fazlić "Fazla". During war years, he also recorded the song "Ostajte ovdje" ("Stay Here") on the lyrics of 19th century Herzegovinian Serb poet Aleksa Šantić. In 1999, Žerić appeared on the renewed Vaš šlager sezone (Your Schlager of the Season) festival in Sarajevo, performing the song "Proveo bih život ispod mostova" ("I Would Spend My Life Under Bridges"), written by Zlatan Fazlić.

In 2013, Žerić recorded the album Ručni rad – Sarajevo (Handicraft – Sarajevo) with singer-songwriter Narcis Vučina, featuring songs authored by Vučina.

=== Guest appearances ===
Žerić has made a number of guest appearances on albums by other artists. In 1990, he made a guest appearance on the album Samo je ljubav (Only Love Is) by Yugoslav band Kotrljajuće Kamenje, providing vocals for the title track, also featuring guest appearances by Dejan Cukić, Janez Bončina "Benč", Mladen Vojičić "Tifa", and Zorica Kondža. In 2004, he made a guest appearance in the song "Ljubav ne postoji (rođaci moji)" ("Love Doesn't Exist (My Cousins)"), released by Croatian pop Leteći Odred on their album Razglednice (Postcards). In 2011, with Serbian folk singer Indira Radić he recorded the duet "Istok, sever, jug i zapad" ("East, North, South and West"), released on her album of the same title. In 2013, he recorded the duet "Svaki dan je put" ("Every Day Is a Journey") with Croatian pop singer Antonija Šola, released on her album Nezgodna (Inconvenient One). During the same year, he recorded the duet "Crveni poljupci" ("Red Kisses") with Bosnian and Yugoslav singer-songwriter Kemal Monteno, released on Monteno's album Šta je život (What Is Life). In 2015, he recorded the duet "Ti budi tu" ("Be There") with Croatian pop singer Paula Jusić, released on her album Dvije izgubljene duše (Two Lost Souls). In 2021, he recorded the duet "Sarajevo" with Croatian musician Lana S., released on her album Avantura (Adventure).

== Personal life ==
Žerić has been living in Zagreb, Croatia since 1994. He married twenty-year-old Barbara Mačela, 24 years his junior, in a July 2008 ceremony on a boat off the coast of Šolta island. In February 2009, the couple had twin daughters, Petra and Marea.

Constant touring took toll on Žerić's health, with extensive drinking habits had been reported many times. In 1998 he was pulled over by the Croatian police on the Croatian-Slovenian border and later detained reportedly for not appearing at the Municipal Court in Zagreb where he was due for the trial in the court case in which he was accused of driving under the influence of alcohol. The case was later dismissed and Žerić was given probation.

On multiple occasions throughout 2008 and 2009, Žerić publicly expressed his opposition to what he saw as promotion of gay lifestyle in Zagreb.

In November 2017, Žerić was summoned by a Municipal Court in Zagreb to provide testimony in the libel lawsuit that Nikša Bratoš, president of the government-funded Croatian Music Union (HGU), filed against Croatia Records CEO Želimir Babogredac over Babogredac's June 2015 Slobodna Dalmacija interview claims, accusing Bratoš and his HGU team of malfeasance and blackmail in collusion with Croatia's state-run broadcaster Croatian Radiotelevision (HRT). Žerić's testimony focused on clarifying Babogredac's additional claims from the same media interview about Žerić and Željko Bebek being rejected, despite their respective long-standing careers, for the samostalni umjetnik (cultural worker) status in Croatia, a legal provision for country's prominent and HGU-approved artists entitling them to various financial benefits from the state budget. In his testimony, Žerić talked of his samostalni umjetnik application being turned down by the HGU along with an explanation that "his work has not achieved sufficient recognition", all of which made him feel "humiliated". He further stated that his appearances on the HRT had been greatly reduced, before adding he holds Bratoš responsible because "Bratoš has been holding some of the most important posts in Croatian music bodies".

== Discography ==
=== With Crvena Jabuka ===
==== Studio albums ====
- Crvena Jabuka (1986)
- Za sve ove godine (1987)
- Sanjati (1988)
- Tamo gdje ljubav počinje (1989)
- Nekako s proljeća (1991)
- U tvojim očima (1996)
- Svijet je lopta šarena (1997)
- Sve što sanjam (2000)
- Tvojim željama vođen (2002)
- Oprosti što je ljubavna (2005)
- ...Duša Sarajeva (2007)
- Volim te (2009)
- Za tvoju ljubav (2011)
- Nek' bude ljubav (2013)
- 2016 (2016)
- Nocturno (2018)
- Tvrđava (2020)
- Neka nova jutra (2022)
- Mirišu jabuke (2024)

==== Live albums ====
- Uzmi me (kad hoćeš ti) (1990)
- Riznice sjećanja (1999)
- Live (2001)
- Bivše djevojčice, bivši dječaci – Unplugged live u Lisinskom (2014)

==== Compilations ====
- Ima nešto od srca do srca (1993)
- Moje najmilije (1996)
- Antologija (2003)
- Zlatna kolekcija (2005)
- The Ultimate Collection (2008)
- Da nije ljubavi (2010)
- Najlepše ljubavne pjesme (2010)
- Christmas Limited Edition (2017)
- ''Sarajevo 1985. – 2020. (2020)

==== Box sets ====
- Original Album Collection (2013)
- 100 originalnih pjesama (2015)

==== Video albums ====
- S druge strane sjećanja (2010)

=== Solo ===
==== Studio albums ====
- Ručni rad – Sarajevo (With Narcis Vučina, 2013)
