= Top lista nadrealista =

Yugoslav sketch comedy television show

- A 1991 sketch showing two Belgian members of the European Community Monitoring Mission in Bosnia trying to incite a Bosnian Muslim and a Serb, lifelong friends, to start fighting one another during a game of pool at a Sarajevo bar.
- Genre: Sketch comedy Surreal comedy Satire; Black comedy
- Based on: "Top lista nadrealista" segment of Primus by Boro Kontić
- Written by: New primitives (radio); Nele Karajlić; Srđan "Srki" Velimirović
- Directed by: Boro Kontić; Vuk Janić; Davor Marjanović; Miroslav "Ćiro" Mandić; Benjamin Filipović; Branko Đurić Đuro
- Starring: Nele Karajlić; Branko Đurić; Zenit Đozić; Boris Šiber; Dražen Ričl; Darko Ostojić; Zlatko Arslanagić; (full list below)
- Country of origin: SFR Yugoslavia
- Original language: Serbo-Croatian
- No. of series: 3
- No. of episodes: 27 (25 regular + 2 New Year's specials)

Production
- Production location: Sarajevo
- Running time: ~ 40-50 minutes

Original release
- Network: TV Sarajevo
- Release: 1984 – 1991

Related
- Wartime Nadrealisti; Nadreality Show; Nadrealna televizija

Top lista nadrealista (Serbo-Croatian Cyrillic: Топ листа надреалиста, lit. 'The Top List of the Surrealists' or 'The Surrealists' Chart Toppers'), also known as TLN or Nadrealisti (Serbo-Croatian Cyrillic: Надреалисти, lit. 'The Surrealists'), is a Yugoslav sketch comedy and variety television show. Produced by TV Sarajevo, it aired on the nationwide Yugoslav Radio Television (JRT) public broadcasting system in three separate instalments between 1984 and 1991, having originated from a weekly fifteen-minute local radio comedy segment that was part of the Primus program on Radio Sarajevo's channel two from 1979 until 1985.

In 1984, after establishing a core radio audience locally in the city of Sarajevo, Top lista nadrealista radio segment got spun off into a television sketch series. Two more series on television followed, in 1989 and 1991, making household names of its protagonists all over SFR Yugoslavia and helping launch and solidify successful television, film, and musical careers for some of them (most notably Nele Karajlić and Branko "Đuro" Đurić).

Although eventually best known for insightful and often prophetic political humour, TLN initially relied mostly on its protagonists' youthful improvisation and ad-libbing for laughs while staying away from politics entirely. Towards the late 1980s and into the early 1990s—during the show's second and third series, respectively—a period during which some of its most memorable and enduring sketches were created, Top lista nadrealista incorporated political satire while infusing their social satire with additional surrealist and black comedy. The show's 1989-1991 popularity is reflected in some of its sketches' language and phrasing entering public vernacular. In the late 1980s and early 1990s, a number of TLN sketches dealt with the deteriorating political situation in Yugoslavia that turned out to be a prelude to the Yugoslav Wars with some sketches proving prophetic, portraying a dystopian near-future—featuring the Yugoslav state being disintegrated, the city of Sarajevo divided between different newly established states, a single family split into two clans warring over control of rooms in their apartment, UN peacekeeping forces adding fuel to the conflict, etc.—years before it became reality.

In the context of the Yugoslav Wars that had already begun as the show's third series was being filmed, Nadrealisti held a clear pacifist posture, often using absurdity and dark hyperbole when portraying rising ethnic tensions and imminent war in SR Bosnia and Herzegovina (e.g. warning that "peace may break out and ruin Bosnian harmonious war" or giving alarming instructions on "how the public should act in case of peace").

== Radio segment (1979–1985) ==
=== Background ===
Top lista nadrealista first appeared on 10 November 1979 in the form of a radio segment, airing as part of the Primus program on Radio Sarajevo's Channel Two. The segment—a 15-minute piece of free-form radio envisioned by its creator Boro Kontić as a showcase for talented local Sarajevo-area youngsters within his Primus weekly radio show—featured a group of protagonists that didn't stick around past one or two weeks.

The segment's late 1979 launch took place as part of the radio host and producer Boro Kontić's takeover of Primus a.k.a. Priče i muzika subotom (Stories and Music on Saturdays)—a weekly magazine-type radio show that had already been airing on the state-run Radio Sarajevo's Channel Two since 6 January 1979. Kontić thus inherited the weekly Saturday morning 8-11am show from the previous host Jovo Došlo who had decided to leave the radio business altogether and move back to his hometown Mostar. A young man in his mid-twenties, Kontić immediately set about infusing the show with elements of pop culture by introducing two new segments—Šta je pisac htio da kaže involving translations of the English language pop hits into Serbo-Croatian and the aforementioned Top lista nadrealista that would, over the following year and a half, become somewhat of a revolving door featuring a multitude of amateur participants none of whom would keep showing up long enough to develop any continuity.

Always on the lookout for talent to bring on the show for the Top lista nadrealista segment, by early 1981—through his musician brother Saša Kontić as well as their neighbour, Saša's classmate and Ozbiljno Pitanje bandmate Zlatko "Zlaja" Arslanagić—Boro Kontić became aware of a group of kids in their late teens from Sarajevo's Koševo neighborhood, each one involved with music as well as other forms of artistic expression. In addition to music, Arslanagić—who had also been dabbling in writing, poetry, and graphic design—attracted Kontić's attention for his hobby of coming up with fictional bands' record covers with sleeves and liner notes. Relaying Boro Kontić's offer of taking over the Top lista nadrealista segment that had been airing on Primus for some eighteen months already, Saša Kontić and Arslanagić approached Zenit Đozić and Nele Karajlić—high school seniors and two of the members of a recently formed garage punk rock band Zabranjeno Pušenje—who after some initial trepidation on Nele's part eventually accepted the offer.

=== May 1981 debut of Nele Karajlić, Zenit Đozić, and co. ===
Their [May 1981] debut segment on my Primus show—this faux terrorist takeover they came up with—wasn't bad. It had a certain energy. I mean, it wasn't uproariously funny or anything, but I found it interesting and decided to put it on the air. The segment aired on a Saturday, and two days later, the following Monday, I had a content review with the radio executive in charge. I gave him the spiel that these are new kids with a new concept for the Top lista nadrealista segment that had already been in existence. So, he had a listen and was adamant that this can not air—of course, he had no idea, and I certainly wasn't about to tell him, that it had actually aired already. Upon my questioning as to why this material is unacceptable, he began lecturing me: 'Are you not aware of what is going on in the country? Look at what's happening down in Kosovo and you're bringing these "Tupamaros" on the radio to take over the station'.

— Radio Sarajevo personality and producer Boro Kontić on Karajlić, Đozić, and co. debuting on Top lista nadrealista in May 1981.

Though the Top lista nadrealista fifteen-minute segment on Primus had already been around since November 1979, its start in earnest is considered to have taken place on Saturday, 9 May 1981 as the group of kids debuting that day—led by eighteen-year-old Nele Karajlić and nineteen-year-old Zenit Đozić—would go on to do the segment for the rest of its run on radio including eventually spinning it off into a television series. Their debut radio segment was conceptualized as a faux terrorist takeover of the radio station with insurgents reading out their manifesto along with a list of demands. These included: more young bands on radio and television, Dom mladih (Youth Center) being returned to those it nominally belongs to—the youth, removal of older radio executives from the station, more punk on the daily radio playlists, etc. Unbridled, raw, and unscripted, the debut segment done by Nele Karajlić, Zenit Đozić, Roki, Rizo Petranović, Zlaja Arslanagić, and Saša Kontić set the tone for what was to come: juvenile behaviour, infantile jokes, raucous street energy, with occasional cogent observation hinting at deeper social issues—all seldom heard prior on the buttoned-up state-run radio in communist Yugoslavia. The only adults in the mix were the Primus host and executive producer Boro Kontić and his sound engineer Husein Vladavić, both of whom were present behind the scenes during the segment tapings, but did not take part in them on the microphone.

Right after the debut show, Boro Kontić asked his younger brother Saša not to come any longer. Decades later, Karajlić would speculate Kontić did so realizing right away the amount of scrutiny segment would be under from the radio higher-ups thus not wanting the added pressure of having a close family member there. Roki also stopped coming after the debut show. In turn, Karajlić brought along Boris Šiber, a neighbourhood buddy from Koševo, while Zenit brought in Dražen "Para" Ričl, another Koševo lad.

Though the attendance was spotty throughout its entire run on radio, five guys—Nele Karajlić, Zenit Đozić, Zlatko Arslanagić, Boris Šiber, and Dražen Ričl—established themselves as the core of the Top lista nadrealista segment over its initial weeks and months on the air. At first reserved and somewhat skeptical about the long-term radio prospects for this raw new group of kids, the segment's producer and Primus host Kontić would soon become one of their biggest media supporters, devoting a lot of his time and energy to championing their work in and outside of radio. According to Kontić, after completing several initial weekly radio segments with the new Top lista nadrealista kids, the catalyzing occurrence for his own personal realization about their potential and talent was witnessing the energy and crowd reaction at an early Zabranjeno Pušenje (at that point still a demo band fronted by Karajlić with Đozić on drums) club gig in June 1981 at the Cedus venue's small room in Sarajevo. Likening the experience to "feeling a change in atmospheric pressure within that room", Kontić fully embraced the role of a behind-the-scenes facilitator and nurturer for this group of young performers.

Not formally trained in performing arts and completely unfamiliar with the specifics of performing on radio, the five-member group of Koševo kids initially relied on the intuitive techniques they picked up while performing for their social circle in a Koševo apartment building basement that had been serving as their practice facility. Over time, they began somewhat deferring to the more experienced Kontić, even the sound engineer Vladavić, accepting and incorporating their performing advice and content notes. Since each one of the five performers was simultaneously also involved with a band—Karajlić, Đozić, and occasionally Šiber with Zabranjeno Pušenje and Ričl and Arslanagić with Ozbiljno Pitanje—music became the focal point of many of the radio sketches. A lower music school graduate and by far the most talented guitarist among the group, Ričl usually provided the musical support on guitar in the sketches.

=== Local popularity in Sarajevo ===
The group's creative modus operandi on radio consisted of getting together every Thursday in Šetalište, a kafana on Sutjeska Street (around the corner from the Radio Sarajevo building at 7 Danijela Ozme Street) a couple of hours before their scheduled 9pm studio taping in order to come up with bits for that week's segment. Under their command, the segment became a complete free format—sometimes a single bit for the entire fifteen minutes, other times a weekly recap through satirical commentary touching on recent local and global events, ranging from hyperlocal human interest newspaper stories to global news events such as the downing of Korean Air Lines Flight 007, assassination of Indira Gandhi, and Ronald Reagan's re-election. Since the attendance was always very unstable, the taping often involved bringing random Šetalište patrons into the studio for bits. Uncoordinated and chaotic as well as airing at an unpopular timeslot, Saturdays at 10:15am, when most of its target demographic is fast asleep, the segment nevertheless rapidly gained popularity among young listeners and soon became the staple of Primus. Getting around the early timeslot, many youngsters resorted to recording the segment on audio cassettes and sharing; scenes of young people in bars listening to segments they taped off radio were not uncommon around the city.

Though mostly free of direct political messaging or even mild allusions (and in no way injurious to SFR Yugoslavia's unquestioned values and sacred cows such as the Communist League, Comrade Tito, and People's Liberation Struggle so as to trigger a swift ban), the segment's irreverence and increasing listenership still led to it being closely monitored by the Radio Sarajevo executives and consequently tweaked and censored as they deemed necessary. Kontić attended most of the content review meetings Friday mornings during which he reportedly often resorted to multiple forms of trickery in order to save various pieces of material from being cut. Having a sudden coughing fit, starting random conversations to divert attention, and purposely including a more outrageous piece of material for the executives to glam onto, so that the piece the group really wanted in gets through were just some of the ways Kontić used during content review sessions in order to try to reduce the censorship of the Top lista nadrealista segment. According to Karajlić, part of his own personal fun of listening to the Saturday morning radio segment broadcast was realizing which part of the material they had recorded two days earlier on Thursday never made it to air.

As its popularity grew, 'Top lista nadrealista' segment slightly expanded from topical humour to include longer bits, played in installments. Some of the more popular sketches included "Bata brani u Sarajevu" (a takeoff on the famous partisan film Valter brani Sarajevo) and rock opera "Kemmy" (parody of The Who's Tommy).

It wasn't long before a move to television was suggested and first steps to that end arranged by TV Sarajevo. However, following a few screen tests that essentially consisted of the group doing their radio schtick before cameras, the television executives deemed them too unpolished and sent them back to radio.

By March 1983, some of the individuals in and around this often intertwining group of Sarajevo-based budding radio personalities, musicians, and comedians (most of them from the same Koševo neighbourhood) came up with an idea of putting all of that activity under a single definition banner—thus giving birth to New Primitives, an entity that functioned as something between a (sub)cultural movement and a cheap public relations ploy.

=== Musical synergy ===
Most members of the on-air radio crew were simultaneously involved with music. Since 1980, Karajlić had been fronting a garage rock group called Zabranjeno Pušenje together with his buddy and neighbour Sejo Sexon while early lineups included Đozić on drums with even Elvis J. Kurtović and Šiber spending some time in the band. Furthermore, Zlatko Arslanagić and Dražen Ričl played together in a band called Ozbiljno Pitanje that disbanded when Ričl started playing alongside Kurtović and Rizo Petranović in a band called Elvis J. Kurtović & His Meteors, initially the most established group of the lot since they were the first to get a recording contract (with ZKP RTVLj).

The synergy of weekly radio appearances along with constant gigging around Sarajevo in student hangouts (Trasa, Kuk, Cedus, etc.) created a bit of local buzz that benefited both the radio and music side of things. By early 1984, Zabranjeno Pušenje finally got the record deal they were after (with Jugoton no less) while Top lista nadrealista developed enough of a following among the Sarajevo youth that it got a second shot on television in June 1984.

=== Radio segment in parallel with expansion to television and after ===
The weekly radio segment continued in parallel with the television episodes and the success of Pušenje's debut album.

Good album sales combined with the satisfactory reception of the television episodes prompted the release of Top lista nadrealista radio material on audio cassette tape by Diskoton. Produced by Boro Kontić, it consisted of the troupe's best radio sketches. However, the so-called 'Marshal affair' that Nele Karajlić and Zabranjeno Pušenje got themselves into put a damper on many activities. First, the 11-episode Top lista nadrealista run on television ended in late December 1984. Then, the Top lista nadrealista audio cassette tape's promotional cycle got blocked on administrative orders from above — becoming unavailable for sale in general circulation, only through traveling salesmen. Nevertheless, it still managed to sell 10,000 copies.

Finally, during March 1985, the Top lista nadrealista segment got taken off radiowaves for good.

== First television series (1984) ==
Top lista nadrealista's expansion to television came about through the TV Sarajevo folk music programming executive Erna Perić who came up with an idea for a prime time show of folk music numbers with comedy sketches in-between each song. Though not at all fitting into the folk music milieu, seen as inherently rural and traditionalist, the group nonetheless accepted the offer of being the comedy filler on a folk music show as it meant exposure to a whole new audience they would normally never reach on radio. They started shooting sketches in April 1984, a few months following the Sarajevo Winter Olympics. In addition to the radio five of Nele, Zenit, Para, Šiber, and Zlaja, the group was now joined by soon-to-be twenty-two-year-old Branko Đurić, local journalism student, musician, and aspiring actor, whom they had befriended at the Dedan kafana in Sarajevo where he had a knack for spontaneously entertaining the patrons by doing impressions.

Top lista nadrealista television show debuted on 2 June 1984, airing Tuesdays at 8:00pm on TVSa2 (TV Sarajevo's channel 2) while also shown in the rest of SFR Yugoslavia through the JRT system. Directed by Davor Marjanović who was joined by Vuk Janić after a few episodes, and with main on-camera protagonists Nele Karajlić, Branko Đurić, Zenit Đozić, Boris Šiber, and Dražen Ričl as well as Zlatko Arslanagić who participated in later episodes, the television sketches mostly retained the structure and form of their radio skits. Around 45 minutes long, each episode features between five and eight folk music numbers performed by popular folk singers of the day like Halid Bešlić, Ferid Avdić, Šaban Šaulić, Hanka Paldum, Zehra Deović, Himzo Polovina, Zaim Imamović, Sejo Pitić, Usnija Redžepova, Amela Zuković, etc. Many of the sketches in-between the folk numbers are tied together by a common theme and presented in instalments over multiple episodes.

A number of sketches revolve around parodying a fictional TV station—usually as the opening bit of each episode—with recurring characters: news anchor Mitrije Crnica (played by Karajlić) and the station's security doorman played by Đuro whose catchphrase "Ćega, ba" caught on quickly. Another running parody based on Shakespeare's Romeo and Juliet features young lovers Sejo and Seada falling in love despite their respective families supporting bitter cross-town football rivals FK Sarajevo and FK Željezničar. They also lampooned Star Trek with a running multiple-installment bit called "Burek u svemiru" that portrays a space crew on a mission to find the best burek in the universe. Another running bit portrays Fu-Do (played by Đozić), righteous vigilante well-versed in martial arts who protects the residents of several local Sarajevo neighbourhoods from various ills—including ruthless smugglers selling counterfeit clothing and public market (pijaca) re-sellers offering produce at exorbitantly marked-up prices. Furthermore, actual events taking place as the series was shot—such as Yugoslavia's preparation for Euro 1984 or Rajko Janjanin's European Cup hat-trick versus Benfica—provided fodder for the sketches. Allusions to political figures and events were off-limits on the show. By closely sifting through sketch ideas and their implementation, applying censorship as needed, the state-owned and party-controlled TV Sarajevo made sure the show stays away from overt political commentary and direct social criticism.

Though it proved a challenge initially, it didn't take too long for the television show to start getting a bit of a wider following. Its core demographic—Sarajevo youth—that had been on board all along continued to be there, but getting viewership in other demographics and other parts of the country took some time. Once obtained, this newly found popularity was in large part based on the abundance of colloquialisms and local Sarajevo street parlance—none of which could be seen up to that point on the buttoned-up Yugoslav TV. In total, eleven episodes were aired during the first season. Considering each one of the six protagonists was in their early twenties, the sketches expectedly centred around exuberance and improvisation, which dominated over the written material.

=== Reception ===
According to Karajlić, speaking decades later in 2010, the first instalment of Nadrealisti was "the result of our youthful hysteria and it relied more on raw energy than brains". Elvis J. Kurtović, a friend of the crew who was involved with the show in limited creative capacity, said in 2005: "Back when we were kids those Top lista nadrealista episodes were done by people who didn't know jack-squat about television and who shot everything in a single take and on the first try. When you watch those episodes today you can see that many of them are badly directed and produced. Not all of them, there're some good ones, but the first series is particularly horrible in this regard".

Đuro, the new member of the group, rose to prominence immediately with his broader acting range setting him apart from the rest of the self-taught performers. Incorporating him into the group as a new piece, in addition to figuring out how to perform for the cameras for the first time, required adjustment compared to how Nadrealisti functioned on radio. However, since even their radio cast had always been fairly fluid from week to week, integrating a new member proved to be seamless as part of the group's generally frenzied, all-comers frame of mind. The arrival of Đuro also set the stage for a formation of a new dynamic within the group that would end up being much more pronounced in subsequent TLN television series: with original members Nele and Zenit on one side—framing the concept via providing initial ideas and connective tissue for the sketches—and "funnier and more talented performer" Đuro on the other side doing most of the heavy lifting on the acting front.

==== Zabranjeno Pušenje takes off nationally as result of Top lista nadrealista on television ====
As mentioned, in parallel with Top lista nadrealista, Karajlić also fronted a punk rock band called Zabranjeno Pušenje that released its debut album barely two months before the show's premiere on television. Released by Jugoton, the record was out in limited circulation of 3,000 copies, a number clearly indicative of the label's modest expectations, especially after the poor sales of Elvis J. Kurtović & His Meteors' debut album barely a few months earlier. However, following Top lista nadrealista's television debut, the Zabranjeno Pušenje album started selling surprisingly well, eventually exceeding 100,000 copies sold.

Though none of the remaining five Top lista nadrealista performers were official Zabranjeno Pušenje members at this point, the two projects frequently overlapped, creating synergy that ultimately helped the popularity of both. By early summer 1984, Top lista nadrealista started getting bit of a wider audience, which in turn helped the sales of the Zabranjeno Pušenje album. By late September 1984, the band sold enough records for a Yugoslavia-wide tour to take place. Karajlić thus devoted more time to the band's tour than to the TV show whose production was now scheduled around his band obligations. The band's success on the road was rapid, and by November they were selling out sports arenas. During a concert in Rijeka in late November 1984, Karajlić made a pun after the Marshall amplifier broke down, jokingly announcing to the crowd: "The Marshall has croaked! .... The amplifier, that is", indirectly alluding to the late Yugoslav lifetime leader Josip Broz Tito who held the military rank of Marshal and who had died four years earlier. The seemingly innocuous statement delivered in jest in between two songs at a rock concert soon created a firestorm of controversy as various state and communist party bodies went after the band, targeting Karajlić specifically. For weeks and months during late 1984 and early 1985, the print media was full of articles condemning the band over the statement while its gigs were being cancelled. In order to cope with the new situation, the band opted to stay out of the public eye for the time being, which also meant putting the show on hiatus indefinitely.

== Second television series (1989) ==
=== Background ===
It would be more than five years before Top lista nadrealista returned for the second installment in fall 1989. In the meantime, some of its protagonists achieved a lot of success in other arenas.

Nele Karajlić had become a country-wide celebrity and media personality as the vocalist of Zabranjeno Pušenje, which had put out two more albums since its debut and was about to release its fourth. His TV profile had further been raised by starring in Timothy John Byford's 1988 kids show Tragom ptice Dodo on TV Sarajevo. A couple of years earlier, Karajlić had overcome the 'Marshal affair' with the verbal offense court case against him eventually concluded with a monetary fine.

Branko Đurić was in the process of becoming well-known due to his budding acting career with roles in Audicija comedy show as well as films like Ovo malo duše, Dom za vješanje, Kuduz, and Kako je propao rokenrol while also maintaining a bit of a musical career with Bombaj Štampa.

Finally, after its commercially disappointing debut, Dražen Ričl made one more album with Elvis J. Kurtovich & His Meteors, but left right after in spring 1985 as the group effectively disbanded anyway. At the time of their breakup, Ričl had already been in the process of reuniting with old Ozbiljno Pitanje bandmate Zlatko Arslanagić to establish a new band with a softer, pop-rock sound. The two soon unveiled Crvena Jabuka, a group that immediately started taking off commercially. However, Ričl died on 1 October 1986 from the injuries sustained in a car accident two weeks earlier near Jablanica en route to a Mostar gig in support of their debut album. Zlatko Arslanagić was also in the same car but survived the crash, and after getting over severe depression decided to continue Crvena Jabuka, but did not return for Top lista nadrealista's second series.

=== Preparation and shooting ===
The reactions I was getting from people [in summer 1989] when I would mention that I had been hired to do the Top lista nadrealista new series were not positive at all. The dominant reaction was to the effect that "New Primitivism is yesterday's news" and that "bringing the whole thing back won't be interesting". And at the time when we were going through script preparations, this filled me with concern. Not to the point of considering quitting, but it underscored this feeling I had that something is missing to bring this thing to a new level. So this became my primary goal — finding that new plane so that the new TLN can stand on its own rather than just repeating the same schtick from five years prior.

— Top lista nadrealista second series director Ćiro Mandić on the atmosphere ahead of the show's 1989 series.

Nadrealisti thus reconvened in August 1989 without Ričl and Arslanagić, but with new protagonists Darko Ostojić, Dado Džihan, and Dražen Janković, as well as Srki Velimirović who kept behind the camera but contributed with sketch ideas and scriptwriting. Their getting together this time was organized and coordinated by Slobodan Terzić, TV Sarajevo executive in charge of culture and arts programming. Noticeably more mature and structured, the 8-member group was now directed by thirty-four-year-old Miroslav "Ćiro" Mandić who had already accumulated a bit of a cinematic CV behind him, having directed a feature film Život radnika two years earlier and having been one of Emir Kusturica's ADs on the Palme d'Or-winning When Father Was Away on Business in 1985.

The written material courtesy of Karajlić and Velimirović became tighter and more polished compared to the 1984 series as sketches now started hinting at deeper social issues and trends. The upgrade in production and organizational matters was noticeable from the start of the second series. Implemented in practice, it meant that rather than having sketch excerpts that revolve around a theme over an entire episode, the show incorporated different sketches of varied structure and the music numbers got reduced.

Just like the first series from 1984, the core of the second series also included a parody of television programming cliches with various TV characters — an unnamed news anchor played by Karajlić and his newscast director played by Ðurić as well as a plethora of roving reporters played by all cast members — framing the sketches. Predicting future political and social events, both in Yugoslavia and abroad, became another staple of the second series — with Murphy's law governing these forecasts where the worst outcome is usually the one that ends up occurring. Finally, many, including Karajlić and Nadrealisti executive producer Terzić, talked about the second series sketches being infused with satirical techniques from the works of Radoje Domanović such as Vođa and Kraljević Marko po drugi put među Srbima.

The shooting dragged on for months throughout late summer and fall 1989. It was not without personnel issues, including director Mandić essentially quitting early on due to creative differences with the guys before he got persuaded to continue on via intervention by executive producer Terzić who even enlisted Emir Kusturica's help in this regard. Mandić's relationship with the main on-camera performers Nele and Đuro was apparently so fraught initially that Đuro at one point even began lobbying for Mandić to be replaced with Goran Gajić, an old friend of the New Primitivism guys whom Đuro had shot The Fall of Rock and Roll with earlier that year. Mandić came back into the fold soon after quitting as the two sides found a modicum of common ground creatively.

=== Airing ===
The 1989 series is when they came into their own as a true comedic and satirical force. Before that, in 1984, their sketches were part of a folk music show, which was fun and interesting, but I found the material to be frivolous and inconsequential. In 1989 they stopped ignoring political and real-life issues around them. And thanks primarily to their spiritus movens Nele Karajlić's talents, they came up with some truly memorable stuff.

— Top lista nadrealista executive producer Slobodan Terzić on the show's second series.

Once it started airing in late fall 1989, the series achieved critical praise though it took several episodes for the general public to catch on. Once that happened, the series exploded all over SFR Yugoslavia with risque sketches that relied on absurdity as the starting point becoming widely quoted classics. Most also provided many thinly veiled hints and winks in reference to the current political and social situation.

One sketch featuring "Swedish workers escaping their politically unstable homeland and seeking refuge in Yugoslavia only to find low-skill jobs for local ruthless small-business bosses", parodied the decades-long drain of Yugoslav nationals to Western Europe in search of better employment opportunities.

Another classic sketch, featuring Rade Pendrek, a forty-year-old street cop, having a nightmare about waking up in a country where uniformed intellectuals round up disobedient cops to university halls in order to forcibly correct their misbehaviour by having professors aggressively read Nietzsche and play Mozart to them as worker riot-squads armed with shovels roam the streets outside breaking up police protest rallies, humorously hinted and winked at a wide range of actual events: from the Žuta Greda incident during the Anti-bureaucratic revolution to the party-initiated media and institutional campaigns against dissenting University of Sarajevo professors and lecturers Nenad Kecmanović, Vojislav Šešelj, and Esad Ćimić.

On occasion, because of the content's political sensitivity, trickery had to be used by the show's network-assigned executive producer Slobodan Terzić in front of his TV Sarajevo superiors in order to ensure the intended material makes it to air. This was particularly true when the material featured overt mockery of Yugoslav political figures such as the now-famous 14th Yugoslav Communist League Congress dubbing sequence (framed by Nele and Đuro as "closing time at the Kod dva bela goluba kafana"), which was recorded on a Wednesday night in January 1990—less than a day before the scheduled airtime for that episode on Thursday in prime time—while the Congress itself had been held days earlier and its political fallout was still huge. Nele and Đuro stayed up all night riffing and dubbing their voices over the politicians' speeches. In the morning, Terzić reportedly approved the sketch, prepared it for airing later that night, and then went home where he unplugged his home telephone in anticipation of the calls he knew he would be getting from his superiors during airtime. The sketch aired that night, causing a political stir, but it also got a great reaction from the viewers.

Seven episodes were shot and aired during the season. An additional New Year's special episode was aired on 31 December 1989. A year later, another New Year's episode was shot and aired.

=== 1990 Yugoslavia-wide tour ===
The highly rated television series led to a surge of popularity for all things Top lista nadrealista and New Primitivism throughout SFR Yugoslavia. The group decided to cash in immediately by releasing a 3-tape VHS box-set as well as going on a country-wide arena tour, which had a commercial tie-in with one of Yugoslavia's most prominent tourist operators Unis Tours. The tour featured a unique business arrangement in that Unis Tours purchased it outright for a fixed price prior to its start thus acquiring its entire eventual gate revenue—an indication of the popularity of Top lista nadrealista in Yugoslavia at the time and the company's certainty that the tour would generate profit.

Booked and organized by the Zabranjeno Pušenje manager Dragan "Kiki" Zurovac, the joint Zabranjeno Pušenje, Bombaj Štampa, and Top lista nadrealista live show featuring a mixture of live music and sketch comedy played to sold out sports arenas across the country throughout the first part of 1990. The tour started in Belgrade on January 11 and 12, continuing in Novi Sad on the 14th, followed by Zagreb on the 19th and Split on the 21st, Ljubljana the 29th, and Sarajevo on February 1 and 2, Skopje the 13th, and Priština the 14th. Due to its popularity, many dates were added after the initial ones. However, relationships within the group had already deteriorated to the point of guys barely tolerating one another over revenue sharing and, through it, an unspoken recognition of who the main protagonist(s) is/are, as stated by Karajlić in his autobiography:

At this point our internal relations were so damaged by fatigue and jealousy that it became practically impossible to even get six members of Top lista and four guys from Pušenje together for a single project. Each one of us thought his own point-of-view to be 100% right. Personal skulduggery became a daily occurrence while certain guys wouldn't even bother trying to conceal their mutual dislike and loathing anymore. Each guy wanted his own share, above and beyond any reasonable amount, while a concern or even simple understanding for the financial well-being of others was completely ignored. One guy wanted the most money figuring himself to be the most popular one. I wanted no less than him because I thought I was just as popular. Another guy was unhappy with his status because we're playing his songs and he's getting the same as everyone else. Yet another guy insisted on getting exactly one-tenth of total revenue....and so on.

== Third television series (1991) ==
Top lista nadrealista third series began shooting on 4 October 1991, finishing in early November 1991. Produced again by TV Sarajevo, the material was divided into seven episodes that aired weekly throughout late 1991 and early 1992.

== Members ==
- Nele Karajlić (radio segment, TV seasons 1, 2, and 3)
- Zenit Đozić (radio segment, TV seasons 1, 2, and 3)
- Branko Đurić (TV seasons 1, 2, and 3)
- Boris Šiber (radio segment, TV seasons 1 and 2)
- Darko Ostojić (TV season 2 and 3)
- Dražen Ričl (radio segment and TV season 1)
- Zlatko Arslanagić (radio segment and TV season 1)
- Dražen Janković (TV seasons 2 and 3)
- Dado Džihan (TV season 2)
- Srđan "Srki" Velimirović (TV seasons 2 and 3)
- Davor Dujmović (TV season 3)
- Davorin Šegulja (TV season 3)
- Elvis J. Kurtović (TV season 2)
- Zlaja Ivanišević (TV season 3)

=== Screenwriters, directors & producers ===
- Nele Karajlić (writer, radio segment & TV seasons 1, 2, and 3)
- Srđan "Srki" Velimirović (writer, TV seasons 2 and 3)
- Boro Kontić (producer and director, radio segment)
- Erna Perić (producer, TV season 1)
- Davor Marjanović (director, TV season 1)
- Vuk Janić (director, TV season 1)
- Slobodan Terzić (producer, TV seasons 2 and 3)
- Miroslav "Ćiro" Mandić (director, TV season 2)
- Benjamin Filipović (director, TV season 3)

=== Guests in sketches ===
- Emir Kusturica
- Dragan Stojković Piksi
- Dejan Savićević
- Predrag Pašić
- Braco Dimitrijević
- Mladen Vojičić Tifa
- Zdravko Grebo
- Izet Curi
- Rambo Amadeus
- Bora Čorba
- Davor Gobac
- Sejo Bukva
- Saša Lošić
- Dino Merlin
- Juka Prazina

== Hrkljuš ==
Hrkljuš is a fictional sport created for the series. In one episode of the show, a game appeared to be broadcast live. The players (any number) stand in a circle, at arms' length from each other. The leader of the game throws a ball (made of mops) to someone in the circle. Players continue passing the ball to each other. When the ball falls from someone's hands, that player hits himself in forehead with his fist, and yells: "Domene!" (meaning My bad!). When the leader of the game yells: "Hrkljuš!", the owner of the ball is the winner. "Hrkljuš" is any player who is out of the game. When only one player remains in the game, he is declared the winner. The game's name immediately found its place in slang of ex-Yugoslav languages. It usually means something stupid, with no sense at all; obstinately insisting on doing something the wrong way; taking part in a situation with vague rules; persistence on backwardness and anachronistic habits.

In 1991, a computer game for Commodore 64 was launched by the Radojević brothers from Arilje. Besides the standard rules (ball throwing and hitting own forehead with fist), a league competition mode was also introduced.

== Offshoots ==
=== Wartime Nadrealisti ===
A radio segment using the name 'Top lista nadrealista' aired as part of Dežurni mikrofon programme on Radio BiH during part of the Sarajevo siege.

On 9 May 1992 against the backdrop of rapidly deteriorating security situation in the city of Sarajevo as well as the rest of Bosnia-Herzegovina, Radio Sarajevo got restructured by merging its channels one, two, and three as well as its channel 202 into a single channel that officially got renamed Radio BiH. Boro Kontić who had performed program director duties at Radio Sarajevo's channel two since 1990 now continued as one of the more influential executives at Radio BiH. Right away, he decided to bring back Dežurni mikrofon, an hour-long political magazine that for years aired on old Radio Sarajevo's channel one. The new timeslot was Sundays at 9am and its first broadcast in renewed form aired on 24 May 1992.

In late June 1992, several months into the Bosnian War with the city already firmly divided between the neighbourhoods and surrounding areas held by the Bosnian Serb Army (VRS) and the central neighbourhoods controlled by the Bosnian Muslim-dominated Army of the Republic of Bosnia and Herzegovina (ARBiH), Kontić decided to re-assemble the group that made Top lista nadrealista by giving them a 15-minute segment on Dežurni mikrofon. For the very first gathering, he managed to find many of the individuals previously involved with the show or New Primitives who were still in the city at the time: Đuro, Zenit Đozić, Šiber, Srki Velimirović, Elvis J. Kurtović, Zlatko Arslangić, Sejo Sexon, and Saša Petrović, as well as new faces Haris "Gigo" Aljević, Haris Memija, and Almir "Batko" Čehajić. Đuro and Zlatko Arslanagić fled Sarajevo soon afterwards so that the remaining protagonists did the 15-minute weekly radio shows in the second part of 1992 and into 1993. Made in irregular circumstances in a besieged town with war raging all around, the primary objective of the short weekly segment was boosting citizen morale though very few could even hear it due to electrical power being in scarce supply so that the show would open with lines such as "good evening to all three of you who still have generators". The radio segment ran until July 1993.

In August 1993, after 50 odd shows on radio, the group shot and aired four television episodes. One war-time sketch showed Serbs arresting obviously innocent Czech tourists who got lost on their way to seaside as Muslim extremists and terrorists. Other sketch shows how a Bosniak "Super Imam" heals a child of Chetnik spirit.

=== Nadreality Show ===
Nadreality Show was made in 2007 as a partial reunion of some of the old crew from Top lista nadrealista. Of the returning protagonists Zenit Đozić, Elvis J. Kurtović, and Darko Ostojić were present, along with a slew of new actors.

Federalna televizija alongside RTL Televizija and B92 broadcast Nadreality Show in 2007 with few sketches. The main person in the sketches was Zenit Đozić.

=== Nadrealna televizija ===
In fall of 2012, Nele Karajlić began preparations for a sketch comedy series, marking his return to the format after more than twenty years. On 12 December 2012, the pilot episode of Nadrealna televizija appeared on 1Prva, drawing high viewership rates.

Directed by Milorad Milinković, the series got picked up and 10 episodes were shot throughout spring and summer 2013. The episodes aired from 3 September 2013 until 15 November 2013.

=== Nadreality Show 2 ===
During 2017, sketches of Nadreality Show 2 were shot and broadcast on Federalna televizija as the continuation to the original first series of Nadreality Show.

== See also ==
- New Primitivism
- Zabranjeno Pušenje
- Elvis J. Kurtović & His Meteors
- Comedy in Bosnia and Herzegovina
