= U tvojim očima =

Studio album by Crvena Jabuka
- Released: January 17, 1996
- Recorded: 1995
- Studios: Rockoko Studio, Zagreb
- Genre: Pop
- Length: xx:yy
- Label: Croatia Records / Tutico
- Producer: Nikša Bratoš

Crvena Jabuka chronology
Ima nešto od srca do srca (1993)	U tvojim očima (1996)	Moje najmilije (1996)

U tvojim očima is the sixth studio album by the Sarajevo band Crvena jabuka. The album was originally released on January 17, 1996.

== Background ==
In 1993, Žera took part in the first Bosnian selection for a representative at Eurovision with the song "Monroe". The song won the 4th place

In 1994, he moved to Croatia. The following year, he recorded a duet with Severina—song "Ti si srce moje" on her album Trava zelena.

== Content ==
This album was the first to have Crvena jabuka in their new lineup. There were many songwriters on the album including Saša Lošić.

The album's hit single was "Sanjam te" which was performed by Dražen Ričl, and Aljoša Buha before their deaths in 1986. Then it was re edited by the rest of the band.

There were some guest appearances on this album. First was Alen Vitasović on the song "Vraćam se tebi seko" as well as Saša Lošić on "Bijeli Bozić". Originally, Tifa was supposed to perform "Vraćam se tebi seko" with band, but it hadn't appeared. Version with Tifa leaked on the Internet many years later.

Although the album is called U tvojim očima, there is no such song on the album according to the track listing. Though the phrase is mentioned on some songs such as "Sanjam te", and "Kao da sanjam". Also what is unique about this album is that next to 1991's Nekako s' Proljeca it is missing the band's logo-a red apple.

Album also includes cover of COD's hit "Deni". Cover also contain sample of "Jedna mala plava na ramenu mi spava" by Pro Arte.

== Track listing ==
1. Ne Govori Više
2. Kad ćes mi doć?
3. Sanjam Te
4. Vraćam se tebi Seko
5. Stari Moj
6. Sad je Srce Stijena
7. Iza Prozora
8. Deni
9. Sjećanja
10. Kao da sanjam
11. Radio
12. Mahala
13. Bijeli Božić

== Personnel ==
- Darko Jelcic - drums, percussion
- Danijel Lastric - keyboards
- Kresmir Krestalen - bass
- Drazen Zeric - vocals
- Niksa Bratos - violin, mandolin, keyboards, synthesizer, guitar
- Mario Vukušić Jimmy - guitar
- Darija Hodnik - backing vocals
- Jana Nemacek - backing vocals
- Alen Vitasović - guest vocals on track 4
- Saša Lošić - guest vocals on track 13
