= Svijet je lopta šarena =

Studio album by Crvena jabuka
- Released: December 22, 1997
- Recorded: September – November 1997
- Studios: Sound & Vision Studio, Makarska; Rockoko Studio, Zagreb
- Genre: Pop
- Length: xx:yy
- Label: HNZ Croatia Records / Tutico
- Producer: Nikša Bratoš

Crvena jabuka chronology
U tvojim očima (1996)	Svijet je lopta šarena (1997)	LIVE (1998)

Svijet je lopta šarena is the seventh studio album recorded and released by the Sarajevo band Crvena jabuka. It was recorded through 1997 and released near the middle of 1998.

== Music on this album ==
The most popular ballads on the album are "Vjetar" (The Wind), and "Stizu me sjećanja" (Memories are Coming to Me).

== Track listing ==
1. Svijet je lopta šarena
2. Vjetar
3. Mozart
4. Na mom licu tople ruke
5. Sestra srca moga
6. Jukebox
7. Zauvijek
8. Stižu me sjećanja
9. Imaš me u šaci
10. Da mi je do nje
11. Umoran
12. Reci mi
13. Tebi je do mene stalo

== Band members ==
- Darko Jelčić: drums, percussion
- Danijel Lastrić: keyboards
- Krešimir Kaštelan: bass
- Dražen Žerić: vocals
- Nikša Bratoš: harmonica, clarinet, keyboards, synthesizer, guitar
- Mario Vukušić Jimmy: guitar

=== Additional musicians ===
Additional personal includes Darija Hodnik, Jana Nemček and Mirza who sang background vocals on track 8.
