= Comedy in Bosnia and Herzegovina =

Comedy has a long and rich tradition in Bosnia and Herzegovina, and its people have long been associated with humor in various forms. The humor is usually directed towards the different ethnic groups in the former Yugoslavia, and there are many racial slurs, but they are usually taken lightly.

== Examples ==
During the 1980s and 1990s there was a series of popular comedy shows, most notably Audicija, and Top Lista Nadrealista. The shows, translated as Auditions and Top List of Surrealists featured early performances by many well known Bosnian, Croatian and Serbian actors and musicians. Both shows were re-incarnated to various degrees during the 1990s and onwards, with new casts and material.

Most "settings" would have a representative (if the sketch was racially orientated) from Serbia, Montenegro, Bosnia, and Hercegovina. This combination would cause calamity and comedy would begin creating itself.

The popular protagonists of many jokes in Bosnia are Mujo, Suljo and Fata (sometimes Mujo, Haso and Fata). Mujo and Haso have recently been brought to life, in a series of sketches based on some of the more popular jokes, widely available online and in video and DVD formats.
