= Crvena jabuka (album) =

Crvena Jabuka

Studio album by Crvena Jabuka
- Released: March 22, 1986
- Recorded: January – February 1986
- Studios: SIM studio, Zagreb
- Genres: New wave, pop rock, hard rock
- Length: 36:03
- Label: Jugoton
- Producer: Željko "Jappa" Brodarić

Crvena Jabuka chronology
| Crvena Jabuka (1986) | Za sve ove godine (1987) |

Crvena Jabuka is the first studio album by Sarajevo-based Bosnian band Crvena Jabuka. It was recorded in January and February 1986, and the official release date was 22 March 1986.

This album was the first (and only) album to have the band in its original lineup. All songs on this album were written by Zlatko Arslanagić and Dražen Ričl.

After the release of their self-titled debut album, Crvena Jabuka was scheduled to play a concert on 18 September 1986. The concert never happened since a serious car crash near Jablanica killed bass player Aljoša Buha at the scene and guitarist and vocalist Dražen Ričl, who died nearly two weeks later in a hospital of crash-related injuries.

This album cover, designed by Davor Papić, originated the band's logo. The front cover depicts a naked woman with a red apple painted across her buttocks. Subsequent albums always used the red apple in some fashion; for example Sanjati showed a man holding a red apple. The only two albums that didn't feature this trait were Nekako s proljeća and U tvojim očima.

It was recorded at Croatia Records Studio, and then lacquer cut at Abbey Road Studios.

== Track listing ==
| No. | Title | Lyrics | Music | Length |
|---|---|---|---|---|
| 1. | "Bježi kišo s prozora" ("Rain get away from the window") | D. Ričl | D. Ričl | 3:16 |
| 2. | "Mojca, Mojca" | Z. Arslanagić | | 4:09 |
| 3. | "Kad je noć hladna i zvjezdana (Emira)" ("When the night is cold and full of stars (Emira)") | D. Ričl | | 3:27 |
| 4. | "On je poput djeteta (100 na jednoga)" ("He is like a child (100 on one)") | Z. Arslanagić | | 3:44 |
| 5. | "Učiniću sve da te zadovoljim" ("I will do everything to satisfy you") | Z. Arslanagić | | 4:17 |
| 6. | "Sa tvojih usana" ("From your lips") | Z. Arslanagić | | 3:43 |
| 7. | "Nek' te on ljubi (kad ne mogu ja)" ("Let him love you (If I can not)") | Z. Arslanagić, D. Ričl | D. Ričl | 3:13 |
| 8. | "Dirlija" | Z. Arslanagić | | 4:00 |
| 9. | "Bivše djevojčice, bivši dječaci" ("Former girlfriends, former boyfriends") | Z. Arslanagić | Z. Arslanagić, D. Ričl | 3:20 |
| 10. | "Neka se sanja" ("Let it dream") | Z. Arslanagić | | 4:14 |

== Personnel ==
- Dražen Ričl – guitar, vocals
- Zlatko Arslanagić – rhythm guitar
- Darko Jelčić – drums, percussion
- Aljoša Buha – bass guitar
- Dražen Žerić – piano, organ, keyboards, vocals
