= Crvena Jabuka =

Bosnian-Herzegovinian music band

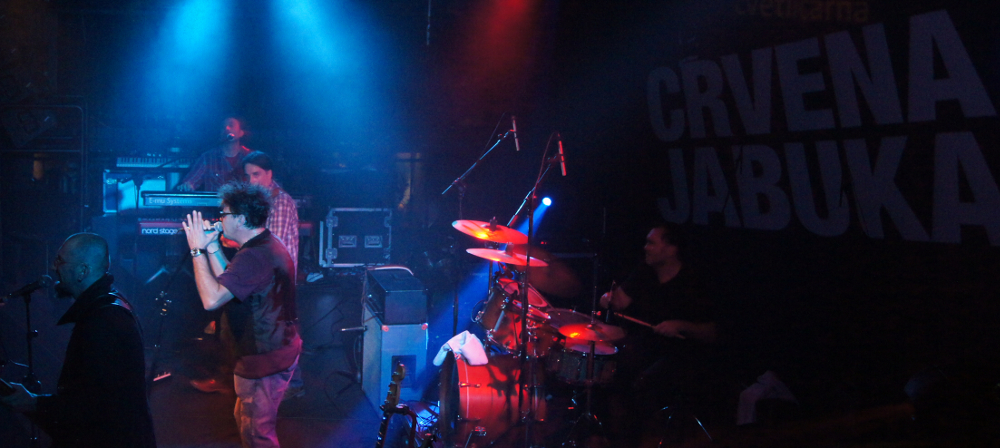
- Crvena Jabuka performing in Ljubljana in 2016

Background information
- Origin: Sarajevo, SR Bosnia and Herzegovina, SFR Yugoslavia (1985–1991); Zagreb, Croatia (1994–present)
- Genres: Pop rock; power pop; pop; folk rock
- Years active: 1985–1991; 1994–present
- Labels: Jugoton, Croatia Records
- Members: Dražen Žerić; Krešimir Kaštelan; Adrian Borić; Stjepan Šarić; Dario Duvnjak
- Past members: Dražen Ričl; Zlatko Arslanagić; Aljoša Buha; Darko Jelčić; Nikša Bratoš; Srđan Šerberdžija; Zlatko Volarević; Igor Ivanović; Zoran Šerbedžija; Mario Vukušić; Danijel Lastrić; Džimi Kurfirst; Zlatko Bebek; Damir Gönz; Josip Andrić; Marko Belošević; Tomislav Skrak; Igor Matković
- Website: crvena-jabuka.com

Crvena Jabuka (transl. Red Apple) is a pop rock band originally formed in Sarajevo, SR Bosnia and Herzegovina, SFR Yugoslavia in 1985, and since 1994 based in Zagreb, Croatia. The group gained nationwide popularity during its initial run, and has continued to enjoy success in former Yugoslav republics since the band's 1994 reformation.

The band's forming members, vocalist and guitarist Dražen Ričl "Para" and guitarist Zlatko Arslanagić "Zlaja", were in the early 1980s involved in the Sarajevo-based New Primitivism subcultural movement. Influenced by the 1960s British rock, the two formed Crvena Jabuka with keyboardist Dražen Žerić "Žera", drummer Darko Jelčić "Cunja" and bass guitarist Aljoša Buha. The band's self-titled debut album, released in 1986, was an instant commercial success, bringing large attention of the public and the media to the band. On 18 September 1986, while on their way to Mostar to hold the first concert on the album promotional tour, the members of the group were involved in a traffic accident, in which Ričl and Buha lost their lives.

After the accident, the remaining three members, Arslanagić, Žerić and Jelčić, decided to continue as Crvena Jabuka, releasing the band's second album Za sve ove godine in 1987, but without giving interviews or holding promotional performances. They made a full-scale comeback to the scene with the 1988 album Sanjati, Žerić taking over the vocal duties and Arslanagić taking over the role of the band's leader and songwriter. The album was recorded with a new member, multi-instrumentalist Nikša Bratoš, who would in the following years also be in charge of album production. The group released two more highly successful studio albums, enjoying large popularity on the late 1980s Yugoslav rock scene, before the outbreak of the Bosnian War forced them to end their activity in 1992.

In 1994, Žerić, Jelčić and Bratoš reformed Crvena Jabuka in Zagreb. The group continued their career collaborating with external songwriters, most prominently Zlatan Fazlić, Saša Lošić, Miroslav Drljača "Rus" and Dino Šaran, scoring a number of hits during the following years and renewing their popularity in former Yugoslav republics. On their later releases, the band made a shift to more pop-oriented sound, recording a number of duets with prominent acts from former Yugoslav republics. Since Jelčić's departure in 2017, Žerić has remained the only original member of the band.

== History ==
=== Origins (1981–1985) ===
The band's origins can be tracked back to 1981, when guitarist Zlatko "Zlaja" Arslanagić and guitarist and vocalist Dražen "Para" Ričl, both high school students at the time, formed the power pop band Ozbiljno Pitanje (Serious Question) in Sarajevo. Beside Arslanagić and Ričl, the band featured vocalist Saša Kontić, bass guitarist Benjamin Levi, drummer Radmilo "Hare" Gavrilović and keyboardist Dražen Janković. After the band split up in 1983, Ričl joined the band Elvis J. Kurtović & His Meteors, and both him and Arslanagić took an active role in the Sarajevo New Primitivism movement. Alongside the members of Elvis J. Kurtović & His Meteors and Zabranjeno Pušenje, the two took part in the humorous sketches recorded for Radio Sarajevo show Primus, and later in the satirical TV show Top lista nadrealista. Arslanagić took part in the creation of movement's humorous rock operas Kemmy (a parody of The Who's rock opera Tommy), Odisejo (a parody of Odyssey) and Bata brani Sarajevo (Bata Defends Sarajevo, a parody of the film Walter Defends Sarajevo).

=== Formation and instant popularity (1985–1986) ===
Crvena Jabuka logo, designed by graphic designer Davor Papić. Papić designed the cover for the band's debut album and would continue to collaborate with the band on their future releases.

After Elvis J. Kurtović & His Meteors disbanded in 1985, Ričl and Arslanagić formed Crvena Jabuka in May of the same year. The original lineup of the band also featured keyboardist Dražen Žerić "Žera", drummer Darko Jelčić "Cunja" and bass guitarist Aljoša Buha, the latter formerly playing in the band Kongres. Initially, the band members considered to name the group Mačak Fric (Fritz the Cat), but eventually opted for the name Crvena Jabuka. They decided upon the name Jabuka (Apple) as a homage to the Beatles' Apple Records – the Beatles being Arslanagić's biggest idols. They opted to use the adjective Crvena (Red) in the name as two other Sarajevo bands with colors in their names, Bijelo Dugme (White Button) and Plavi Orkestar (Blue Orchestra), already enjoyed large popularity in Yugoslavia, and as the three colors (blue, white and red) were featured on the Yugoslav flag.

Soon after the formation, Crvena Jabuka was spotted by the editors of the country's biggest record label Jugoton, and was offered a contract and recording conditions of high standard. Their self-titled debut album was produced by former Metak leader Željko Brodarić "Jappa", who also recorded the duet "On je poput djeteta (100 na jednoga)" ("He's Like a Child (100 to One)") with Ričl. The album cover, featuring a red apple painted on naked female buttocks, was created by designer Davor Papić, who would continue to collaborate with the band on their future releases. The album brought songs authored by Arslanagić and Ričl and inspired by the 1960s British scene – the song "Učiniću sve da te zadovoljim" ("I'll Do Anything to Satisfy You") featured the guitar riff from The Rolling Stones's "(I Can't Get No) Satisfaction", and the song "Bivše djevojčice, bivši dječaci" ("Former Girls, Former Boys") featured the verse "I volio bi' umrijeti prije nego ostarim" ("I hope I die before I get old", from The Who's "My Generation"). The album was an instant commercial success, the songs "Bježi kišo s prozora" ("Get Off the Window, Rain"), "Neka se sanja" ("May All Dream"), "Nek te on ljubi (kad ne mogu ja)" ("May He Kiss You (If I Can't)"), folk-influenced "Dirlija" and the ballad "Sa tvojih usana" ("From Your Lips") seeing large airplay and popularity across Yugoslavia.

During the summer of 1986, the band held first promotional performances. They had several joint performances with other Yugoslav bands, including Đavoli and Električni Orgazam, and had several television appearances. On 6 September they performed, alongside other Yugoslav acts, on a large open-air concert at Belgrade's Marx and Engels Square.

=== Car accident (1986) ===
In September 1986, Crvena Jabuka announced their first Yugoslav tour, the announcement being followed by large attention of the country's media. The opening date was scheduled for Thursday, 18 September 1986 in Mostar at the Kantarevac Stadium. On the day of the concert, the band members and their small entourage left Sarajevo on their way to Mostar in three cars: Ričl, Arslanagić and Buha were in Arslanagić's Zastava 750, keyboardist Žerić and drummer Jelčić were in Žerić's Volkswagen Golf Mk1, while employees of the Zenica-based Atlas company, the organizers of the tour, were in a Zastava 1500. On a single-lane bidirectional road next to the Neretva river near the town of Jablanica, the Zastava 750 driven by Arslanagić veered into oncoming traffic colliding head-on with a truck. Buha died on the spot due to severe injuries, while Arslanagić and Ričl were transferred to Mostar city hospital, with hundreds of the city's young people gathering in front of the hospital offering to donate blood. During the following several days, Arslanagić managed to recover, while the condition of Ričl, who had suffered severe head injuries, got progressively worse. He was transferred to the Military Medical Academy in Belgrade by helicopter, but the Academy's staff could do little to help. He died on 1 October 1986, aged 24.

=== Second album (1987) ===
After the tragedy, Arslanagić, Žerić and Jelčić decided to continue their activity, but away from the eyes of the public. The three recorded the band's second studio album, Za sve ove godine (For All These Years), releasing it in 1987 and dedicating it to Ričl and Buha. The album was, as the band's debut, produced by Željko Brodarić "Jappa", but with more acoustic guitar-oriented sound, with minimalist arrangements and dominated by ballads. The album featured some songs that had been composed by Ričl, and, although most of lead vocals were provided by Arslanagić and Žerić, some songs featured Ričl's vocals taken off demo recordings. At the wish of the three surviving members, the album release was not followed by interviews and promotional tour. The album was well-received by the audience, with the songs "Tugo, nesrećo" ("(Oh,) Sadness, Misery"), "Uzmi me kad hoćeš ti" ("Take Me When You Desire") and "Nema više vremena" ("There's No More Time") becoming hits.

=== Full-scale return, nationwide popularity, disbandment (1988–1991) ===
The band made a full-scale return to the scene with the 1988 album Sanjati (To Dream). The album was recorded with a new collaborator, multi-instrumentalist and former Valentino member Nikša Bratoš. Bratoš also produced the album, as would be the case with the band's future releases. All the songs were authored by Arslanagić, with the exception of "Twist and Shout" cover entitled "Sviđa mi se ova stvar" ("I Like This Song"). For the promotional concerts, the group was joined by bass guitarist Srđan Serberdžija and keyboardist Zlatko Volarević "Dilajla", the latter a former member of Đavoli, the two soon becoming official members of the band. With the hit songs "Ima nešto od srca do srca" ("There's Something from Heart to Heart"), "Malo ćemo da se kupamo" ("We're Going to Bathe for a Little While"), "Zovu nas ulice" ("The Streets Are Calling Us") and "Oči su se navikle na mrak" ("Eyes Got Used to the Darkness") the band repeated the success of their previous two releases, selling over 250,00 copies of the album. At the 1988 MESAM festival they were proclaimed the Rock Band of the Year, and the readers of the music magazine Pop Rock polled them the Pop Band of the Year. In 1990, Sanjati brought them the Ampex Golden Reel Award, an international music award for records that were recorded and mixed entirely on Ampex audio tape, and which subsequently sold enough units to achieve gold record status in their country of origin.

In the spring of 1989, the band released the album Tamo gdje ljubav počinje (Where Love Begins). Once again, all the songs were composed by Arslanagić, with the exception of the intro for "Ples nevjernih godina" ("Dance of Unfaithful Years"), taken from the 1977 song "Rock On" by the band Hunter. The album brought new hits for the band – "To mi radi" ("Do It to Me"), "Neka vrijeme mijenja se" ("May Times Change"), "Volio bih da si tu" ("I Wish You Were Here") and the title track. In May 1989, the group held a series of concerts for the children of Yugoslav gastarbeiters in Switzerland. The concerts saw large attention in the Yugoslav media, as up to that point Yugoslav guest workers in the West were entertained mainly by Yugoslav folk singers. For the promotional tour across Yugoslavia, they were joined by guitarist and keyboardist Igor Ivanović, who came in as the replacement for Bratoš, who decided to dedicate himself to studio work exclusively. On 23 June, the band, despite strong summer rain, held a sold-out concert at Belgrade's Tašmajdan Stadium. The recordings from their concerts in Sarajevo, Belgrade, Zagreb, Banja Luka and Titograd appeared on the 1990 double live album ''Uzmi me (kad hoćeš ti). Beside live versions of the band's hits, the album featured four new songs, "Kad kazaljke se poklope" ("When Clock Hands Coincide"), originally released in 1989 on promo single just before the New Year Holidays, "Sve što imaš ti" ("All That You Have"), "Suzo moja, strpi se" ("Be Patient, My Tear") and a live cover of the song "Bacila je sve niz rijeku" ("She Let Everything Go Down the River"), originally recorded by Sarajevo band Indexi.

In the spring of 1991, the band released their fifth studio album Nekako s proljeća (In the Springtime). All the songs were written by Arslanagić. The album was recorded with guitarist Zoran Šerbedžija, who came in as the replacement for Ivanović. The title track featured guest appearance by Sarajevo veteran singer-songwriter Kemal Monteno. The song "Da nije ljubavi" ("If There Wasn't Love") featured a musical quotation from the traditional song of the same title, and the song "Nemoj da sudiš preoštro o meni" ("Don't Judge Too Harshly About Me") was named after the epitaph from the grave of Brian Jones. During 1991, Arslanagić also composed music for Bora Kontić's radio show Jazz Time, awarded on the Prix Futura festival in Berlin.

The political and ethnic tensions in Yugoslavia prevented the band from promoting the album on tour. The group performed at Yutel for Peace, an anti-war concert held at Sarajevo's Zetra Hall. With the outbreak of the Bosnian War, the band ended their activity.

=== Band members activity during war years (1992–1994) ===
During the war years, Arslanagić, together with singer Zlatan Fazlić, recorded the song "Sarajevo će biti" ("Sarajevo Will Remain") on the lyrics of Serbian and Yugoslav singer-songwriter Đorđe Balašević. The two also wrote the song "Pismo prijatelju" ("Letter to a Friend"), recorded by Kemal Monteno. Arslanagić composed music for Nenad Dizdarević's 1994 TV film The Awkward Age. Žerić recorded the song "Ostajte ovdje" ("Stay Here") on the lyrics of 19th century Herzegovinian Serb poet Aleksa Šantić.

=== Reformation, new releases and renewed popularity (1994–2017) ===
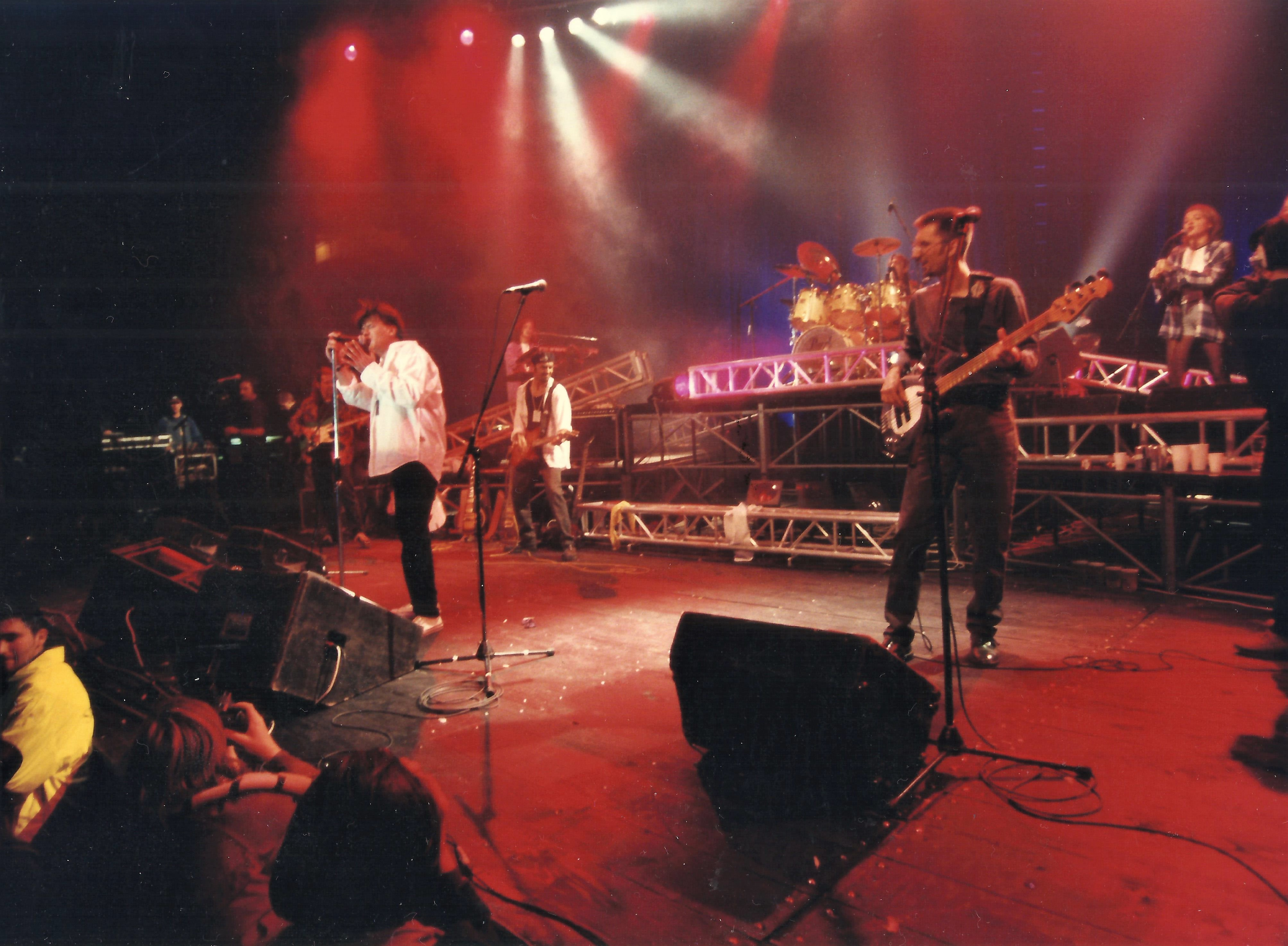
Crvena Jabuka performing in Zagreb in 1996.

In 1994, Žerić and Jelčić emigrated from Sarajevo to Zagreb, where they reformed Crvena Jabuka with Nikša Bratoš. The lineup also included guitarist Mario Vukušić, bass guitarist Krešimir Kaštelan, and keyboardists Zlatko Volarević and Danijel Lastrić. Arslanagić, who had in the meantime emigrated to London and eventually to Toronto, publicly disapproved the reformation of the band. In the summer of 1995, the band went on a massive comeback tour across former Yugoslav republics.

The band recorded their comeback album U tvojim očima (In Your Eyes) in Croatian village Bošnjaci. The album was produced by Bratoš and released in 1996. With former principal songwriter Arslanagaić out of the band, Crvena Jabuka turned to contracting with external songwriters. The album songs were written by Zlatan Fazlić and former Plavi Orkestar frontman Saša Lošić "Loša", but the album also included some old and previously unrecorded songs authored by Ričl. The album also featured a cover of the song "Denny" by 1970s Sarajevo band Cod. The song "Vraćam se tebi, seko" ("I'm Coming Back to You, Sis") featured guest appearance by Istrian singer Alen Vitasović, while the band's version of "White Christmas", entitled "Bijeli Božić", featured guest appearance by Saša Lošić. Lošić also joined Crvena Jabuka as guest on the followup promotional tour. Beside former Yugoslav republics, the band also toured Germany, Austria and Denmark.

For the band's following studio album, entitled Svijet je lopta šarena (The World is a Colourful Ball), the songs were written by Lošić, Fazlić, Jure Stanić, Karlo Barbarić and Miroslav Drljača "Rus". The album was produced by Bratoš and recorded with the new guitarist Džimi Kurfirst. On 13 and 14 February 1997, the band held two Valentine's Day unplugged concerts in Zagreb's OTV amphitheatre. The concerts featured the band's new member Zlatko Bebek on acoustic guitar. The concerts also featured klapa Nostalgija (Nostalgia), violinist Emir Gabrić, and backing vocalists Darija Hodnik, Jana Nemeček and Mirza Treterac. On the concerts, Bratoš demonstrated his multi-instrumentalist skills by playing acoustic guitar, mandolin, sitar and fipple. The recordings from the concerts were released on the live album Riznice sjećanja (Vaults of Memories), named after a song from the band's 1989 album Tamo gdje ljubav počinje. Alongside the band's old songs, the album included the new song "Moj grad" ("My City"). During the year, the band also toured North America for the first time, catering to diaspora-heavy areas in the United States and Canada, and Žerić appeared on the renewed Vaš šlager sezone (Your Schlager of the Season) festival in Sarajevo, performing the song "Proveo bih život ispod mostova" ("I Would Spend My Life Under Bridges"), written by Zlatan Fazlić. In 1999, Željka Stanisavljević and Damir Ivanović, both members of Crvena Jabuka fan club from Osijek, published the book Priča o Crvenoj Jabuci: pogled iz publike (The Story of Crvena Jabuka: View from the Audience).

In 2000, Crvena Jabuka released the album Sve što sanjam (Everything I Dream Of). The songs were authored by Fazlić, Miroslav Drljača and Letu Štuke member Dino Šaran. The song "Niko nije lud da spava" ("No One's a Fool to Go to Bed") featured musical quotation from the 1960s Yugoslav TV series Our Little Place opening theme and guest appearance by klapa Nostalgija. Even though Nikša Bratoš produced the album, by the time of the recording he was no longer a full-time member of the band. A year later, the band released the live album Live, with the recording of their concert in Zagreb's House of Sports held on 4 December 1996.

The band's following studio album Tvojim željama vođen (Led By Your Wishes) was released in 2002. All the songs on the album were authored by Dino Šaran. Alongside new songs, the album featured a cover of Indexi song "Sanjam" ("I'm Dreaming"). The album was recorded by the band's new lineup, featuring, alongside Žerić, Jelčić and Kaštelan, former Novi Fosili member Damir Gönz (guitar) and Josip Andrić (keyboards). Zlatko Bebek had in the meantime moved to Prljavo Kazalište, and Lastrić had gotten his PhD in psychology and become a university professor.

The band celebrated their 20th anniversary with a concert held in Sarajevo's Mirza Delibašić Hall on 6 April 2005. During the same year, they released their tenth studio album, Oprosti što je ljubavna (Forgive Me for This Song Being a Love Song). The songs were authored by Fazlić, Šaran, Saša Dragić and former Nemoguće Vruće (Impossibly Hot) member Asmir Spahić. The song "Znam" ("I Know") featured guest appearance by singer-songwriter Arsen Dedić, and the song "11-ta Božja zapovijed" ("God's 11th Commandment") featured guest appearance by actor Tarik Filipović. As bonus tracks, the album featured a new version of "Tugo, nesrećo" and a cover of "Zarjavele trobente" ("Rusty Trumpets"), originally written by Aljoša Buha and Zoran Predin and recorded by Buha's band Kongres in 1984. At the time of the album release, Andrić was replaced by new guitarist Marko Belošević. The band marked their anniversary with concerts in other major former Yugoslav cities, with guest appearances by the band's former members and pop singer Severina.

The band's 2007 studio album ...Duša Sarajeva (...The Soul of Sarajevo), co-produced by Žerić and the band's former member Igor Ivanović, brought the hit "Tamo da putujem (Rastanak)" ("To Travel There (Parting)"), originally recorded by Arsen Dedić, composed by himself on the poem of early 20th century Croatian poet Tin Ujević. The album also featured a cover of the song "Znaš da nekad..." ("You Know that Sometimes..."), originally recorded by Igor Ivanović's former band Uhuhu on their 1988 self-titled album. The song "Napiši jednu ljubavnu" ("Write a Love Song") featured a musical quotation from Nino Rota's "Love Theme from The Godfather".

In 2009, Crvena Jabuka released the studio album Volim te (I Love You). The album was produced by Žerić and Branimir Mihaljević, who also assisted on keyboards and backing vocals. Jelčić did not take part in the album recording and was replaced by studio musicians during the recording sessions, but did perform on the promotional tour. The album featured songs authored by Narcis Vučina, Boris Novković, Denis Dumančić, Branimir Mihaljević, and, for the first time since 1991, Zlatko Arslanagić. The song "Godinama" ("Over the Years") featured guest appearance by folk singer Halid Bešlić and a musical quotation from Queen's "You Don't Fool Me". The song "Jazz.ba" featured guest appearances by actor Enis Bešlagić and Ahmed Al Rahim. The album closes out with the band's version of traditional sevdalinka "Voljelo se dvoje mladih" ("Two Young People Were in Love"), also known as "Žute dunje" ("Yellow Quinces"), recorded with Dalmatian tamburica orchestra Lira. In 2010, the band celebrated their 25th anniversary with a concert held in Skenderija hall in Sarajevo held on 24 April, and with the release of the four-disc compilation album Da nije ljubavi. The compilation featured a selection of their old songs, as well as new versions of their old hits "Dirlija", featuring guest appearance by rapper Shorty, "Kad kazaljke se poklope" and "Sa tvojih usana". The compilation also featured a cover of Indexi song "Balada" ("Ballad") and ITD Band song "Lagano umirem" ("I'm Dying Slowly"), and Žerić's duet with Hari Varešanović "Dok Miljacka protiče" ("While Miljacka Is Flowing"), originally recorded for Dejan Radonić's film Ghosts of Sarajevo. During the same year, the band also released the DVD S druge strane sjećanja (On the Other Side of Memory), with music videos from various phases of their career.

In 2011, the band released the studio album Za tvoju ljubav (For Your Love), produced by Mihaljević, and, as the band's previous album, recorded with studio musicians. The song "Kletva" ("Curse") featured guest appearance by singer Željko Bebek, while the song "Ljubav je jaka" featured guest appearance by Saša Lošić. By the beginning of 2012, Žerić decided to revert the band to a quintet, the new lineup featuring Žerić, Jelčić, Kaštelan, guitarist Tomislav Skrak and keyboardist Igor Matković. Their following studio album, the 2013 Nek' bude ljubav (Let There Be Love), featured guest appearances by Kemal Monteno, on the song "Crveni poljupci" ("Red Kisses"), former Hari Mata Hari guitarist Karlo Martinović, on "Vjerujem" ("I Believe"), and Serbian band Neverne Bebe, on "Ovo je kraj" ("This Is the End"). The album also featured a live version of "Godinama", performed with Halid Bešlić in 2010. During the same year, the band released the box set Original Album Collection, featuring reissues of the band's first five albums. In 2013, Žerić recorded the album Ručni rad – Sarajevo (Handicraft – Sarajevo) with singer-songwriter Narcis Vučina, featuring songs authored by Vučina.

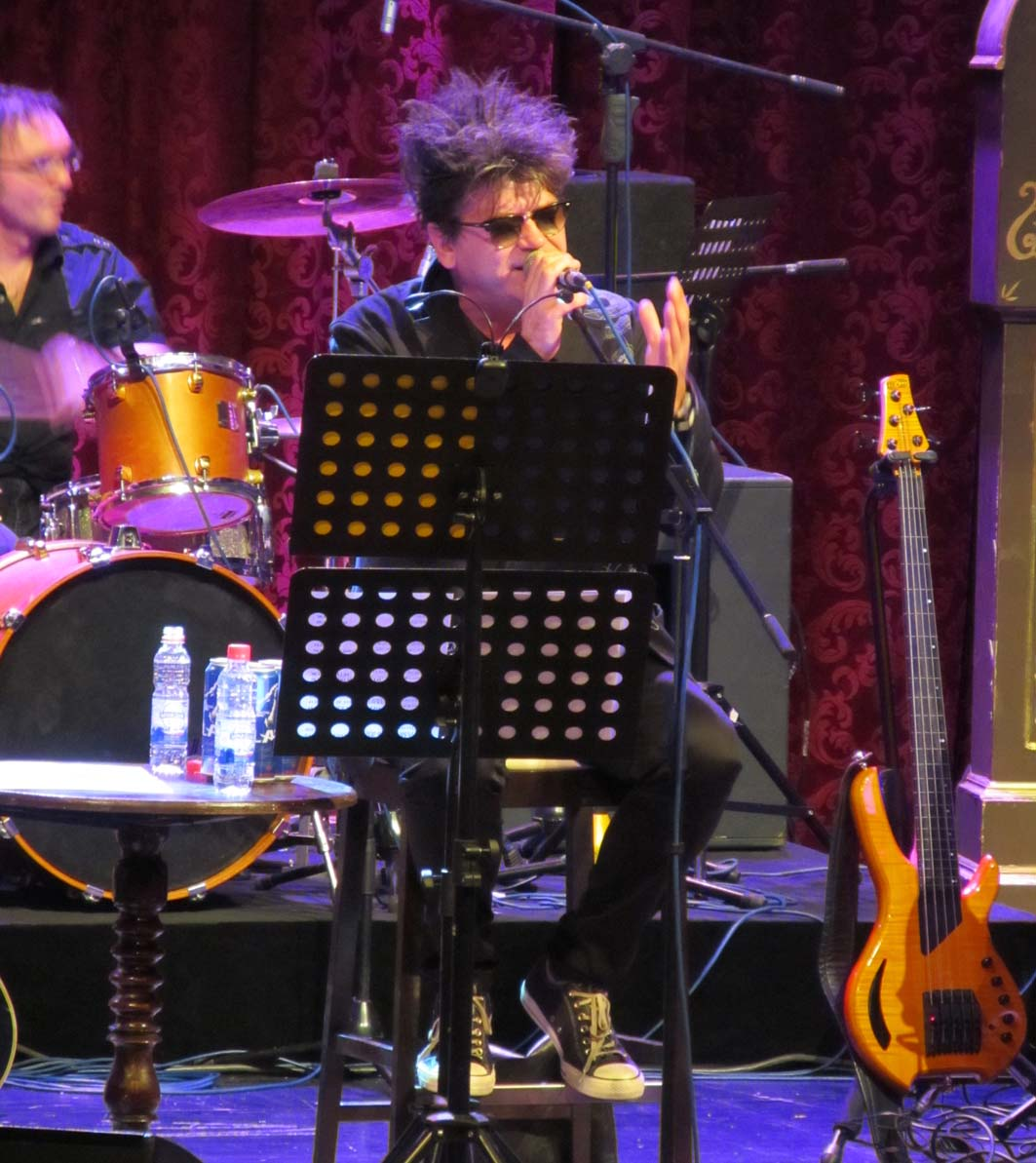
Dražen Žerić performing with Crvena Jabuka in 2014

The band marked their 30th anniversary with the double live album Bivše djevojčice, bivši dječaci – Unplugged live u Lisinskom (Former Girls, Former Boys – Unplugged Live in Lisinski), recorded on their concert held in Vatroslav Lisinski Concert Hall in Zagreb on 18 February 2014. The concert featured numerous guests, including Saša Lošić, with whom Crvena Jabuka performed Plavi Orkestar's old hits "Bolje biti pijan nego star" ("Better to Be Drunk than Old") and "Suada", and Željko Bebek, with whom the band performed Bijelo Dugme's old hit "Ima neka tajna veza" ("There's Some Secret Connection"). On 29 September 2014, the band's former guitarist Džimi Kurfirst—who had, after leaving Crvena Jabuka, recorded two instrumental albums— died following a long illness.

In 2016, the band released the double studio album 2016. The songs for the album were written by Zlatan Fazlić, who also made a guest appearance in the song "Nostalgija", Dragomir Herendić of Zabranjeno Pušenje, and other authors, and the album featured guest appearances by Halid Bešlić, Croatian band Gustafi and klapa Puntamika.

=== Jelčić's departure, new releases (2017–present) ===
In July 2017, Jelčić left Crvena Jabuka, leaving Žerić as the sole remaining original member of the band, stating that Žerić ousted him from the group. He would later state that he left the band out of financial disagreements with Žerić and that he was dissatisfied with Žerić's decision to turn to more folk-oriented sound. Žerić himself refused to comment on Jelčić's statements. Adrian Borić, drummer for the hard rock band Divlje Jagode, stepped in as the replacement for Jelčić. Jelčić would continued his career as the leader of his band Cunja Crvena Jabuka, formed in 2023, based in Toronto, Canada and performing only Crvena Jabuka songs from the 1985–1991 period.

In 2019, Crvena Jabuka released the album Nokturno (Nocturne), with most of the album songs authored by Mirko Šenkovski "Geronimo". The song "Grade moj" ("(Oh,) My City") was dedicated to deceased Kemal Monteno. The album was followed by the 2020 compilation Sarajevo 1985. – 2020., dedicated to the city of Sarajevo and featuring, alongside old songs, three new tracks, "Rano moja" ("(Oh,) My Misfortune"), "Ja još dišem" ("I'm Still Breathing") and "Kad s tobom nema me" ("When I'm Not There with You"). During the same year, the band released their seventeenth studio album Tvrđava (Fortress). The album featured Žerić's duet with singer Željko Samardžić "Aleje ljubavi" ("Alleyways of Love"). Actor Josip Pejaković made a guest appearance in the song "Moj brate" ("My Brother"), written by himself in 1984. The song "Nebesko platno" ("The Sky Canvas") was dedicated to designer and the band's long-time collaborator Davor Papić, who had died in a car accident in Netherlands on 9 April 2017. In December 2021, in Sarajevo's Štrosmajer Street an exhibit about the band was opened, authored by Amina Abdičević and entitled Crvena Jabuka: Za sve ove godine.

In 2022, Crvena Jabuka released their latest studio album, entitled Neka nova jutra (Some New Mornings). The album was recorded with new guitarist Dragan Todorović. The title track featured actor Mirsad Ibišević reciting Tin Ujević's poem "Vječni prsten" ("Eternal Ring"). The album also brought a cover of Novi Fosili song "Tonka". In 2024, the band released their latest album Mirišu jabuke (The Smell of Apples Is in the Air). Most of the album songs featured lyrics by Dragana Kajtazović-Šenkovski and were composed by Mirko Šenkovski "Geronimo", who also co-produced the album with Žerić. Alongside new songs, the album also features a cover of Alen Slavica song "Dao sam ti dušu" ("I Gave You My Soul").

== Legacy ==
Crvena Jabuka song "Nekako s proljeća" was covered in 1999 by Serbian pop singer Zorana Pavić on her album Nežno & opasno (Gentle & Dangerous), with actors Dragan Bjelogrlić and Nikola Kojo making guest appearances on her version. The band's song "Ostani" ("Stay") was covered in 2005 by Bosnian pop singer Selma Muhedinović on her album Moje Sarajevo (My Sarajevo).

In 2000, Crvena Jabuka song "Sa tvojih usana" was polled No.90 on the Rock Express Top 100 Yugoslav Rock Songs of All Times list.

The lyrics of the songs "Za sve ove godine" and "Ima nešto od srca do srca", both authored by Arslanagić, were featured in Petar Janjatović's book Pesme bratstva, detinjstva & potomstva: Antologija ex YU rok poezije 1967 - 2007 (Songs of Brotherhood, Childhood & Offspring: Anthology of Ex YU Rock Poetry 1967 – 2007).

The Dražen Ričl Award is awarded to young composers by the Association of Composers and Music Creators of Bosnia and Herzegovina.

== Band members ==
=== Lineups ===
April 1985-18 September 1986	Dražen Ričl - lead guitar, vocals; Zlatko Arslanagić - rhythm guitar; Aljoša Buha - bass guitar; Darko Jelčić - drums; Dražen Žerić - keyboards, backing vocals, synthesizers
1987	Dražen Žerić - harmonica/accordion, recorder, keyboards, singer/lead vocals; Zlatko Arslanagić - acoustic guitar, electric guitar, bass guitar, percussion, vocals; Darko Jelčić - drums, percussion
late 1987-1988	Dražen Žerić - vocals; Zlatko Arslanagić - lead guitar, rhythm guitar, vocals; Srđan Šerbedžija - bass guitar; Zlatko Volarević - keyboards; Darko Jelčić - drums, percussion
1988-1989	Dražen Žerić - vocals, (keyboards in studio); Zlatko Arslanagić - rhythm guitar; Srđan Šerbedžija - bass guitar; Zlatko Volarević - keyboards; Nikša Bratoš - lead guitar, mandolin, saxophone, melodica, vocals; Darko Jelčić - percussion, drums
1989-1990	Dražen Žerić Žera - vocals; Zlatko Arslanagić Zlaja - rhythm guitar; Branko Sauka Bane - bass guitar; Zlatko Volarević Dilajla - keyboards; Nikša Bratoš - lead guitar, mandolin, saxophone, melodica, vocals; Darko Jelčić Cunja - drums, percussion
1990	Dražen Žerić Žera - vocals; Zlatko Arslanagić Zlaja - rhythm guitar, vocals; Branko Sauka Bane - bass guitar; Zlatko Volarević Dilajla - keyboards; Igor Ivanović - lead guitar; Darko Jelčić Cunja - drums, percussion
1991	Dražen Žerić Žera - vocals; Zlatko Arslanagić Zlaja - rhythm guitar, percussion; Branko Sauka Bane - bass guitar; Zlatko Volarević Dilajla - keyboards; Zoran Šerbedžija Zoka - lead guitar; Nikša Bratoš - lead guitar, rhythm guitar, mandolin, saxophone, melodica, percussion, vocals; Darko Jelčić Cunja - drums, percussion
1991-1994	Hiatus
1994-1996	Dražen Žerić Žera - vocals; Mario Vukušić Jimmi - lead guitar; Krešimir Kaštelan Krešo - bass guitar; Nikša Bratoš - rhythm guitar, harmonica/accordion, clarinet, percussion, vocals; Darko Jelčić Cunja - drums; Danijel Lastrić - keyboards, vocals
1996-1998	Dražen Žerić Žera - vocals; Saša Zalepugin - lead guitar; Krešimir Kaštelan Krešo - bass guitar; Darko Jelčić Cunja - drums; Nikša Bratoš - rhythm guitar, harmonica, clarinet, saxophone, violin, vocals, percussion; Danijel Lastrić - keyboards
1997-2000	Dražen Žerić Žera - vocals; Zlatko Bebek - lead guitar; Krešimir Kaštelan Krešo - bass guitar; Darko Jelčić Cunja - drums, percussion; Nikša Bratoš - guitar, vocals, clarinet, violin, mandolin, percussion; Danijel Lastrić - keyboards
2000-2005	Dražen Žerić Žera - vocals; Damir Gonz - lead guitar; Krešimir Kaštelan Krešo - bass guitar; Darko Jelčić Cunja - drums, percussion; Nikša Bratoš - guitar, harmonica, clarinet, mandolin, percussion, vocals; Josip Andrić - keyboards
2005	Dražen Žerić Žera - vocals; Damir Gonz - lead guitar; Krešimir Kaštelan Krešo - bass guitar; Darko Jelčić Cunja - drums, percussion; Nikša Bratoš - guitar, percussion, mandolin, violin, vocals; Marko Belošević - keyboards
2007	Dražen Žerić Žera - vocals; Damir Gonz - lead guitar, percussion, vocals; Krešimir Kaštelan Krešo - bass guitar; Darko Jelčić Cunja - drums
2012-2017	Dražen Žerić Žera - vocals; Tomislav Skrak - lead guitar; Krešimir Kaštelan Krešo - bass guitar; Darko Jelčić Cunja - drums, percussion; Igor Matković - keyboards
2017–Present	Dražen Žerić Žera - vocals; Tomislav Skrak - lead guitar; Krešimir Kaštelan Krešo - bass guitar; Adrian Borić - drums, percussion; Igor Matković - keyboards

== Discography ==
=== Studio albums ===
- Crvena Jabuka (1986)
- Za sve ove godine (1987)
- Sanjati (1988)
- Tamo gdje ljubav počinje (1989)
- Nekako s proljeća (1991)
- U tvojim očima (1996)
- Svijet je lopta šarena (1997)
- Sve što sanjam (2000)
- Tvojim željama vođen (2002)
- Oprosti što je ljubavna (2005)
- ...Duša Sarajeva (2007)
- Volim te (2009)
- Za tvoju ljubav (2011)
- Nek' bude ljubav (2013)
- 2016 (2016)
- Nocturno (2018)
- Tvrđava (2020)
- Neka nova jutra (2022)
- Mirišu jabuke (2024)

=== Live albums ===
- Uzmi me (kad hoćeš ti) (1990)
- Riznice sjećanja (1999)
- Live (2001)
- Bivše djevojčice, bivši dječaci – Unplugged live u Lisinskom (2014)

=== Compilations ===
- Ima nešto od srca do srca (1993)
- Moje najmilije (1996)
- Antologija (2003)
- Zlatna kolekcija (2005)
- The Ultimate Collection (2008)
- Da nije ljubavi (2010)
- Najlepše ljubavne pjesme (2010)
- Christmas Limited Edition (2017)
- ''Sarajevo 1985. – 2020. (2020)

=== Box sets ===
- Original Album Collection (2013)
- 100 originalnih pjesama (2015)

=== Video albums ===
- S druge strane sjećanja (2010)

== See also ==
- New Primitives
