= Aljoša Buha =

Bosnian musician

Background information
- Born: 4 January 1962; Ljubljana, PR Slovenia, FPR Yugoslavia
- Died: 18 September 1986 (aged 24) Jablanica, SR Bosnia and Herzegovina, SFR Yugoslavia
- Genres: Rock; new wave; pop rock; power pop
- Instrument: Bass guitar
- Years active: 1979–1986
- Formerly of: Kongres; Crvena Jabuka

Aljoša Buha (Serbian Cyrillic: Аљоша Буха; 4 January 1962 – 18 September 1986) was a Yugoslav rock musician, known as the member of the bands Kongres and Crvena Jabuka.

Buha rose to prominence as the bassist of Kongres, participating in the recording of their only album—1984's Zarjavele trobente. In 1985, he joined Crvena Jabuka that gained immediate nationwide popularity in Yugoslavia with their 1986 self-titled debut album. On 18 September 1986, while on their way to a concert in Mostar, band members were involved in a car accident which killed Buha and Crvena Jabuka frontman Dražen Ričl.

== Early life and education ==
Buha was born in Ljubljana to a Herzegovinian Serb father Krsto Buha from the village of Balabani near Gacko and Slovenian mother Vida Tribušon from Nova Gorica. His parents had met and married in Ljubljana, where his father had arrived for metallurgy studies at the University of Ljubljana. Shortly after Aljoša's birth, as his father landed a job at Zenica Ironworks, the family moved to Zenica.

Growing up in Zenica's Pišće neighbourhood, Buha was musically inclined from a young age. With his friend and neighbour from the same apartment building Darko "Cunja" Jelčić, the youngster played in a band called Flota (Fleet).

Buha's mother died in March 1980 when Buha was eighteen. After graduating high school in Zenica and going off to serve his mandatory Yugoslav People's Army military stint, Buha went to Sarajevo for university studies, enrolling at the University of Sarajevo's Faculty of Philosophy. In the meantime, his widowed father re-married and Buha's half-sister Lidija was born in 1982. While pursuing his studies at the University Sarajevo, Buha was roommates with Haris Burina, a student at the Academy of Performing Arts, who had also arrived in Sarajevo from Zenica.

== Musical career ==
=== Kongres (1982–1985) ===
In 1982, twenty-year-old humanities university student Buha started playing bass in the newly-founded Sarajevo-based new wave / art pop / synth-pop band Kongres. Formed and run by drummer Adam Subašić, the band also featured vocalist and guitarist Mahir Purivatra, keyboardist Dado Džihan, and second vocalist Emir Cerić. Playing on the Sarajevo club scene during the 1982-1983 period, the band often crossed paths with Zabranjeno Pušenje and Elvis J. Kurtović & His Meteors, two more local young bands behind the nascent New Primitive club scene/movement in the city. However, since Kongres' sound and visual sensibility didn't overlap much with New Primitivism, the association always remained a cursory one.

Throughout the summer of 1984, the band recorded their debut album Zarjavele trobente (Rusty Trumpets) in RTV Sarajevo's studio. Produced by Mahmud "Paša" Ferović, the album was released by Diskoton in October 1984.

=== Crvena Jabuka (1985-1986) ===
In 1985, the same year Kongres disbanded, Buha was recruited into the newly-formed Crvena Jabuka. The band's original lineup also featured Dražen Ričl "Para" (vocals, guitar), Zlatko "Zlaja" Arslanagić (guitar), Dražen Žerić "Žera" (keyboards) and Darko "Cunja" Jelčić (drums). In May 1986, the group released their self-titled debut album. The album quickly gained immense popularity in Yugoslavia, with several songs becoming nationwide hits.

== Death ==
Following the release of Crvena Jabuka's debut album, the band held several promotional performances. In late summer 1986, the band booked the Bosnia-Herzegovina leg of a planned Yugoslavia-wide tour, the opening date of which was scheduled for Thursday, 18 September 1986 in Mostar at the Kantarevac Stadium. On the day of the concert, the band members and their small entourage left Sarajevo on their way to Mostar in three cars: vocalist and guitarist Ričl, guitarist Arslanagić, and bass guitarist Buha were in Arslanagić's Zastava 750, keyboardist Žerić and drummer Jelčić were in Žerić's Volkswagen Golf Mk1, while employees of the Zenica-based Atlas company, the organizers of the tour, were in a Zastava 1500. On a single-lane bidirectional road next to the Neretva river near the town of Jablanica, the Zastava 750 driven by Arslanagić veered into oncoming traffic colliding head-on with a truck. Buha died on the spot due to severe injuries, while Arslanagić and Ričl were transferred to Mostar city hospital. During the following several days, Arslanagić managed to recover, while the condition of Ričl, who had suffered severe head injuries, got progressively worse. He was transferred to Military Medical Academy in Belgrade by helicopter, where he died on 1 October 1986. Buha was buried in his hometown of Zenica. The three surviving members of Crvena Jabuka decided to continue their activity, dedicating their next release, the 1987 album Za sve ove godine (For All These Years) to Ričl and Buha.

== Discography ==
=== With Kongres ===
==== Studio albums ====
- Zarjavele trobente (1984)

=== With Crvena Jabuka ===
==== Studio albums ====
- Crvena Jabuka (1986)
