= Sarena Lin =

- 林紹婷
- Born: 9 January 1971 (age 55); Taipei, Taiwan
- Education: Harvard University (BA); Yale University (MA, MBA)
- Occupation: Businessperson
- Children: 1

Sarena Lin (Chinese: 林紹婷; born 9 January 1971) is a Taiwanese-American businesswoman who is a member of the Management Board and Labor Director of Bayer, a DAX company based in Leverkusen.

== Early life and education ==
Lin graduated from Harvard University with a Bachelor of Arts (B.A.) in computer science and then completed graduate studies at Yale University, where she earned a Master of Arts (M.A.) in international relations and a Master of Business Administration (M.B.A.) from the Yale School of Management.

== Career ==
Lin's professional career began in 1998 at McKinsey as Managing Partner in Taipei and manager in New York City. In 2011, served as corporate vice president of strategy and business development and president of feed and nutrition at Cargill in Minneapolis, leaving the company in 2017. In 2018, Lin moved to Elanco Animal Health Incorporated, where she served, among other things, as a member of the Executive Committee dealing with Transformation and Technology.

Lin has been a member of the Bayer Board of Management since February 2021. After Erica Mann, who left the company in 2018, she is only the second woman on the Management Board in the company's history. She also took over the position of labor director that CEO Werner Baumann previously held, making her the HR manager for 100,000 employees. In her new position, she has to implement the reduction of around 12,000 jobs that the group announced in 2020.

== Personal life ==
Lin has Taiwanese and American citizenship. She is married to a German man and has one daughter.
