= Tamo gdje ljubav počinje =

Studio album by Crvena Jabuka
- Released: March 30, 1989
- Recorded: February – March 1989
- Studio: Rockoko Studio, Bošnjaci
- Genre: Pop rock
- Label: Jugoton
- Producer: Nikša Bratoš

Crvena Jabuka chronology
| Sanjati (1988) | Tamo gdje ljubav počinje (1989) | Uzmi me (kad hoćeš ti) (1990) |

Tamo gdje ljubav počinje is the fourth studio album from the Sarajevo-based Bosnian pop rock band Crvena Jabuka, released in 1989.

This album is mostly centered on love songs, and had six singles. After the release of this album there was a tour that lasted to near the start of 1990. The most significant concert was at the Zagreb Sports Arena, where Crvena Jabuka recorded their first live album Uzmi me (kad hoćeš ti).

This album features the band in its concert lineup at that time, and it was the first album to be produced by Nikša Bratoš.

== Track listing ==
All songs are written by Zlatko Arslanagić:

1. To mi radi
2. Tuga ti i ja
3. Nek' vrijeme mijenja se
4. Volio bih da si tu
5. Šetajući daljinama
6. Čarolija (kad prestane)
7. Riznice sjećanja
8. Ostani
9. Na oluje navikli smo
10. Ne dam da ovaj osjećaj ode
11. Ples nevjernih godina
12. Tamo gdje ljubav počinje

== Personnel ==
- Darko Jelčić: drums, percussion
- Dražen Žerić: main vocals
- Zlatko Arslanagić: rhythm guitar
- Zlatko Volarević: piano
- Branko Salka: bass guitar
- Nikša Bratoš: guitar, horn arrangements on 6
