= Oprosti što je ljubavna =

Studio album by Crvena jabuka
- Released: 2005
- Genre: Pop

Crvena jabuka chronology
| Tvojim željama vođen (2002) | Oprosti što je ljubavna (2005) | Duša Sarajeva (2007) |

Oprosti što je ljubavna is the tenth studio album by the Sarajevo based pop group Crvena jabuka. This album was officially released in 2005.

With the release of this album, Crvena jabuka's popularity started to go downhill. On 6 April that year the band celebrated their 20th Anniversary at the Skenderija Hall.

On this album, there is a guest appearance by singer and songwriter Arsen Dedić.

== Track listing ==
1. Ti mi dusu Uzimas
2. Ako me pitas Kamarade
3. Esma
4. Znam
5. 11-ta Bozija Zapovjed
6. Cetkica za Zube
7. Dobro Neka Svira
8. Bolujem
9. Osjecaj
10. Oprosti sto je Ljubavna Pjesma
11. Dva i Dva(i Ona Mala Barka)
12. Zarjevele Trobente
13. Tugo Nesreco (bonus track)

== Personnel ==
- Darko Jelcic: drums, percussion
- Marko Belosevic: keyboards
- Kresmir Krestenac: bass
- Dražen Žerić: vocals
- Damir Gnoz: guitar
- Nikša Bratoš: guitar, violin, mandolin, keyboards, synthesizer, other programming, producer
- Arsen Dedić: vocals (track 4)
- Tarik Filipovic: vocals (track 5)
