= Dražen Ričl =

Bosnian rock musician (1962–1986)

- Ričl in 1986

Background information
- Also known as: Zijo, Para
- Born: 12 March 1962; Sarajevo, PR Bosnia and Herzegovina, FPR Yugoslavia
- Died: 1 October 1986 (aged 24) Belgrade, SR Serbia, SFR Yugoslavia
- Genres: Rock; power pop; pop rock
- Instruments: Guitar, vocals
- Years active: 1981–1986
- Formerly of: Elvis J. Kurtović & His Meteors; Crvena Jabuka

Dražen Ričl, known under nicknames "Zijo" and "Para", (12 March 1962 – 1 October 1986) was a Bosnian rock musician, best known as the original frontman of popular pop rock band Crvena Jabuka.

Ričl started his musical activity in his hometown Sarajevo in the early 1980s. He rose to prominence as guitarist for the band Elvis J. Kurtović & His Meteors and participant in the New Primitivism subcultural movement. He gained nationwide popularity in Yugoslavia as the vocalist and guitarist of Crvena Jabuka, which he formed in 1985 with guitarist Zlatko Arslanagić, along with keyboardist Dražen Žerić, bassist Aljoša Buha, and drummer Darko Jelčić. The band's 1986 self-titled debut album was an instant commercial success. On 18 September 1986, while on their way to Mostar for their first solo concert on the album promotional tour, the band members were involved in a car accident which killed Aljoša Buha. Ričl was transferred to the Mostar city hospital with severe head injuries. Several days later he was transferred to the Military Medical Academy (VMA) in Belgrade, where he died.

== Early life ==
Ričl was born in Sarajevo to Czech father Ferdinand Ritchel and Bosniak mother Elvira Deak. He grew up in Sarajevo's Višnjik neighborhood, where he was known by the nickname "Para".

In parallel with primary school, he attended lower music school for acoustic guitar. Already infatuated with the 1970s British and American hard rock, in parallel with his secondary education at Sarajevo's Druga Gimnazija, the teenager started a short-lived band Misterija (Mystery). Later during high school, he switched over to play with Znak Sreće (Sign of Happiness). Upon graduating high school, he enrolled in the journalism program at the University of Sarajevo's Faculty of Political Sciences, where he would later meet future fellow musician Branko Đurić, but, for the time being in September 1980, immediately went to serve his mandatory Yugoslav People's Army stint.

== Career ==
=== Early years (1981–1983) ===
In September 1981, upon returning home from the army, Ričl reclaimed his spot with Znak Sreće that had in the meantime been reconfigured as Žaoka (Sting). With Žaoka, Ričl appeared at the Mladost Sutjeske (Youth of Sutjeska) event at Skenderija sports arena in early October 1981; commemorating and celebrating the Partisan guerrillas involvement at the Battle of Sutjeska from World War II, the show featured a number of up-and-coming Sarajevo-based rock bands.

Simultaneously, from fall 1981, he became involved with the Top lista nadrealista segment on Radio Sarajevo's Primus weekly program, joining Nele Karajlić, Zenit Đozić, Zlatko Arslanagić, and Boris Šiber who had been performing comedy sketches on radio for some 6 months already. Already on the rise in terms of local popularity, the unscripted sketches continued doing well with the Sarajevo youth, their target audience. As the only formally trained musician among this group of self-taught radio sketch comedy protagonists, in addition to doing comedy, Ričl additionally often provided musical support on guitar in the sketches.

By the end of 1981, he switched over to Ozbiljno Pitanje (Serious Question), a power pop band featuring Zlatko Arslanagić. Already sporadically attending his university studies, Ričl would soon abandon them altogether in pursuit of a musical career.

=== Elvis J. Kurtović & His Meteors (1983–1985) ===
In 1983, Ričl joined Elvis J. Kurtović & His Meteors, a band associated with the nascent New Primitivism movement in the city of Sarajevo. As part of the New Primitives, he assumed the nickname/stagename "Zijo" and took part in the recording of the band's 1984 debut album Mitovi i legende o kralju Elvisu (Myths and Legends about King Elvis). Simultaneously, Top lista nadrealista expanded to television, and Ričl continued as one of the troupe's leading performers; in early June 1984, the show premiered on Television Sarajevo locally while simultaneously being shown in the rest of Yugoslavia through JRT exchange, garnering decent reviews and high viewership.

Ričl also performed on the Elvis J. Kurtović & His Meteors' 1985 album Da Bog da crk'o rok'n'rol (May Rock 'n' Roll Drop Dead) before leaving the band. His last performance with them took place in mid-June 1985 at the YU Rock Misija open-air concert at Belgrade's Red Star Stadium.

=== Crvena Jabuka (1985–1986) ===
By early 1985, Ričl began re-connecting with Arslanagić musically, with a view of possibly launching a new band with his former musical collaborator. Within months, upon his formal departure from Elvis J. Kurtović & His Meteors in June 1985, Ričl devoted himself fully to working with Arslanagić again. The Ričl-Arslanagić project was soon unveiled, a band named Crvena Jabuka with the rest of the lineup consisting of keyboardist Dražen "Žera" Žerić, drummer Darko "Cunja" Jelčić, and bassist Aljoša Buha. Even before releasing any material, the new band began receiving press coverage in Yugoslavia and soon secured a contract with the country's biggest record label, Jugoton.

In March 1986, the group released their self-titled debut album, featuring pop rock songs authored by Arslanagić and Ričl, The material has numerous lyrical and musical references to the 1960s British scene: from the song "Bivše djevojčice, bivši dječaci" ("Former Girls, Former Boys") featuring the translated verse "I volio bi' umrijeti prije nego ostarim" from The Who's "My Generation" ("I hope I die before I get old") to other songs containing riffs lifted straight from Slade, Sweet, and the Rolling Stones. The album quickly became popular in Yugoslavia, eventually reaching a highly-respectable 150,000 copies sold, with several songs becoming nationwide hits.

Promoting the album, Crvena Jabuka held several live performances—including being booked for the Maj Rok single-day open-air festival at the Marx-Engels Square in Belgrade celebrating late Marshal Tito's birthday, an official holiday in communist Yugoslavia known as the Youth Day. The festival had originally been scheduled for 24 May 1986 (the closest Saturday to the 25 May holiday), beginning that day with 100,000 spectators gathered at the square before getting interrupted due to an extended torrential downpour and flash flooding. Crvena Jabuka still got to play on the rescheduled date for the event three months later, in early September 1986, when it rained again though not as heavily so the show went ahead as planned.

== Death ==
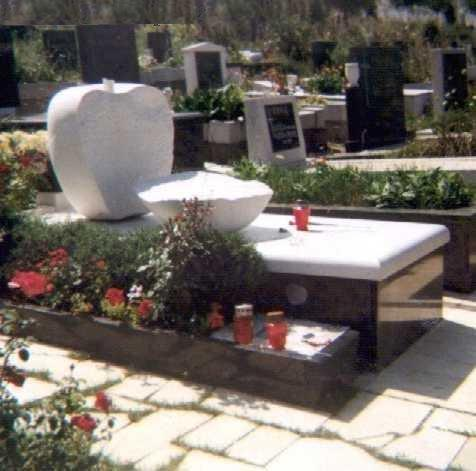
Ričl's grave at Bare Cemetery with apple-shaped tombstone, in reference to the name of his band Crvena Jabuka (Red Apple)

In late summer 1986, as a consequence of the outstanding sales of Crvena Jabuka's debut album, the band booked the Bosnia-Herzegovina leg of a planned Yugoslavia-wide tour, the opening date of which was scheduled for Thursday, 18 September 1986 in Mostar at the Kantarevac Stadium.

On the day of the concert, the band members and their small entourage left Sarajevo on their way to Mostar in three cars: vocalist and guitarist Ričl, guitarist Arslanagić, and bass guitarist Buha were in Arslanagić's Zastava 750, keyboardist Žerić and drummer Jelčić were in Žerić's Volkswagen Golf Mk1, while employees of the Zenica-based Atlas company, the organizers of the tour, were in a Zastava 1500. On a single-lane bidirectional road next to the Neretva river near the town of Jablanica, the Zastava 750 driven by Arslanagić veered into oncoming traffic colliding head-on with a truck. Buha died on the spot due to severe injuries, while Arslanagić and Ričl were transferred to the Mostar City Hospital, where—once the word of what happened got out—hundreds of local young people began gathering in front of the hospital offering to donate blood. Over the subsequent days, Arslanagić managed to recover, while the condition of Ričl, who had suffered severe head injuries, got progressively worse. He was transferred to the Military Medical Academy in Belgrade by helicopter, but the academy's staff could do little to help. He died on 1 October 1986, aged 24. He was buried in the Bare Cemetery in Sarajevo. The three surviving members of Crvena Jabuka decided to continue the band's activity, dedicating their next release, the 1987 album Za sve ove godine (For All These Years) to Ričl and Buha.

== Personal life ==
During 1983, Ričl was reportedly romantically involved with Videosex vocalist Anja Rupel.

== Legacy ==
In 2000, Crvena Jabuka song "Sa tvojih usana" from the band's debut album was polled No.90 on the Rock Express Top 100 Yugoslav Rock Songs of All Times list.

The Dražen Ričl Award is awarded to young composer by the Association of Composers and Music Creators of Bosnia and Herzegovina.

== Discography ==
=== With Elvis J. Kurtović & His Meteors ===
==== Studio albums ====
- Mitovi i legende o kralju Elvisu (1984)
- Da Bog da crk'o rok'n'rol (1985)

=== With Crvena Jabuka ===
==== Studio albums ====
- Crvena Jabuka (1986)
