= Elvis J. Kurtović & His Meteors =

Yugoslav punk rock band

- Origin: Sarajevo, SR Bosnia and Herzegovina, Yugoslavia
- Genres: Punk rock; New Primitivism
- Years active: 1981–1991
- Labels: ZKP RTLJ; Diskoton; TLN-Europa; Nimfa Sound
- Past members: Sejo Sexon; Dražen Ričl; Rizo; Elvis J. Kurtović; Hare; Fićo; Zlaja; Poka; Seid Karajlić; Garo; Kriza; Saša Strunjaš; Jure Paunović

Elvis J. Kurtović & His Meteors was a Yugoslav punk rock band formed in Sarajevo, Yugoslavia in 1981. The band was the product of the New Primitivism movement, and its founder and leader was Elvis J. Kurtović. The band disbanded following the disintegration of Yugoslavia.

The group was founded in 1981 by Mirko Srdić “Elvis J. Kurtović”, Davor Sučić “Sejo Sexon” and Dražen Janković “Seid Karajlić”. Zabranjeno pušenje made a pause due to the departure of most of the members to the army. They are soon joined by guitarist Dražen Ričl “Zijo”, drummer Radomir Gavrilović “Hare” and singer Goran Petranović “Rizo” and the group starts with frenzied concerts, and then recording material for the first album, which was a great success and gave them a status as a cult Bosnian and Yugoslav group. Elvis had the role of songwriter and ideological leader in the group, he actively participated in that and later all future concerts he would participate by standing on the stage and strumming an untuned guitar, and occasionally taking the microphone in his hands. Soon after the return of the members of Zabranjeno pušenje from the army, Sejo Sexon leaves the group, but the collaboration between Sejo, Elvis and other members will continue through joint writing of texts, guest appearances at concerts and albums, and through the project “Top lista nadrealista" (Top List of Surrealists).

== History ==
=== First album ===
The first album entitled "Mitovi i legende o kralju Elvisu” (Myths and legends about king Elvis) was recorded in the studio "Akvarijus", produced by Elvis, Raka Marić and Goran Vejvoda and released in 1984, for RTV Ljubljana. The album was made in the Monty Python/New Primitives spirit - as a "thematic radio show" dedicated to "najvećoj zvijezdi R’n’R-a, g. Elvisu J. Kurtoviću” (the biggest star of R'n'R, Mr. Elvis J. Kurtović"), whose songs (mainly covers of songs by iconic world rock bands and have more satirical than musical value), interspersed with the reading of Elvis' "biography", follow the alleged musical development of the "rock legend". The most important songs from this album are the cover of "Honky Tonk Woman" (The Rolling Stones) called "Baščaršy Hanumen", the song "Kad se babo vrati kući pijan", the cover of the song "Pinball Wizard" by The Who called "Ćiza-vizard", and "Folk Raping", a disco song in which Elvis introduces the members of his group. All the songs on the album were written by Sejo Sexon and Elvis J. Kurtović. An interesting and little-known fact related to "Myths and legends about King Elvis" is the appearance of Margita Stefanović (from the group Ekatarina Velika) at the keyboards.

=== First line-up and second album ===
The line-up of the first and second album consisted of:

- Goran Petranović (Rizo) – vocals,
- Dražen Ričl (Zijo) - guitar,
- Radomir Gavrilović (Hare) - drums,
- Nermin Dedić (Fićo) - bass,
- Zoran Degan (Poka) - keyboards,
- Mirko Srdić (Elvis. J. Kurtović) – extra, occasional vocalist

In the same line-up and under the same publishing house, in 1985, and produced by Boris Bele, the group released their second LP "Da bog da crk'o rok'n'rol". Guests on the album were keyboardist Borut Činč (Buldožer) and singer Anja Rupel (Videosex).

The title song, also the album's biggest hit, is also a Rolling Stones cover ("It's Only Rock'n'Roll"). Other hits from the album were: "Ljubav je jaka", "Surfing at Bembasha", and "Ćerka jedinica", which was later included on the album of the last baby of the New Primitives, Bombaj štampa.

== Third album and final line-up ==
After the departure of Dražen Ričl “Zijo”, who with Zlatko Arslanagić “Zlaja” founded the group Crvena jabuka, the group took a three-year long break.

=== Third album ===
In a new line-up, but again under the same publishing house, the group released its third album in 1988 - "Čudesan svet privatluka/The Wonderful World of Private Business". The album was produced by Zoran Redžić (Bijelo Dugme) and Mustafa Čengić (Zabranjeno pušenje). As a guest on this album, in the song “E.J.K. Rapping", appears Nenad Janković (dr. Nele Karajlić from the group Zabranjeno pušenje). Created during the transition from one social system to another, the entire album, especially the title and cover, represents a parody of the emergence of a new social category - private entrepreneurs. This album, as the most mature achievement of Elvis J. Kurtović and his Meteors, brings the most original music, as well as phenomenal lyrics that, again, now with a recognizable dose of humor, touch on love, cultural and social themes and problems of the then (and now) society. There are songs "Šta da radi insan", "Zašto ljubav boli", "Haile Selasije", "Vrati mi ljubav", "Onaj sa ekrana", and "Njene divne oči". The authors of most of the texts are Elvis J. Kurtović and Zoran Degan “Poka”.

The album was made in the lineup:

- Goran Petranović (Rizo) – vocals,
- Sergej Kreso (Garo) – drums,
- Jure Paunović – keyboards,
- Zvonimir Matić (Kriza) – bass,
- Saša Strunjaš – guitar,
- Mirko Srdić (Elvis J. Kurtović) – extra, occasional vocalist

== Name of the group ==
=== How the group came up with the name ===
When Mirko Srdić i.e. Elvis J. Kurtović founded the band, Jasmin Kurtović, a great fan of Rock'n'Roll, lived in the neighborhood. When Jasmin got married and had a son, he immediately named him Elvis, which the band members immediately took as a joke that he named him after the legendary Elvis Presley. So they named their nameless composition "Elvis Jasmina Kurtović". After that, Jasmin Kurtović sued them and the court forbade the use of that name, however they no longer spelled it as Jasmina, but used the letter "J" (misspelled as dži instead of džej), so that it would not be associated with Jasmin. So Mirko Srdić became Elvis J. Kurtović, not only because of his nickname, but also because of his image and the popular sideburns that were an integral part of the image of Elvis Presley, and the Elvis of Sarajevo. After a few years, Jasmin moved from Koševo to the newly built Dobrinja, and Elvis J. Kurtović & His Meteors became popular throughout the country.

== Aggression against Bosnia and Herzegovina and the disbandment of the band ==
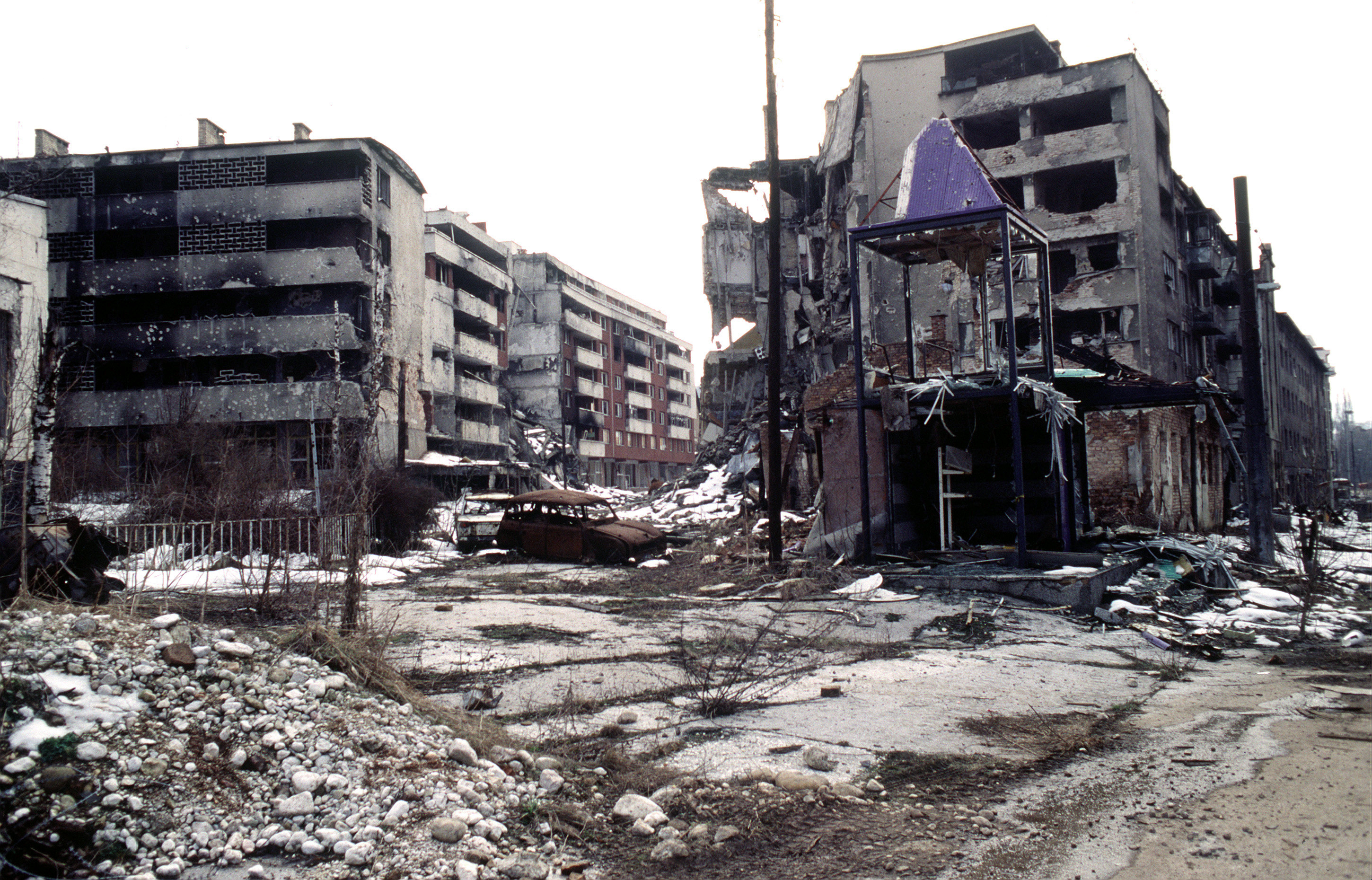
Damaged buildings in Grbavica during the Siege of Sarajevo

The aggression against Bosnia and Herzegovina led to the suspension of the band's work, and the death of keyboardist and songwriter Zoran Degan “Poka”. Goran Petranović “Rizo”, the band's singer, goes to Belgrade, while Elvis J. Kurtović stays in the besieged Sarajevo and, together with Sejo Sexon, Boris Šiber, Zenit Đozić and others, participates in the wartime “Top lista nadrealista.”

== After the war ==
After the war, Elvis J. Kurtović helped Sejo Sexon to restore the band Zabranjeno pušenje, which had also been torn apart by the war, and with them he recorded two albums in 1997, the album Fildžan viška, and in 1999, Agent tajne sile. In 2002, Elvis J. Kurtović recorded a solo album with Marin Gradac, the singer of Zabranjeno pušenje at the time, which was never officially released. The album is known under the names "To sam ja" or "Die neue bosnische Kunst", while Elvis called it "Za prijatelje i rodbinu". The most interesting songs from this album are "U modi je biti šupak", "Mala slatka rockerka", "Protestna pesma" and others.

=== Elvis Jr. Kurtović ===
After the war, the former singer of the group Goran Petranović “Rizo” recorded a compilation album in Belgrade in 2000 called “Welcome to the beautiful world of new primitives”, which included the new songs "Šleper", "Obren i Amela" and "Guru dedo", as well as a cover of the song "Yugo 45" from Zabranjeno pušenje. After a long break, Rizo recorded an album called "Koševo zove" in early 2011, but now under the new name of the band "Elvis Jr. Kurtović".

== Discography ==
=== Studio albums ===
- Mitovi i legende o kralju Elvisu (1984)
- Da bog da crk'o rok'n'rol (1985)
- The wonderful world of private business (1988)

==== Compilation albums ====
- Hitovi '83-'88 (1996)
- Najgori hitovi (1998)
