= Nekako s proljeća =

Studio album by Crvena jabuka
- Released: April 27, 1991
- Recorded: c. 1990–early 1991
- Studios: Rockoko Studio, Bošnjaci
- Genre: Pop rock
- Length: xx:yy
- Label: Jugoton
- Producer: Nikša Bratoš

Crvena jabuka chronology
Uzmi me (kad hoćeš ti) (1990)	Nekako s proljeća (1991)	Ima nešto od srca do srca (1993)

Nekako s proljeća is the fifth studio album by popular Yugoslav Sarajevo-based pop rock band Crvena jabuka. The album was released during 1991.

Nekako s proljeća's title track features a guest contribution from Kemal Monteno. This was the first time that the band had ever collaborated with another musician during their career.

The album was very successful, and the band was planning a major tour once again, but the Yugoslav wars moving into Croatia and Bosnia & Herzegovina halted plans. As a result of that, many concert dates had to be cancelled, and the band was starting to break loose. Rhythm guitarist Zlatko Arslanagić had to leave the band during the spring of 1992 when he went to London before coming to Toronto in the summer of 1995. The remainder of the band moved to Zagreb since the start of the war. Žerić opened a café in Sarajevo called "Broj Jedan" (#1).

A remaster was released in 2003 with all twelve tracks included on the original release plus two tracks that were previously omitted: "Sve što imaš ti", and Bacila je sve niz rijeku.

== Track listing ==
1. "Moje najmilije"
2. "Da nije ljubavi"
3. "Nekako s proljeća"
4. "Pusti neka gori"
5. "6:00"
6. "Sto pijanih noći"
7. "Da znaš da me boliš"
8. "Crvena Jabuka"
9. "Hajde dođi mi"
10. "Srce si mi slomila"
11. "Samo da me ne iznevjeriš ti"
12. "Nemoj da sudiš preostro o meni"
13. "Sve što imaš ti" (Remaster)
14. "Bacila je sve niz rijeku"(live) (Remaster)

== Personnel ==
- Dražen Žerić - vocals
- Zlatko Arslanagić - rhythm guitar, and backing vocals
- Branislav Sauka - bass, rhythm sections arrangement
- Darko Jelčić - drums, percussion
- Zlatko Volarević - keyboards, and backing vocals
- Kemal Monteno - guitar and vocals (Track 3)
- Nikša Bratoš - guitar, saxophone, flute, woodwinds, horn, trumpet, harmonica, percussion, keyboards, synthesizers, and backing vocals
