= Nikša Bratoš =

Croatian musician

- Born: August 17, 1959 (age 66); Travnik, PR Bosnia and Herzegovina, FPR Yugoslavia
- Genres: pop, rock
- Instrument: guitar
- Formerly of: Bonton Baya Crvena jabuka Valentino

Nikša Bratoš (born 17 August 1959) is a Croatian musician. He is known for having played in bands Bonton Baya, Valentino and Crvena jabuka. He has worked on songs for a variety of Croatian pop artists.

== Biography ==
Bratoš was born in 1959, and graduated from the University of Electronics in Sarajevo in 1985. He played guitar and sang backup vocals in Bonton Baya and then moved Valentino before transitioning into Crvena jabuka.

Bratoš first worked with Crvena jabuka as a producer. He was recruited to produce 1988's Sanjati, and then every subsequent album. Bratoš was later recruited as a member of the band. He is known for having played many different instruments. Generally he played rhythm guitar, but periodically harmonica, saxophone, mandolin, melodika, clarinet, and woodwinds and sometimes keyboards, synthesizers and singing backup vocals. Bratoš was able to add horn arrangements as well as other string instruments which the band became known for in the 1990s.

In 1990 Bratoš moved to Zagreb where he continued to be involved in music as a guitarist, producer, and keyboard player. In 1994 he became an official member of Crvena jabuka and since then has performed at all of their concerts and their albums. He was also responsible for the production and programming on each album.

He arranged the song "Metak sa posvetom" for Lepa Brena's 2011 album Začarani krug.

In July 2014, Bratoš was appointed president of the government-funded Croatian Music Union (HGU), succeeding Husein Hasanefendić at the post.

== Personal life ==
Bratoš has two sons, Goran and Marko. Son Marko works as a presenter at the radio station Narodni radio in Zagreb.

In late 2017, HGU president Bratoš filed a libel lawsuit against Croatia Records CEO Želimir Babogredac over his claims in a June 2015 Slobodna Dalmacija interview that "Bratoš and his HGU loyalists engaged in malfeasance via blackmail and collusion with Croatia's state-run broadcaster, HRT, for illegal monetary gain". At one of the trial dates, Crvena jabuka frontman Dražen Žerić was called to provide testimony. The verdict was delivered in 2018 with the court ruling in Bratoš's favour.
