= Dovitljivi mali čudaci =

EP by Haustor
- Released: June 1, 2017
- Recorded: 1990
- Genre: Pop; rock
- Length: 21:29
- Language: Croatian
- Label: Dancing Bear
- Producer: Davor Rocco

Haustor chronology
Greatest Hits Collection (2017)	Dovitljivi mali čudaci (2017)	Treći svijet (Soundtrack) (2025)

Dovitljivi mali čudaci (Witty Little Freaks) is an extended play (EP) by Croatian band Haustor. The EP was conceived as Haustor's fifth studio album, which was supposed to be released in the early 1990s, but was released in 2017 on the occasion of the reissue of Darko Rundek's digitally remastered album Apokalipso. As Rundek himself stated, Dovitljivi mali čudaci was never published because the band did not particularly like the material, so "even now he would not put his hands in the fire for those songs", referring to their arrangements, because "Ista slika" and "Señor" are part of the repertoire at almost every Rundek Cargo Trio concert. These two songs are the most interesting for the audience, because of the stories behind them, but also because of the altered lyrics in the case of the composition "Señor.

Album has been never finalized because of Haustor's breakup.

== Background ==
After release of Tajni grad (1988), Rundek was most often engaged in the realization of radio dramas and music for theatre. During 1989 and 1990, on the airwaves of Radio Zagreb (today Hrvatski Radio) the dramas Mission, a cycle of six dramas Horror-scene, Pirate's Snapshot, Euripides's The Phoenician Women and other were broadcast.

In TV show Hit Depo, he admitted that he had become a father and announced Dovitljivi mali čudaci.

== Album ==
The songs from 1990 were done in a slightly slower rhythm. In addition, it is interesting to notice the change in Rundek's voice through the songs "More more", "Hiawatha", "Señor". More than a decade later, in 2002, the audience followed this song with comments that Rundek brilliantly described the war events of the 90s by describing "joyful flies" and singing about "red drops that fell on white". The author himself did not speak about the inspiration for the text, so it is not even known whether in 1990 Rundek was singing about what was clear to many at the time, but from which they looked away - about the war and the bloodshed that will engulf the nations. However, Rundek published all the songs, except for "Disanje", in a somewhat different arrangement or with modified lyrics, years later, on the albums Apokalipso, U širokom svijetu and Ruke.

The song "Señor" was known to have been written for a never-released Haustor album, which Rundek also spoke about. "Ista slika" is on the album Ruke, and in the music video for it, the actor Sergej Trifunović appears in addition to the crew of the then Cargo Orchestra. What was little known until now is that this song was recorded in 1990, before the breakup of the group, but also of Yugoslavia at that time.

In 1992, original "Ista slika" appeared on compilation album Rock za Hrvatsku.

== Track listing ==
All tracks are written by Darko Rundek.

No.	Title	Length
1.	"Hiawatha"	4:18
2.	"Disanje"	3:10
3.	"Ista slika"	3:25
4.	"More more"	5:37
5.	"Señor"	4:59
Total length:		21:29
