= Metak =

Yugoslav Rock Band

Background information
- Origin: Split, SR Croatia SFR Yugoslavia
- Genres: Hard rock; power pop; new wave
- Years active: 1978–1981
- Labels: Diskoton, Jugoton, Suzy, Croatia Records
- Past members: Mirko Krstičević; Ranko Boban; Matko Jelavić; Željko Brodarić; Zlatko Brodarić; Doris Tomić

Metak (trans. Bullet) was a Yugoslav rock band formed in Split in 1978.

The group was formed on the initiative of bass guitarist Mirko Krstičević and poet and lyricist Momčilo Popadić. The first lineup of the band featured, beside Krstičević, vocalist and guitarist Ranko Boban and drummer Matko Jelavić, the three soon joined by guitarist Željko Brodarić "Jappa". After the departure of Boban, Brodarić took over the vocal duties, and the group was joined by two new members, Željko Brodarić's brother Zlatko (guitar) and Doris Tomić (keyboards). After releasing two studio albums and gaining significant popularity on the Yugoslav rock scene, the group disbanded in 1981, the members continuing their careers in other fields of music: Željko Brodarić as a solo artist and successful producer, Krstičević as a composer of film and theatre music, Zlatko Brodarić as a studio musician and performer of instrumental music, and Jelavić as a popular pop singer.

== History ==
=== 1978–1981 ===
The formation of Metak was initiated in the spring of 1978 by bass guitarist Mirko Krstičević (formerly of the band Che) and poet and journalist Momčilo Popadić. The first lineup of the band also featured Sarajevo-born vocalist and guitarist Ranko Boban (formerly of the groups Ajan and Vozdra) and drummer Matko Jelavić. The group was soon joined by guitarist Željko Brodarić "Jappa". Jappa had previously, at the age of eighteen, performed with the veteran band Delfini, and in 1976 he formed the band Put (Road) with his brother Zlatko and brothers Boro Vasić (bass guitar) and Milo Vasić (drums). Playing with other groups, the members of Metak had already gained significant experience, Boban had already achieved success as a songwriter—the songs he authored were recorded by popular acts like Zdravko Čolić, Seid Memić "Vajta", Biljana Petrović, Indexi and Cod—and Popadić had already published four books of poetry.

The band had their first live appearance at the 1978 Split Festival, on which they performed the song "Šijavica" ("Morra") and "Gastarbajterska balada" ("Gastarbeiter Ballad"), the two songs soon after appearing on a 7-inch single. As the festival organizers considered the name Metak too provocative, the group was announced as Meta (Target). In the autumn of 1978, Ranko Boban was, alongside drummer Ipe Ivandić and two other musicians who worked on Ivandić's album Stižemo, arrested for owing hashish and sentenced to a year in prison. Metak continued their activity without him, with Brodarić taking over the role of the band's vocalist and his brother Zlatko Brodarić (guitar) and Doris Tomić (keyboards) joining the group as the new members.

In 1979, the band released their first studio album, entitled U tetrapaku (In Tetrapak). The songs composed by Krstičević featured lyrics written by Momčilo Popadić, and the songs composed by Zlatko and Željko Brodarić featured lyrics written by the latter. The album brought energetic sound, with the songs "Tetrapak", "Miss Levi's (nema meni do Vinke)" ("Miss Levi's (Nobody But Vinka)"), and the ballads "Rock'n'roller" and "Htio sam noćas da ti pišem" ("I Wanted to Write to You Last Night") receiving large airplay. Following the album release, Metak performed as one of the opening bands on Bijelo Dugme's concert at JNA Stadium in Belgrade. In 1980, the group released the single "Da mi je biti morski pas" ("Wish I Were a Shark"), with lyrics written by Popadić, which would become Metak's biggest hit.

For the band's second studio album, entitled Ratatatatija, music was composed by Brodarić brothers and Krstičević, and the lyrics were written by Željko Brodarić and Popadić. The album featured slight change in musical style, the group moving away from their initial hard rock and power pop sound and joining on the exuberant Yugoslav new wave scene. After the recording sessions were finished, Željko Broadrić went to serve his mandatory stint in the Yugoslav People's Army, and the album was released in 1981 during his absence. It brought well-received songs "Split at Night", "On voli strip junake" ("He Likes Comic Book Heroes") and guitar instrumental "Bijela soba" ("White Room"). At the end of 1981, the band ended their activity.

=== Post breakup ===
Željko Brodarić would continue his career by releasing the solo album Majmuni (Monkeys) in 1982. The album featured the songs originally written for Metak's never-recorded third studio album. During the 1980s, he produced albums by prominent Yugoslav acts like Haustor, Regata, Animatori, D' Boys, Đavoli, Crvena Jabuka and others. After living in Italy and England during the 1990s, he returned to Split, starting his jazz fusion trio Jappa Band in 2008. Since 2016, he has been performing with his daughter Sara Brodarić Ševgić under the name Sara & Jappa.

Krstičević continued his career as a composer of film and theatre music.

Zlatko Brodarić continued as a studio musician. He has released six solo albums of instrumental music: Between Perpendiculars (2000), Going West Looking East (2002), It's Chemical (2004), Dalmacija na gitari (Dalmatia on Guitar, 2021), Acoustic Guitar Vol.1 (2022) and Acoustic Guitar Vol.2 (2022), the latter three released on Bandcamp. With his sons Gogi (drums) and Luka (bass guitar) he formed the band Dva Brata i Tata (Two Brothers and Dad).

Jelavić continued his career as a pop singer-songwriter, releasing a number of successful albums.

After Metak disbanded, Popadić continued to write lyrics for other artists, publishing one more book of poems and a book of autobiographical prose, essays and dramas. He died in Split on 20 November 1990. On 30 July 2005, a group of musicians from Split, including the Brodarić brothers, performed songs with Popadić's lyrics on a concert the recording of which was released on the album Čovik od soli 2 (Man Made of Salt 2) in 2006. The double compilation album Gold Collection, released by Croatia Records in 2017, features songs by various artists with lyrics written by Popadić. He was the subject of Toni Volarić's 2017 documentary film Pope, vrati se (Pop, Come Back).

In 2019, Croatia record released the five-piece box set Splitska djeca – od zidića do vječnosti (Children of Split - From Little Wall to Eternity), featuring a previously unreleased live version of "Da mi je biti morski pas".

== Legacy ==
The song "Da mi je biti morski pas" was covered by Croatian and Yugoslav hard rock band Osmi Putnik on their 1987 album Glasno, glasnije (Loud, Louder), by Serbian and Yugoslav funk rock band Deca Loših Muzičara, for Srđan Dragojević's 1994 film Dva sata kvalitetnog TV programa (Two Hours of Quality TV Program), and by Croatian rock band Lili Gee, for the 2023 White Shark campaign, dedicated to preservation of sharks. The 1999 film Wish I Were a Shark by Split director Ognjen Sviličić was inspired by the song. In 2006, the song was polled No.55 on the B92 Top 100 Yugoslav songs list.

The lyrics of the band's 1979 song "Nalazim nebo" ("I'm Finding the Sky"), authored by Željko Brodarić, are featured in Petar Janjatović's book Pesme bratstva, detinjstva & potomstva: Antologija ex YU rok poezije 1967 - 2007 (Songs of Brotherhood, Childhood & Offspring: Anthology of Ex YU Rock Poetry 1967 – 2007).

== Discography ==
=== Studio albums ===
- U tetrapaku (1979)
- Ratatatatija (1980)

=== Compilations ===
- Da mi je biti morski pas (1995)

=== Singles ===
- "Šijavica" / "Gastarbajterska balada" (1978)
- "Ona ima svoju dragu mamu" / "Revolver" (1979)
- "Da mi je biti morski pas" / "Rock'n'roller" (1980)
