= Uzmi me (kad hoćeš ti) =

Live album by Crvena jabuka
- Released: 1990
- Recorded: 1989
- Genres: New wave, pop rock
- Label: Jugoton

Crvena jabuka chronology
Tamo gdje ljubav počinje (1989)	Uzmi me (kad hoćeš ti) (1990)	Nekako s proljeća (1991)

Uzmi me (kad hoćeš ti) is a live double album by the Bosnian band Crvena jabuka. The album was recorded during a 1989 tour of the promotion of their fourth studio album Tamo gdje ljubav počinje. It was released in 1990 one year after the concert at the Zagreb Sports Arena.

One single on this album is the song "Bacila je sve niz rijeku" which was originally done by Sarajevo band Indexi.

== Track listing ==
=== CD1 ===
1. "Sve što imaš ti"
2. "Neka se sanja"
3. "Zovu nas ulice"
4. "Nek' te on ljubi"
5. "Nema više vremena"
6. "Otrov"
7. "Ostani"
8. "S Tvojih Usana"
9. "Volio bih da si tu"
10. "Tugo nesrećo"
11. "Za sve ove godine"
12. "Uzmi me (kad hoćeš ti)"
13. "Kad se kazaljke poklope"

=== CD2 ===
1. "Bacila je sve niz rijeku"
2. "Tuga ti i ja"
3. "Ti znaš"
4. "Ne dam da ovaj osjećaj ode"
5. "Tamo gdje ljubav počinje"
6. "Ima nešto od srca do srca"
7. "Bježi kišo s prozora"
8. "Dirlija"
9. "Sviđa mi se ova stvar"
10. "To mi radi"
11. "Sanjati"
12. "Suzo moja strpi se"

== Album information ==
This live double album was recorded in the Sports Arena in Zagreb. The date is still unknown.

The concert had at least 30 songs, but "Čarolija", "Zvona zvone", and "Ne daj na sebe" had to be omitted to make it a double album.

== Personnel ==
- Zlatko Arslanagic – guitar
- Drazen Zeric – vocals
- Darko Jelcic – drums, percussion
- Srdan Serberzia – bass guitar
- Zlatko Vorelovic – keyboards
