= Josipa Lisac =

Croatian singer (born 1950)

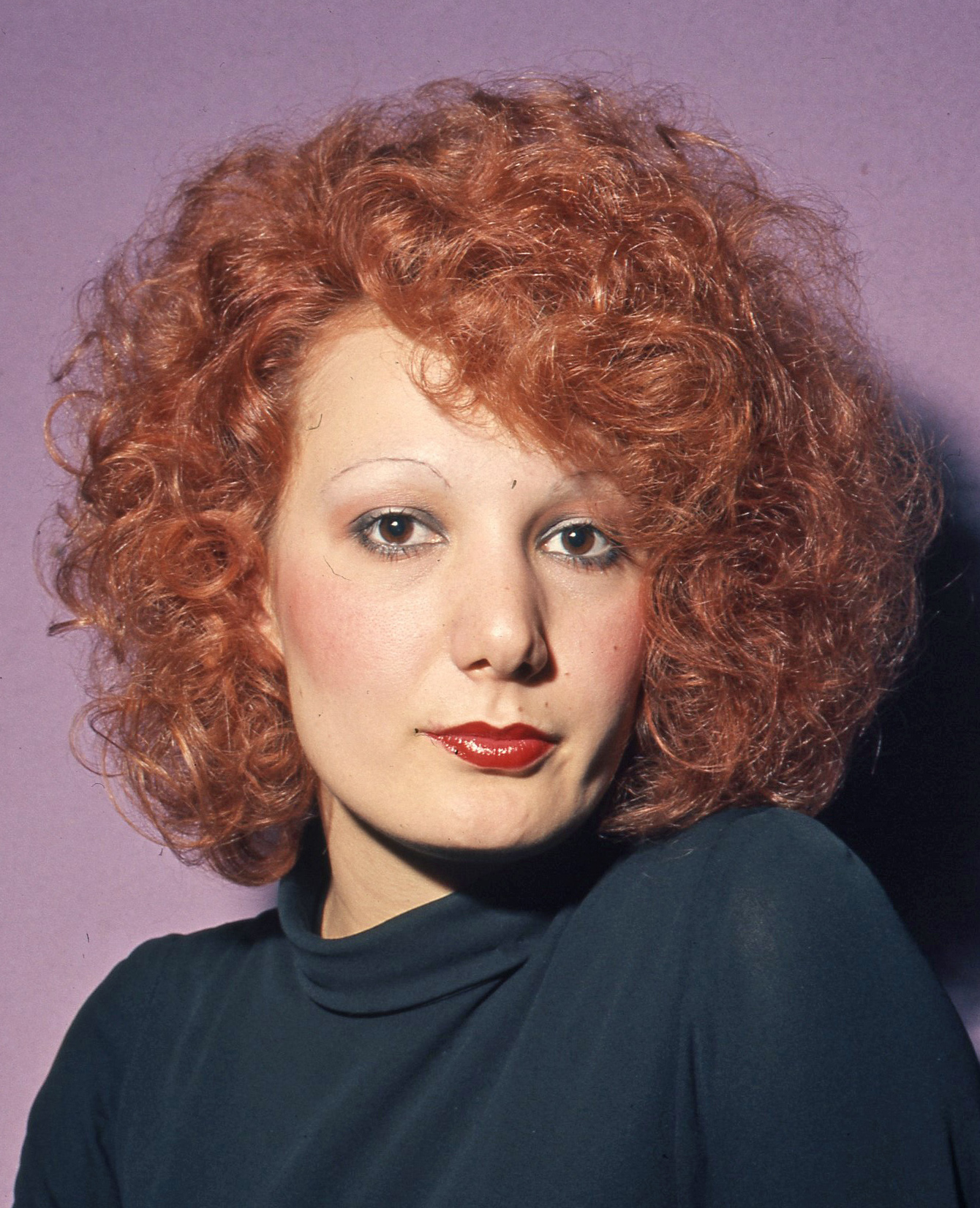
- Josipa Lisac in the early 1970s

Background information
- Born: 14 February 1950 (age 76); Zagreb, PR Croatia, Yugoslavia
- Genres: Rock; pop; soul; jazz; ethnic music
- Occupation: Singer
- Instrument: Vocals
- Years active: 1961–present
- Labels: Jugoton; Croatia Records
- Formerly of: O'Hara; Zlatni Akordi
- Partner(s): Karlo Metikoš (1971–1991; his death)
- Website: www.josipalisac.com

Josipa Lisac (pronounced [jɔ̌sipa lǐːsat͡s]; born 14 February 1950) is a Croatian singer whose work has spawned many different genres, from rock and pop to jazz and ethnic music. Known for her unique contralto, Lisac is widely considered one of the most notable female vocalists of the Croatian music scene and the former Yugoslav popular music scene.

Starting her professional career as the vocalist for the rock band O'Hara in 1967, Lisac immediately gained the attention of the Yugoslav audience and the media. In 1968, she moved to the band Zlatni Akordi, starting her solo career during the same year. During the initial phase of her solo career, she performed on Yugoslav pop festivals, gaining large attention of the public. After a series of 7-inch singles, she released her debut album Dnevnik jedne ljubavi in 1973, today widely considered one of the best albums in the history of Yugoslav popular music. The album featured songs composed by her husband Karlo Metikoš, who continued to play a pivotal role in her career in the following years.

After her second studio release, a jazz rock album recorded with B.P. Convention Big Band International, and her third studio album, Made in U.S.A., featuring songs written by a number of prominent American songwriters, Lisac turned to contemporary rock sound. Her following releases, despite bringing several hit songs, did not repeat the commercial and critical success of her debut. In the mid-1980s, she turned to performing on Yugoslav pop festivals, appearing in extravagant and flamboyant costumes, the new phase of her career reaching its highlight with the 1987 album Boginja. Following Meikoš's death in 1991, she organized tribute concerts in his honor, three of them released on live albums, and has released three more studio albums, the 2009 album Živim po svom being her latest studio release. During her career, Lisac has collaborated with a number of acts of the Croatian and Yugoslav music scenes and has received a number of awards for her work.

== Biography ==
=== Early life ===
Josipa Lisac was born in Zagreb on 14 February 1950. She started her singing career in 1961, as a member of RTV Zagreb's children choir.

=== Early career: O'Hara and Zlatni Akordi (1967–1968) ===
In 1967, Lisac became the vocalist for the band O'Hara, replacing Marcela Munger. With the arrival of Lisac, the band started to turn away from their trademark polyphonic singing and to emphasize Lisac's vocals. During this period, Lisac made one of her earliest TV appearances, performing with O'Hara in the popular TV Belgrade show Koncert za ludi mladi svet (Concert for the Crazy Young World), performing covers of the songs "One Day" and "I Can't See Nobody".

In 1968, Lisac and O'Hara organist and leader Frano Parać moved to the band Zlatni Akordi, O'Hara thus disbanding. With Zlatni Akordi, Lisac appeared on the 1968 edition of the prominent Youth Festival, held in Subotica, with the song "Sunce sja za nas" ("The Sun Shines for Us"). During the same year, Lisac made her discographic debut, on Zlatni Akordi's second EP Halo taxi, the title track originally performed on the 1968 edition of the festival Vaš šlager sezone (Your Schlager of the Season). Lisac made her solo debut on the 1968 Opatija Festival, where she performed the song "Što me čini sretnom" ("What Makes Me Happy"), written by Arsen Dedić and performed on the same festival by Bisera Veletanlić (in accordance with the rules of 1960s Yugoslav music festivals, which demanded a competing songs to be performed by two different singers). The song was polled the third best song by the festival audience. After the performance, in the autumn of the same year, Lisac left Zlatni Akordi to start her solo career.

=== Early solo career (1968–1971) ===
In 1969, Lisac appeared on the festival Slovenska popevka, performing the songs "Prazna obećanja" ("Empty Promises"), written by Arsen Dedić, and "Po nalogu zelenih očiju" ("After the Order of the Green Eyes"), written by Jure Robežnik. During the same year, she released her first solo record, a 7-inch single with the songs "Nitko nije kao ti" ("No One Is Like You") and "Naša ljubav" ("Our Love"), through Jugoton record label. For her second single, released during the same year, she recorded the songs "Živim samo za tebe" ("I Live Only for You") and "Prijatelji" ("Friends"), both written by her former O'Hara and Zlatni Akordi bandmate Frano Parać. During the initial phase of her career, Zlatni Akordi would often play as her backing band on studio recordings and live performances.

Lisac continued her breakthrough by appearing on Yugoslav festivals with the songs "Oluja" ("Storm"), "Kapetane moj" ("My Captain"), written by Zdenko Runjić, "Krenule su lađe" ("The Ships Have Sailed Out") and "Život moj" ("My Life"), written by Arsen Dedić.

=== Work with Karlo Metikoš (1971–1991) ===
In 1971, Lisac met singer and songwriter Karlo Metikoš on their joint concert in Petrinja. Metikoš had already gained fame in Yugoslavia and France as a rock and roll singer. The two soon started a relationship, Metikoš deciding to abandon his career as a performer and dedicate himself to writing songs for Lisac.

After a series of 7-inch singles, Lisac released her first solo album, Dnevnik jedne ljubavi (The Diary of a Love), in 1973. The songs on the album were composed and the album was produced by Metikoš, the songs lyrics were written by Ivica Krajač, and the arrangements were written by Branislav "Labmert" Živković. The album was recorded with the members of the jazz rock band Time and a number of musicians from the Zagreb jazz scene. The recording featured Time members Dado Topić (on tambourine), Vedran Božić (guitar), Mario Mavrin (bass guitar), Tihomir "Pop" Asanović (organ) Branislav "Lambert" Živković (piano, electric piano, flute) and Ratko Divjak (drums), as well as Indexi member Slobodan "Bodo" Kovačević (acoustic guitar), singers Dubravka Zubović and Zdenka Kovačiček (backing vocals), and several other musicians. The album artwork was designed by Krajač, and the first letters of the songs' opening lines formed the acrostic "JOSIPA LISA" (as there was no eleventh song beginning with "C"). Dnevnik jedne ljubavi was an immediate commercial and critical success, the Yugoslav music press describing it as emotional and sophisticated. The album's biggest hits were the songs "O jednoj mladosti" ("About One Youth"), "Srela sam se s njim" ("I Met With Him"), "Sreća" ("Happiness"), "Plačem" ("I'm Crying") and "Ležaj od suza" ("Bed Made of Tears"). Following the album release, Lisac, alongside the bands Time and Porodična Manufaktura Crnog Hleba, represented Yugoslavia at the 10th World Festival of Youth and Students in East Berlin.

In 1974, Lisac released her second album, Najveći uspjesi '68./ '73. (Greatest Hits '68 / '73), the compilation of hit songs from her 7-inch singles. In 1975, she starred in the first Yugoslav rock opera Gubec-beg, portraying Jana. The opera was created by Karlo Metikoš, Ivica Krajač and Miljenko Prohaska and was inspired by August Šenoa's 1887 novel The Peasant Revolt. It premiered on 8 March 1975, and was later performed around Yugoslavia, as well as in Budapest, Trieste, Rome, and Saint Petersburg, and released on the album Gubec-beg. The aria "Ave Maria" would become the opera's most famous tune and would continue to be a part of Lisac's concert repertoire until present day.

In 1976, Lisac released her second studio album, recorded with vibraphone player Boško Petrović and his Convention Big Band International, and entitled Josipa Lisac & B.P. Convention Big Band International. The album featured jazz rock covers of classics such as "My Funny Valentine" (entitled "Moj smiješni dječače"), "You Are the Sunshine of My Life" (entitled "Ti si sunce mog života"), "Something" (entitled "Nešto"), "Son of a Preacher Man" (entitled "Čovjek s tisuću mana", transl. "A Man With a Thousand Flaws") and others.

In 1977, Lisac and Metikoš travelled to the United States, where they recorded the album Made in U.S.A.. The album featured songs written by American songwriters, including Richard Supa, Stuart Scharf, Allee Willis, Bruce Roberts, Gary Wright, Ken Hirsch, Robin Batteau, Buddy Kaye and David Pomeranz, and was more mainstream-oriented than her previous releases. It featured two covers, both of songs by Van Morrison – a cover of "Moondance", entitled "Čarobna noć mjeseca" ("Magical Moon Night"), and a cover of "Crazy Love", entitled "Život s njim" ("Life With Him"). The album, however, did not repeat the success of Lisac's previous releases.

After their return to Yugoslavia, Lisac recorded the album Hir, hir, hir (Whim, Whim, Whim), releasing it in 1980. A result of Metikoš's and Krajač's attempt to move Lisac's career towards contemporary popular music, the album was generally disliked by Yugoslav music critics, although it brought the hits "Hir, hir, hir" and "Magla" ("Fog"). Lisac's following album was released in 1982 and entitled Lisica (Vixen, alluding to Lisac's last name, which means 'dogfox' in Serbo-Croatian). The album featured covers of Metikoš's two old songs, "Don't Say Goodbye", under the title "Karte na stol" ("Cards on the Table"), and "Little May", under the title "Mali ključ od zlata" ("Little Gold Key"). The 1983 album Hoću samo tebe featured songs composed by Metikoš with lyrics written by Alka Vuica. Lisac recorded the album with the band Karmela, consisting of former Boomerang and September members.

After the release of Hoću samo tebe, Lisac turned to appearing on Yugoslav pop festivals. She appeared on Portorož Festival, Split Festival, Zagreb Fest, MESAM and Jugovizija, always performing in extravagant costumes. This phase of her career had its highlight with the album Boginja (Goddess), released in 1987. The album featured songs written by Krešimir Klemenčić, who also wrote the music arrangements and produced the album. The album was followed by performances in glamorous costumes and scenery and it brought the hits "Danas sam luda" ("Today I'm Crazy") and "Gdje Dunav ljubi nebo" ("Where Danube Kisses the Sky"). With "Gdje Dunav ljubi nebo" Lisac competed in the 1987 Jugovizija, with hopes to represent Yugoslavia in the Eurovision Song Contest 1987, finishing in ninth place out of 24. She also appeared on the 1987 MESAM festival, wearing a dress with a 100m2 gown. During the same year, she released the compilation album Balade (Ballads), featuring, alongside her old songs, a cover of Procol Harum's "A Whiter Shade of Pale", entitled "Blijede sjene". During this period of her career, Lisac also took part in the recording of the soundtracks for American TV films Wallenberg: A Hero's Story (1985) and The Dirty Dozen: The Fatal Mission (1988), both shot in Yugoslavia.

After a four-year break in her discography, in 1991, Lisac released the live album Live in Lap, recorded on her two concerts held in Zagreb club Lapidarijum on 12 and 13 May 1991. Alongside her songs, the album featured covers of foreign hits.

=== Tributes to Metikoš and new releases (1991–present) ===
Following Metikoš's sudden death on 9 December 1991, Lisac organized a tribute concert in his honor. Held on the first anniversary of his death in Istra hall in Zagreb, the concert featured, beside Lisac, Arsen Dedić, Zdenka Kovačiček, Neno Belan, Dino Dvornik, Crveni Koralji, Boa, Plava Trava Zaborava, Psihomodo Pop, 4M and other artists. The recording of the concert was released on the album Ritam kiše koncert (Rhythm of the Rain Concert) in 1993. During 1992, Lisac also released the album Čestit Božić (Merry Christmas), recorded with Ivan Goran Kovačić Academical Choir and featuring covers of traditional Christmas carols, and appeared on the various artists album Rock za Hrvatsku (Rock for Croatia) with the song "Sloboda i mir" ("Freedom and Peace").

In 1994, she held another tribute concert in honor of Metikoš, held in Zagreb's Vatroslav Lisinski Concert Hall on 10 December 1994. On the concert Lisac was accompanied by Croatian Radiotelevision Symphony Orchestra and Choir and the female choir Zvjezdice (Little Stars). The recording of the concert was released on the live album Koncert u čast Karla Metikoša (Concert in Honor of Karlo Metikoš). The album featured her songs written by Metikoš, as well as arias from Gubec-beg. During 1994, Lisac also acted in the theatre play Suzna Maria Sirakuška (Maria of Syracuse in Tears), directed by D. Z. Frej and produced by Koreodrama theatre from Slovenia. In 1996, Lisac was awarded with the Order of Danica Hrvatska with the Face of Marko Marulić for her contribution to Croatian culture. In 1997, she appeared in another Koreodrama play, Šizofrenija (Schizophrenia), also directed by Frej, and sang in the new production of Gubec-beg, performed in the Vatroslav Lisinski Concert Hall. The new production featured, alongside Lisac, Anja Šovagović, Dado Topić, Massimo Savić, Tony Cetinski, and other artists. In December of the same year, the box set Antologija (Anthology) was released, featuring eight CDs with almost complete opus by Lisac. It was followed by the 1998 compilation The Best Of, released in luxurious package and featuring the songs picked by Lisac herself.

In 2000, Lisac released her ninth studio album, entitled Život (Life). The album featured Metikoš's songs, some of them previously recorded by different acts, and some of them previously unrecorded, as well as a cover of the Spencer Davis Group song "Gimme Some Lovin'". The album was produced and the arrangements were written by Gojko Tomanović and recorded with studio musicians. Život was followed by the double live album Live, released in 2002 and featuring recordings from Lisac's concerts held in the Vatroslav Lisinski Concert Hall on 10 December 2001, the Križanke Outdoor Theatre in Ljubljana on 11 June 2001, and the Lent festival in Maribor on 25 June 2001. The recording of her concert held in the Croatian National Theatre in Zagreb on 3 December 2006 was released on the DVD Koncert ljubavi u čast Karla Metikoša (Concert of Love in Honor of Karlo Metikoš). The concert was directed by theatre director Dora Ruždjak, with the songs split into "four seasons".

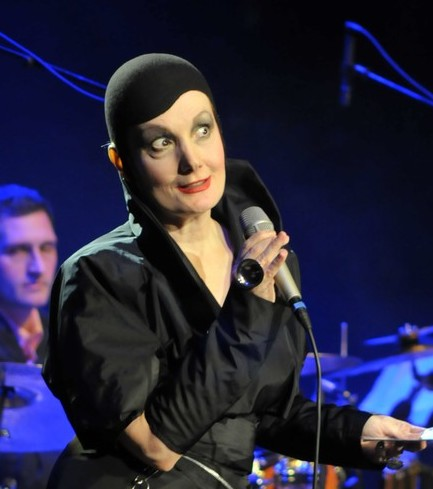
Lisac performing in Vatroslav Lisinski Concert Hall in Zagreb, 2009

In 2009, Lisac released her tenth and latest studio album, entitled Živim po svome (I'm Living My Way). The album was produced by Elvis Stanić, who also authored part of the songs. The rest of the songs was written by Meri Cetinić, Meri Trošelj, Jani Hace, and Srđan Sekulović. The album featured a live cover of Drago Mlinarec song "Helena lijepa i ja u kiši" ("Helena the Beautiful and I in the Rain"), recorded during Lisac's 2005 performance at the Boogaloo club in Zagreb. For the various artists album Ritam & riff – mala glazbena antologija hrvatskog pjesništva (Rhythm & Riff – A Little Music Anthology of Croatian Poetry), released in 2010 with a copy of the Poezija (Poetry) magazine, she recorded the song "Zavjet" ("Oath"), composed by Ante Perković on the poem of Vesna Parun. In 2013, in order to mark the 40th anniversary of Dnevnik jedne ljubavi, Croatia Records reissued the album on white vinyl and awarded Lisac with the Special Accolade for Exceptional Contribution to Croatian Music Scene. In 2014, Lisac and Serbian multi-instrumentalist Slobodan Trkulja, accompanied by the Metropole Orchestra, performed the Međimurje traditional song "Zvira voda" on the celebration of the International Day of Peace in Amsterdam.

In 2017, her studio and live albums were released on two six-piece box sets entitled Original Album Collection Vol. 1 and Vol. 2. The double compilation album Posve slobodna (Suradnje i etno) (Completely Free (Collaborations and Ethno)), released during the same year, featured the songs she recorded with other artists on one disc, and on the other were her versions of traditional songs. Two of them, "Vuprem oči" and "Dremle mi se, dremle", were originally recorded for the theatre play Pijana noć 1918 (Drunken Night of 1918) directed by Lenka Udovički, and were previously unreleased.

Lisac marked 50 years of her solo career with the live album ...tu u mojoj duši stanuješ... (...You Live Here in My Soul...), released in 2018. The album was recorded during a six-hour session and featured Lisac's old hits in new arrangements. The session was also shot in 4K resolution and released on Blu-ray accompanied by an interview with Lisac. The 2020 four-piece box set Diskobiografija (Discobiography), the concept of which was created by Siniša Škarica, was released to mark Lisac's 70th birthday. The album featured 70 of her songs, the fourth disc featuring live recordings. In February 2020, Lisac performed the Croatian national anthem at the inauguration of President Zoran Milanović, sparking divisive reactions of the public with her unconventional interpretation. A criminal complaint was submitted against her by attorney Boško Županović for "performing and intoning the Croatian national anthem in a derogatory way" during the inauguration. In 2022, another four-piece box set was released, entitled Original Album Collection Live and featuring live albums Koncert u čast Karla Metikoša, Live, Koncert ljubavi u čast Karla Metikoša (originally released as a video album only) and ...tu u mojoj duši stanuješ....

=== Collaborations and guest appearances ===
During her career, Lisac has collaborated with a number of prominent acts, making guest appearances on a number of records.

In 1971, she appeared as guest vocalist in the rock epic "1941." by progressive rock band Korni Grupa. "1941." was written on the lyrics of Branko Ćopić and originally recorded as a soundtrack for the Jedan čovek jedna pesma (One Man – One Song) television series, directed by Jovan Ristić and with mise-en-scène written by Momo Kapor. The composition was released in 1979 as Korni Grupa's studio album 1941. In 1986, she made a guest appearance on the album Jahači magle (Fog Riders) by the rock band Bajaga i Instruktori, in the song "Ja mislim 300 na sat" ("I Think at 300 kmph"). In 1994, she made a guest appearance on Boa album Kraj djetinjstva (The End of Childhood), in the song "Kao mir" ("Like Peace"). In 1994, she also made a guest appearance on Telephone Blues Band live album Telephone Blues Band & All Stars Session, recorded on their concerts held in the club Saloon on 28 and 29 of March 1994, receiving the Porin Award for Best Female Vocalist for the album song "Po prvi put" ("For the First Time"). She made a guest appearance on the song "Kralj ulice" ("King of the Street") by the band Roderick Novy, released on their 2001 album O čemu pjevamo kada pjevamo o ljubavi (What Do We Sing About When We Sing About Love). She recorded vocals for the song "Posve slobodna" ("Completely Free"), released on Elvis Stanić's 2005 album Bolja strana svijeta (Better Side of the World). On the 2010 album Makedonsko srce kuca u 7/8 (Macedonian Heart Beats in the 7/8 Rhythm) by Garo & Tavitjan Brothers she made a guest appearance in the cover of the traditional song "Kalino mome". She appeared on the album 2014 album Sjene (Shadows) by the band Quasarr, in the song "Ljubav" ("Love"). She made a guest appearance on the re-recording of Hladno Pivo's song "Soundtrack za život" ("Soundtrack for Life"), released on the band's 2017 compilation 30 godina Greatest Hits (30 Years Greatest Hits).

In 1994, she took part in the recording of the album Dynamo by the theatre troupe Montažstroj, the album featuring the music from their play Everybody Goes to Disco from Moscow to San Francisco. She made a guest appearance on the 1998 live album Viva la Habana! by the Latin music band Cubismo, singing in their version of her song "Na, na, na, na".

== Legacy ==
In 1996, Lisac was awarded with the Order of Danica Hrvatska with the Face of Marko Marulić for her contribution to Croatian culture. During her career, she has received 35 Porin awards, including the Porin Lifetime Achievement Award.

Lisac's song "Ti si genije" ("You're a Genius"), originally released on Made in U.S.A., was covered by Yugoslav girl group Aska on their 1982 album Disco Rock. Her song "Sreća" was covered in 2015 by Croatian singer Antonela Doko for the album Zimzeleno a novo (Evergreen But New).

The album Dnevnik jedne ljubavi was polled in 1998 as 9th on the list of 100 Greatest Yugoslav Popular Music Albums in the book YU 100: najbolji albumi jugoslovenske rok i pop muzike (YU 100: The Best albums of Yugoslav pop and rock music). In 2015, Dnevnik jedne ljubavi was polled as 11th on the list of 100 Greatest Yugoslav Albums published by the Croatian edition of Rolling Stone.

In 2000, the song "Magla" was polled No.59 on Rock Express Top 100 Yugoslav Rock Songs of All Times list. In 2006, "O jednoj mladosti" was polled No.24 on the B92 Top 100 Yugoslav songs list.

== Personal life ==
Lisac was in a relationship with Croatian musician and songwriter Karlo Metikoš from 1971 until his death in December 1991. The two never officially married and did not have children.

=== Politics ===
Ahead of the 2013 Croatian constitutional referendum, Lisac publicly supported the LGBT community.

== Discography ==
=== Studio albums ===
- Dnevnik jedne ljubavi (1973)
- Josipa Lisac & B.P. Convention Big Band International (with B.P. Convention Big Band, 1976)
- Made in U.S.A. (1979)
- Hir, hir, hir (1980)
- Lisica (1982)
- Hoću samo tebe (1983)
- Boginja (1987)
- Čestit Božić (with Ivan Goran Kovačić Academical Choir, 1992)
- Život (2000)
- Živim po svome (2009)

=== Live albums ===
- Live in Lap (1991)
- Koncert u čast Karla Metikoša (1995)
- Live (2002)
- ...tu u mojoj duši stanuješ... (2018)

=== Compilation albums ===
- Najveći uspjesi '68./ '73. (1974)
- Balade (1987)
- The Best Of (1998)
- Hitovi (1998)
- The Platinum Collection (2007)
- Posve slobodna (Suradnje i etno) (2017)

=== Box sets ===
- Antologija (1997)
- Original Album Collection Vol. 1 (2017)
- Original Album Collection Vol. 2 (2017)
- Diskobiografija (2020)
- Original Album Collection Live (2022)

=== Video albums ===
- Koncert ljubavi u čast Karla Metikoša (2007)
- ...tu u mojoj duši stanuješ... (2018)

=== Singles ===
==== As lead artist ====
Title	Year	Peak chart positions	Album
Title	Year	HR Top 100	Album
"Naša ljubav" / "Niko nije kao ti"	1969	(Note: HR Top 40 was launched on 24 January 2013.)	Non-album singles
"Živim samo za tebe" / "Prijatelji"	1969	(Note: HR Top 40 was launched on 24 January 2013.)	Non-album singles
"Život moj" / "Spustila se kiša"	1970	(Note: HR Top 40 was launched on 24 January 2013.)	Non-album singles
"Kapetane moj" / "I teče, teče vrijeme"	1970	(Note: HR Top 40 was launched on 24 January 2013.)	Non-album singles
"Oluja" / "Osamljenost"	1970	(Note: HR Top 40 was launched on 24 January 2013.)	Non-album singles
"Samujem u samoći sama" / "Sve majke svijeta uz more"	1971	(Note: HR Top 40 was launched on 24 January 2013.)	Non-album singles
"Dok razmišljam o nama" / "Bez tebe"	1972	(Note: HR Top 40 was launched on 24 January 2013.)	Non-album singles
"Raduj se srce moje" / "Još te čekam"	1972	(Note: HR Top 40 was launched on 24 January 2013.)	Non-album singles
"Na, na, na, na" / "Veče u luna parku"	1973	(Note: HR Top 40 was launched on 24 January 2013.)	Non-album singles
"Omer beže" / "Niz polje idu babo"	1974	(Note: HR Top 40 was launched on 24 January 2013.)	Non-album singles
"Ostaješ mi samo ti" / "Ležaj od suza" (Note: "Ležaj od suza" is included in Dnevnik jedne ljubavi.)	1974	(Note: HR Top 40 was launched on 24 January 2013.)	Non-album singles
"Činim sve u krivi čas" / "Čovjek"	1976	(Note: HR Top 40 was launched on 24 January 2013.)	Non-album singles
"Danas sam luda" / "Lažeš da si moj"	1987	(Note: HR Top 40 was launched on 24 January 2013.)	Boginja
"Ja bolujem"	1987	(Note: HR Top 40 was launched on 24 January 2013.)	Balade
"Samo iluzija" / "Vir"	1991	(Note: HR Top 40 was launched on 24 January 2013.)	Split '91
"1000 razloga"	2007	(Note: HR Top 40 was launched on 24 January 2013.)	Živim po svome
"Tu"	2015	25	Non-album singles
"Daleko"	2020		Non-album singles
"A gdje si ti"	2023		Non-album singles
"Zamisli"	2025	3	Non-album singles
