= Željko Brodarić =

Yugoslav rock musician (1962-1986)

- Also known as: Jappa
- Born: 1954 (age 71–72)
- Origin: Split, Croatia
- Genres: Hard rock; power pop; new wave; jazz
- Instruments: Vocals, guitar, bass guitar, keyboards
- Years active: 1974–present
- Labels: Diskoton, Jugoton, Suzy, Croatia Records
- Formerly of: Metak

Željko Brodarić "Jappa" (born 1954) is a Croatian and Yugoslav musician and music producer, known as the guitarist and vocalist of the rock band Metak, as well as for producing albums by a number of prominent acts of the Yugoslav rock scene.

Brodarić started his career in his home city Split in the early 1970s, joining the band Metak in 1978 as guitarist. After the departure of the band's original vocalist Ranko Boban, Brodarić also took over the vocal duties. With Metak, he recorded two studio albums, gaining significant popularity on the Yugoslav music scene. After Metak disbanded in 1981, Brodarić started a short-lasting career as a solo act, releasing one studio album. In mid-1980s, he dedicated himself to album production, producing works by a number of prominent acts of the Yugoslav rock scene, including Haustor, Regata, Animatori, D' Boys, Đavoli, Crvena Jabuka, and others. In late 2000s, he turned to jazz – in 2008, he formed his jazz fusion trio Jappa Band, and since 2016, he has been performing with his daughter Sara Brodarić Ševgić.

== Musical career ==
=== Early career (1974–1978) ===
Brodarić started his career at the age of eighteen, playing guitar with the veteran Split band Delfini. In 1976, he started the band Put (Road) with his brother Zlatko and brothers Boro (bass guitar) and Milo Vasić (drums).

=== Metak (1978–1981) ===
In 1978, he joined the band Metak, formed shortly before by bass guitarist Mirko Krstičević, poet and lyricist Momčilo Popadić, guitarist and vocalist Ranko Boban and drummer Matko Jelavić. After Boban's departure in the autumn of 1978, Brodarić, in addition to playing guitar, took over the vocal duties. After Metak was joined by Zlatko Brodarić (guitar) and Doris Tomić (keyboards), the band recorded two studio albums and two 7-inch singles, achieving significant popularity on the Yugoslav rock scene. The band split up at the end of 1981.

=== Solo career (1982) ===
After Metak disbanded, Brodarić recorded his solo album Majmuni (Monkeys), released in 1982. Brodarić authored all the songs on the album, with part of the songs originally written for Metak's never-recorded third studio album. On the album recording, Brodarić sang, played guitar, bass guitar and keyboards and produced the record. Drums on the recording were played by Ivan Čović "Pipo", who also co-produced the album, and the record also featured guest appearances by former members of Metak. Backing vocals were provided by Tedi Spalato and the members of the pop group Magazin. The album was well received by the Yugoslav audience, with the songs "Majmun radi što majmun vidi" ("Monkey See, Monkey Do"), "U krivom snu" ("In a Wrong Dream"), "Pokrivaš lice" ("You're Covering Your Face"), "Meni je dobro" ("I Feel Fine") and a new version of Metak's old song "Split at Night" receiving large airplay.

=== Music production (1982–2002) ===
After the release of his only solo album, Brodarić dedicated himself to producing records, soon gaining a reputation as being one of the best Yugoslav producers. During the 1980s, he produced albums by Magazin, D' Boys, Animatori, Regata, Đavoli, Crvena Jabuka and other artists.

During the 1990s, Brodarić lived in Italy and England. After returning to Split, he produced the album Ararita by Croatian singer Lvky, which was in 2023 awarded the Porin Award for Best Rock Album. In 2004, Brodarić released the compilation album Moj novi val (My New Wave), featuring the most successful songs from the albums he had produced.

=== Career in jazz (2008–present) ===
In 2008, Brodarić started his jazz fusion trio Jappa Band. Different lineups of the band featured bass guitarists Jakša Matošić and Goran Slaviček (of the band Otprilike Ovako) and drummer Jaran Dučić (of the jazz rock band Black Coffee). Since 2016, he has been performing with his daughter Sara Brodarić Ševgić. The two, performing under the name Sara & Jappa, perform jazz standards, with Sara Brodarić Ševgić singing and Brodarić playing acoustic guitar. The two have been among the organizers of Split at Night Jazz Festival. The recording of their festival performance held in the Cellars of Diocletian's Palace on 23 August 2018 was released on the album Split at Night Jazz Festival.

== Family ==
Željko Brodarić is the brother of Zlatko Brodarić, also a former Metak member. After the disbandment of Metak, Zlatko Brodarić became a studio musician, and later a composer and performer of instrumental music, releasing six instrumental music albums to date.

Željko Brodarić is the father of vocalist Sara Brodarić Ševagić.

== Legacy ==
Metak's biggest hit was the song "Da mi je biti morski pas" ("Wish I Were a Shark"), released on a 7-inch single in 1980. The song was covered by Croatian and Yugoslav hard rock band Osmi Putnik on their 1987 album Glasno, glasnije (Loud, Louder), by Serbian and Yugoslav funk rock band Deca Loših Muzičara, for Srđan Dragojević's 1994 film Dva sata kvalitetnog TV programa (Two Hours of Quality TV Program), and by Croatian rock band Lili Gee, for the 2023 White Shark campaign, dedicated to preservation of sharks. The 1999 film Wish I Were a Shark by Split director Ognjen Sviličić was inspired by the song. In 2006, the song was polled No.55 on the B92 Top 100 Yugoslav songs list.

The lyrics of Metak's 1979 song "Nalazim nebo" ("I'm Finding the Sky"), authored by Željko Brodarić, are featured in Petar Janjatović's book Pesme bratstva, detinjstva & potomstva: Antologija ex YU rok poezije 1967 - 2007 (Songs of Brotherhood, Childhood & Offspring: Anthology of Ex YU Rock Poetry 1967 – 2007).

Haustor album Treći svijet (Third World), produced by Brodarić, was in 1998 polled No.20 on the list of 100 Greatest Albums of Yugoslav Popular Music, published in the book YU 100: najbolji albumi jugoslovenske rok i pop muzike (YU 100: The Best albums of Yugoslav pop and rock music). The list of 100 Greatest Yugoslav Albums published by the Croatian edition of Rolling Stone in 2015 features two albums produced by Brodarić: Haustor's Treći svijet, polled No.8, and Animatori's Anđeli nas zovu da im skinemo krila (Angels Are Inviting Us to Take Their Wings Off), polled No.80.

== Discography ==
=== With Metak ===
==== Studio albums ====
- U tetrapaku (1979)
- Ratatatatija (1980)

==== Compilation albums ====
- Da mi je biti morski pas (1995)

==== Singles ====
- "Šijavica" / "Gastarbajterska balada" (1978)
- "Ona ima svoju dragu mamu" / "Revolver" (1979)
- "Da mi je biti morski pas" / "Rock'n'roller" (1980)

=== Solo ===
==== Studio albums ====
- Majmuni (1982)

==== Compilation albums ====
- Moj novi val (2004)

==== Singles ====
- "Majmun radi što majmun vidi" / "Nikad kao kada smo sami" (1982)

=== As producer ===
==== Studio albums ====
- Zok – Zok (1982)
- Jappa – Majmuni (1982)
- Magazin – Slatko stanje
- D' Boys – Ajd' se zezamo! (1983)
- Animatori – Anđeli nas zovu da im skinemo krila (1983)
- Magazin – Kokolo (1983)
- Magazin – O la-la (1984)
- Haustor – Treći svijet (1984)
- Regata – Noćna regata (1984)
- Crvena Jabuka – Crvena Jabuka (1986)
- Regata – Spavaj mi vještice (1986)
- Boris Dvornik – Život ti je ka lišina (1986)
- Đavoli – Hallo Lulu (1987)
- Crvena Jabuka – Za sve ove godine (1987)
- Nemoguće Vruće – Ljubavi malog Werthera (1987)
- Đavoli – Ostani uz mene (1988)
- Rusija – Glasnost (1988)
- Ritam Srca – Pod tvojim prozorom (1989)
- Kotrljajuće Kamenje – Samo je ljubav (1990)
- Sedmo Nebo – Pjesma moje ulice (1990)
- Vještice – Bez tišine! (1991)
- Jakša & Navigatori – Električne serenade (1991)
- Crno Vino – Voljeti (1991)
- Mucalo – Mucalo (1992)
- Lvky – Ararita (2002)

==== Singles ====
- Jappa – "Majmun radi što majmun vidi" / "Nikad kao kada smo sami" (1982)
- Magazin – "Slatko stanje" / "Moja mala mila" (1982)
- D' Boys – "Mi smo D' Boys" / "Crne oči, plava ljubav" (1983)
- Animatori – "Anđeli nas zovu da im skinemo krila" / "Ljeto nam se vratilo" (1983)
- Regata – "Andrea" / "Za tebe" (1984)
- Rusija – "Slatki moj doktore" / "Kiša" (1988)
- Mucalo – "Prazna objećanja" (2001)
