= House on the Sand =

Kuća na pijesku
- Directed by: Ivan Martinac
- Written by: Ivan Martinac
- Starring: Dušan Janićijević; Branko Ðurić
- Cinematography: Andrija Pivčević
- Edited by: Ivan Martinac
- Music by: Mirko Krstičević
- Production company: Marjan film
- Release date: 19 December 1985
- Running time: 85 minutes
- Country: Croatia
- Language: Croatian

House on the Sand (Kuća na pijesku) is the only feature film directed by Ivan Martinac, one of the key figures of Croatian avant-garde and underground film scene.

== Plot ==
A middle-aged archaeologist, Josip Križanić, returns from fieldwork in Ampurias on coast of Catalonia to his home in Split. Josip is a divorced father of a teenage girl living a monotonous and solitary life. A few months later he commits suicide. His friend, district court judge Jakov Kostelac, finds a tape, an audio diary, and tries to solve the mystery of his friend's act.

== Cast ==
- Dušan Janićijević as archaeologist Josip Krizanić
- Branko Ðurić as district court judge Jakov Kostelac
- Dijana Zulim as Josips's daughter Katarina
- Marina Nemet as Laura Neumann, Josip's wife
- Jadranka Stilin as Jakov's sister Mirjana Kostelac
- Vasja Kovačić as Ivan
- Josip Genda as Luka
- Branko Karabatić as Petar

== Production ==
Martinac, highly decorated and influential author of some 70 short films, unsuccessfully searched for funding of various feature film projects since 1969. Finally in 1983 production company Marjan film approved funding for his fourth feature film project House on the Sand. Gian Maria Volonté was Martinac's first choice to play Josip Krizanić, and while actor accepted the role in February 1984, collaboration ultimately failed to materialize due to scheduling issues. As a result, Dušan Janićijević was selected for the lead role. Martinac's long a longtime associate and Cine Club Split colleague Andrija Pivčević was selected as cinematographer and founder of the defunct rock band Metak, Mirko Krstičević, was selected to compose the film score. Trio previously collaborated on several short films, most notably the celebrated Exile (Izgnanstvo, 1979–1981). Most of the filming was done during winter and autumn in the family home of the artist Vasko Lipovac in Split.

== Reception ==
At the time of its release film received mixed reviews and it had only 22 public screenings between 1985 and 1990, but over the years it has come to be considered a classic. Italian film critic Sergio Grmek Germani (it) considers it the most important Croatian feature film of all time and is of the opinion that while it could have been formally incomprehensible at the time of its creation, today it is easily recognized as an example of slow cinema two decades before the emergence of this trend in art film.
