= Treći svijet =

Studio album by Haustor
- Released: 28 February 1984
- Recorded: September–November 1983
- Studio: Studio Tetrapak (Split, SR Croatia, SFR Yugoslavia)
- Genre: Rock
- Label: Jugoton
- Producer: Željko Brodarić

Haustor chronology
Haustor (1981)	Treći svijet (1984)	Bolero (1985)

Treći svijet (eng. Third world) is the second studio album by the Croatian-Yugoslav rock band Haustor, released in 1984.

The only song on the album that deviated a little from the atmosphere and overall concept is Radnička klasa odlazi u raj, which was intended to be on the band's self-titled debut LP but received push-back from the label due to its controversial political content.

This record reveals how much the group was ahead of its time, because the selection of melodies, harmonies, verses on critical reflection and the ever-current political incorrectness, packed in excellent arrangements and production, sound current and modern to this day.

== Background ==
During 1982, Haustor released the EP Zima/Majmuni i mjesec/Capri. On January 6, 1982, the group held a farewell concert before Sacher's departure for his mandatory service in the Yugoslav People's Army. A recording from it was later released on the live album Ulje je na vodi in 1995. In the meantime, Rundek got a job at Radio Zagreb, thus managing to avoid his military service.

The first performance after Sacher's return was in September 1983 in Ljubljana. Later, Rundek gave an interview to a magazine.

== Album ==
Darko Rundek wrote the lyrics while Srđan Sacher focused on music and composition, heavily inspired from the music of Jamaica, adapted for a more domestic setting. After Sacher left the group, there was a serious crisis.

The song Radnička klasa odlazi u raj (eng. The Working Class Goes to Heaven) was supposed to be on the debut LP Haustor, but was judged as too provocative by Jugoton and got replaced with Moja prva ljubav. The sound is mainly influenced by The Clash and Elvis Costello. It is one of the first albums recorded in Split's Studio Tetrapak.

In 2022, a remastered version was re-released on vinyl by Croatia Records, accommodated with the band's reunion.

== Reception ==
The portal music-box.hr stated in its review regarding the reissue that there's no working class today, at least not in the same form and sense as forty or more years ago, whether it has gone to heaven or perhaps somewhere else, but also today it stands proudly as a slight jab at all the authorities. It received a 5 star rating.

== Legacy ==
In September 2023, a documentary film named after the album was announced at the Belgrade Dok'n'Ritam festival. It is directed by Arsen Oremović and focuses on the partnership between Rundek and Sacher. The film premiered at the Sarajevo Film Festival on August 17, 2025.

== Track listing ==
All lyrics are written by Darko Rundek; all music is composed by Srđan Sacher.

No.	Title	Length
1.	"Neobičan Dan"	3:50
2.	"Zadnji Pogled Na Jeršaleim"	5:53
3.	"Babilonske Baklje"	5:00
4.	"Patuljci U Vrtu"	4:58
5.	"Radnička Klasa Odlazi U Raj"	3:05
6.	"Donje Strane Munje"	3:56
7.	"Skriven Iza Lažnih Imena"	5:00
8.	"Treći Svijet"	5:41
Total length:		8

== Charts ==
=== Weekly charts ===
==== 2022 ====
Chart	Peak position
HR Top 40	1

==== 2023 ====
Chart	Peak position
HR Top 40	2

=== Monthly charts ===
==== 2022 ====
Chart	Peak position
HDU	1

==== 2023 ====
Chart	Peak position
HDU	3
