= Mhm a-ha oh yeah da-da =

Studio album by Rundek Cargo Orkestar
- Released: June 26, 2006
- Label: Menart

Mhm a-ha oh yeah da-da is the only studio album of the group Cargo Orkestar whose leader was Darko Rundek. On this album, the songs were sung in Croatian, English, German and French. The album was released in June 2006 by Menart.

== Background ==
In the spring of 2003, Rundek founded a new band Cargo Orkestar, mainly from the musicians with whom he recorded "Ruke" and went on tour with him in Croatia, Bosnia, Serbia and Montenegro. As part of that tour, 7 concerts were held in Zagreb that made up the "Blue Tour" on which the album "Zagrebačka Magla" was created.

From 2003 to 2005, Rundek filmed A View from Eiffel Tower, 100 Minutes of Glory, and Ruins.

== Reception ==
The Serbian newspaper Danas wrote that one of the important features of this album is painting through tone, and that thanks to this, Cargo Orkestar opened an unopenable.

The newspaper Politika wrote that thematically, the album acts as a travel record, on which musical ambiances and singing in several languages have merged into almost diary entries recorded during joint work.
