= Najveći uspjesi '68./'73. =

Greatest hits album by Josipa Lisac
- Released: 1974
- Genre: Pop; rock
- Length: 37:30
- Language: Croatian
- Label: Jugoton
- Producer: Karlo Metikoš

Josipa Lisac chronology
Dnevnik jedne ljubavi (1973)	Najveći uspjesi '68./'73. (1974)	Josipa Lisac & B.P. Convention Big Band International (1976)

Najveći uspjesi '68./'73. (Croatian for 'Greatest Hits '68/'73') is the first greatest hits album by Croatian singer Josipa Lisac. It was released by Jugoton in 1974. The compilation contains several stand-alone singles that Lisac performed at festivals prior to the release of her debut studio album Dnevnik jedne ljubavi (1973).

== Track listing ==
No.	Title	Lyrics	Music	Performed at	Length
1.	"Što me čini sretnom"	Arsen Dedić; Pajo Kanižaj	Dedić	Opatija Festival 1968	3:40
2.	"Krenule su lađe"	Dedić; Vinko Lesić	Dedić	Split Festival 1969	3:17
3.	"Igra valova u mom sjećanju" (Playing Solitaire with My Memories)	Vesna Lukatela	Bill Martin; Phil Coulter	Split Festival 1969	3:02
4.	"Još te čekam"	Kanižaj	Mario Bogliuni	Jugovizija 1970	2:50
5.	"Život moj"	Dedić	Dedić	Zagreb Festival 1970	5:45
6.	"Oluja"	Zdenko Runjić	Runjić	Opatija Festival 1970	4:20
7.	"Kapetane moj"	Tomislav Zuppa	Runjić	Split Festival 1970	4:16
8.	"I teče, teče vrijeme"	Tona Adnim	Marija Radić	Zagreb Festival 1970	3:53
9.	"Dok razmišljam o nama"	Ivica Krajač	Karlo Metikoš	Zagreb Festival 1972	3:35
10.	"Na, na, na, na"	Krajač	Metikoš	Opatija Festival 1973	2:52
Total length:					37:30
