= Bolero (Haustor album) =

Studio album by Haustor
- Released: October 1985
- Studio: SIM studio (Zagreb, SR Croatia, SFR Yugoslavia)
- Genre: Rock, pop
- Label: Jugoton
- Producer: Dragan Čaćinović; Mitar Subotić

Haustor chronology
Treći svijet (1984)	Bolero (1985)	Tajni grad (1988)

Singles from Bolero
- 1. "Ena" / "Take the Money and Run" Released: 1985

Bolero is a 1985 album by Yugoslav and Croatian band Haustor. It is considered to be one of their best albums.

The album has 8 songs, and notable hits are "Ena", "Šejn", "Sejmeni" and "Šal od svile".

== Background ==
The recording of this album took place from December 1984 to June 1985. Actor Rade Šerbedžija appeared as a guest on this album. The back cover was created by Rundek himself.

There are videos for Ena (3 versions), Šejn, Take The Money And Run and Sejmeni.

== Track listing ==
All tracks are written by Darko Rundek.

No.	Title	Length
1.	"Bolero"	5:25
2.	"Ena"	3:53
3.	"TV Man"	5:47
4.	"Sejmeni"	4:06
5.	"Take The Money And Run"	4:22
6.	"Ja želim"	3:04
7.	"Šejn"	4:44
8.	"Šal od svile"	5:45
