= Haustor =

Yugoslav rock band

- Haustor in 1988

Background information
- Origin: Zagreb, SR Croatia, SFR Yugoslavia
- Genres: New wave; reggae; psychedelia; post-punk; world music; art rock; pop rock
- Years active: 1979–1990 (Reunions: 1996, 2022)
- Labels: Jugoton; Blind Dog; Croatia; Dancing Bear
- Past members: Darko Rundek; Srđan Sacher; Boris Leiner; Ozren Štiglić; Zoran Perišić; Zoran Vuletić; Damir Prica; Nikola Santro; Srđan Gulić; Zoran Zajec; Mario Barišin; Alen Bjelinski; Igor Pavlica; Marino Pelajić; Julije Reljić

Haustor (transl. Passageway) was a Yugoslav rock band formed in Zagreb in 1979. Haustor is considered one of the most prominent bands of the Yugoslav new wave scene, as well as one of the most notable and influential acts of the Yugoslav rock scene in general.

The band was formed by vocalist and occasional guitarist Darko Rundek and bass guitarist Srđan Sacher, the two being the group's key creative figures. Haustor gained the attention of the public with their new wave sound influenced by ethnic music and their theatrical live performances. Their self-titled debut album, released in 1981—today considered one of key albums of Yugoslav new wave—launched them to nationwide fame and critical acclaim. In 1984, the band released the album Treći svijet, featuring distinctive world music-influenced sound with Rudnek's poetic lyrics inspired by various works of literature, films and comics. Despite the album receiving praises from Yugoslav music press, Sacher left the band after the follow-up tour, leaving Rundek as the band's sole composer and lyricist. The albums Bolero, released in 1986, and Tajni grad, released in 1988, were well received by the public and the music critics. However, the band suddenly disbanded in 1990, while in the midst of recording their fifth studio album. After the group ended their activity, Rundek made a highly successful career as singer-songwriter.

Haustor reunited in 1996 with both Rundek and Sacher for a live performance in Zagreb. The group made one more one-off reunion, in 2022, when the lineup that worked on the album Treći svijet reunited to rework the title track for the album's vinyl reissue.

== History ==
=== 1979–1990 ===
==== New wave years (1979–1982) ====
The basis of the band was formed in 1977, when Darko Rundek and Srđan Sacher started the informal group Komuna (Comune), with which they performed occasionally. At the time, Rundek studied literature and wrote theatre reviews for newspapers, and was for a period of time the editor of the cultural column in Studentski list (Student Paper). In 1979, the two formed Haustor, the first lineup featuring Rundek (vocals, occasionally guitar), Sacher (bass guitar), Boris Leiner (drums) and Ozren Štiglić (guitar), the latter formerly of the band Eustahijevi Virtuozi (Eustachi's Virtuosos). The band was initially named Nagradni Bataljon (Prize Battalion), having rehearsals in the premises of Kugla glumište, with which they often cooperated.

At the beginning of the band's career, drummer Boris Leiner simultaneously performed with Haustor and the band Azra, before he was replaced in Haustor by Zoran Perišić. The band was soon joined by Zoran Vuletić (keyboards), Damir Prica "Capri" (saxophone) and Nikola Santro (trombone). In 1980, thanks to the aid of radio journalist Anđelko Maletić and music critic Dražen Vrdoljak, the band got an opportunity to record two songs for Radio Zagreb. One of the two songs, "Moja prva ljubav" ("My First Love"), the lyrics of which were partially inspired by the short story "The Girls in Their Summer Dresses" by Irwin Shaw, soon became a radio hit. The band gained new attention of the public with their well-received performance at the 1980 Subotica Youth Festival. They were noted for their artistic songs and performances, influenced by Rundek's and Sacher's interests – Rundek, who had switched to studies of directing at the Zagreb Academy of Dramatic Art, introduced theatricality, pantomime and theatrical makeup into the band's performances, while Sacher, who was at the time a student of archaeology and ethnology, introduced elements of Yugoslav and foreign ethnic music into the band's new wave sound.

At the beginning of 1981, the band recorded their debut release, a 7-inch single with a new version of "Moja prva ljubav" and the song "Pogled u bolju budućnost" ("A View into a Better Future"), the first recorded with Leiner playing the drums. Following the single release, Haustor performed in Belgrade, on the Pozdrav iz Zagreba (Greetings from Zagreb) festival held in Belgrade Youth Center, opening for and gaining more attention of the audience than the already established Prljavo Kazalište. During the spring, Perišić was replaced by new drummer, Srđan Gulić, with whom they started recording their debut album.

The band's self titled-debut album was released in 1981 through Jugoton record label. It was produced by Parni Valjak guitarist Husein Hasanefendić "Hus", who also played guitar on several tracks. The album brought, alongside "Moja prva ljubav", which went on to become a major hit, slightly mystical and psychedelic songs "Radio", "Mijenjam se" ("I'm Changing"), "Tko je to" ("Who Is That"), "Duhovi" ("Ghosts"), "Crni žbir" ("Black Spy"), "Lice" ("Face") and "60–65." ("'60-'65"). "Lice" and Sacher's intimate and nostalgic song "60–65." later appeared in Adi Imamović's film Nemir (Unrest). The album should have featured the song "Radnička klasa odlazi u raj" ("The Working Class Goes to Heaven"), named after the 1971 film by Italian director Elio Petri. However, prior to the album release, Jugoton executives removed it from the album on the insistence of the Yugoslav Secretariat for Culture. The band's debut and their effective live appearances soon made them one of four most prominent bands of the Zagreb new wave scene, alongside Prljavo Kazalište, Azra and Film. On 15 May 1981, at the Music Biennale Zagreb, Haustor and Belgrade new wave band Šarlo Akrobata played as opening acts for the British band Gang of Four. At the end of 1981, Haustor released a 7-inch single with the songs "Zima" ("Winter"), "Majmuni i mesec" ("Monkeys and the Moon") and "Capri", the latter dedicated to their saxophonist Damir Prica "Capri".

Haustor's work on their second studio album was interrupted when part of the members was drafted to serve their mandatory stints in the Yugoslav People's Army in February 1982. The band had their last concert before the hiatus in Zagreb club Kulušić, with the concept of the performance envisioned as journey to the future.

==== Treći svijet and Sacher's departure (1983–1984) ====
The band continued their activity at the beginning of 1983, in the lineup featuring Rundek, Sacher, Prica, Gulić, and a new member, guitarist Zoran Zajec. With former Metak guitarist Željko Brodarić "Jappa" as the producer and with a brass section, the band recorded their second studio album Treći svijet (Third World), releasing it in 1983. The album was marked by their musical explorations, which ranged from reggae, over Latin American music to elements of pop. Rundek's lyrics were influenced by Biblical symbolism, various works of literature, adventure films and Hugo Pratt's comics. The songs "Neobičan dan" ("Unusual Day"), "Zadnji pogled na Jeršaleim" ("The Last Look at Yerushaláyim"), "Babilonske baklje" ("Torches of Babylon"), "Skriven iza lažnih imena" ("Hidden Behind False Names") and the title track brought a distinctive atmosphere which was novel to Yugoslav rock scene. The album also featured the song "Radnička klasa odlazi u raj", previously removed from the band's debut album by Jugoton executives. Despite the critical success of the album, the follow up tour was not very successful, and Saher and Prica left the band in 1984, forming the band Brojani (The Counted).

==== Rundek-led years and disbandment (1984–1990) ====
Logo used by the band since the release of their third album

The band's third album Bolero was recorded by Rundek, Prica and Zajec, with Gulić and Santro, although they had at the time already left the band, nevertheless taking part in the recording sessions. The bass guitar on the recording was played by Rundek, and on some tracks the band used rhythm machine. Other musicians who took part in the album recording were Jurij Novoselić (of the band Film, alt saxophone and keyboards), Rastko Milošev (of Parni Valjak, guitar), jazz musician Neven Frangeš (keyboards), with female members of the reggae band Naturalna Mistika (Natural Mystique) and actress Anja Šovagović recording backing vocals. The album also featured guest appearance by actor Rade Šerbedžija, who recited in the song "Take the Money and Run". The album was produced by Dragan Mačinović and Mitar Subotić. With all the songs written by Rundek, Bolero brought the second major hit in the band's career, the song "Ena", alongside successful "Šejn" ("Shane"), "Šal od svile" ("Silk Scarf"), "Ja želim" ("I Wish"), "TV Man", "Sejmeni" ("Seimeni") and "Take the Money and Run", the latter featuring elements of rap music. For the promotional tour, the band was rejoined by Gulić, Prica and Santro, with addition of bass guitarist Mario Barišin (formerly of Trobecove Krušne Peći), keyboardist Alen Bjelinski (formerly of Aerodrom) and trumpeter Igor Pavlica. In 1986, the band appeared on Zagreb Fest with the song "Samo na čas" ("Only for a Moment").

The album Tajni grad (Secret City) was recorded with two new members, bass guitarist Marino Pelajić (formerly of Film) and keyboardist Julije Rejić. Sacher appeared on the album as a guest, playing bass guitar in five songs. All the songs on the album were once again written by Rundek. The album was well received by music critics and the public, with the songs "Ula ulala", "Bi mogo da mogu" ("I Could if I Could"), "Uzalud pitaš" ("You Are Asking in Vain"), "Samo na čas" and "Uhode" ("Stalkers") becoming the audience's favorites.

In 1990, while in the midst of the recording of their fifth album, with the working title Dovitljivi mali čudaci (Quick-Witted Little Weirdos), the band suddenly ended their activity.

=== Post breakup: New activities by former members and posthumous releases ===
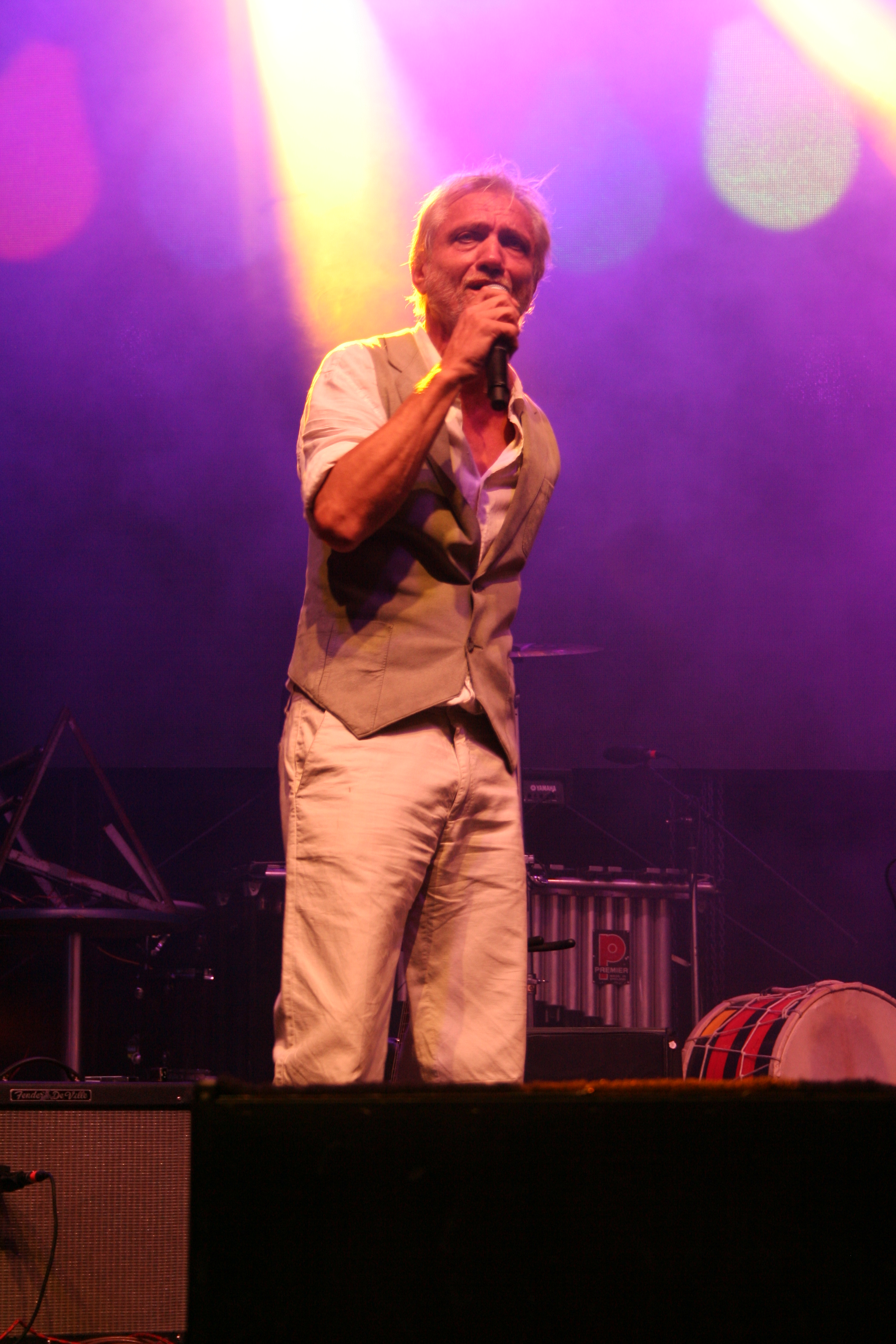
Darko Rundek performing in 2017. In the mid-1990s, Rundek started a highly successful career as a singer-songwriter.

After Haustor disbanded, Rundek moved with his family to Paris, starting a highly successful career of a singer-songwriter with the release of his 1996 album Apokalipso (Apocalypse). After his departure from Haustor, Sacher performed with the bands Brojani, Ayllu, Naturalna Mistika, and Dee Dee Mellow, before forming the successful band Vještice.

Prica performed with the band Duboko Grlo, (Deep Throat, named after the pornographic film of the same name), led by keyboardist Zoran Šilović. In 1986, Prica formed the free jazz band Cul-de-Sac (French for Dead End Street) with guitarist Dragan Pajić "Pajo". Cul-de-Sac held informal concerts, often performing in the street or in subway passages. During the band's initial run, a number of musicians performed with them, including Rundek (on guitar and bass guitar), Pavlica, hornist Neven Jurić, drummers Predrag Dubravčić and Ivan Marušić "Klif", and others. They released two albums, the live album The End... Some More (Part Four) and The End of the World and the Other Songs Including Hit Single, both in 1990. The band also recorded music for short animated films and for theatre plays Coccolemocco and Događanja (Events) by Kugla glumište theatre. In 1993, Prica and Pajić both moved to Amsterdam, where they reformed the band. In addition to working with Cul-de-Sac, Prica also performed with the avant-garde band Pink Noise Quartet, recording their 1999 self-titled album with them. He also composed music for the performance Nexus by artist Nataša Lušetić. In 2000, Pajić moved back to Zagreb, where he continued the activity of Cul-de-Sac, adding Orkestar za ubrzanu evoluciju (Orchestra for the Accelerated Evolution) to the band's name. Rundek, Pavlica, Neven Jurić, Andreja Košavić (vocal, trumpet), Miro Manojlović (vibraphone) and other musicians performed with the band on different occasions. Prica returned to Zagreb in 2013, joining the band Franz Kafka Ensemble and recording the album Circus Noir (2018) with them. The Cul-de-Sac double vinyl compilation L'Equipue Extraordinaire, released in 2019, featured studio recordings, as well as recordings from concerts and rehearsals made in 1986–2006 period.

Srđan Gulić joined the band Ritam S Ovoga Sveta (Rhythm of This World), recording the 1986 self-titled album with them. With Disciplina Kičme he recorded the 1991 album Nova iznenađenja za nova pokolenja (New Surprises for New Generations). He formed his band Gul Y Marlones de Brando, performing as the vocalist and the drummer with the group. The band released the album Osvježavajući plod (Refreshing Fruit) in 2006. He composed music for Antonio Nuić's 2009 film Donkey, receiving the Golden Arena for Best Film Music at the 2009 Pula Film Festival. He wrote opening songs for Croatian Radiotelevision children's TV shows Čarobna ploča (Magical Record) and Mišo i Robin (Mišo and Robin). With his son Pavle he started the project Gul United.

Pavlica performed with a number of artists, most prominently Darko Rundek Band, Jinx and Kawasaki 3P. Other former members of Haustor retired from music.

In 1995, Blind Dog Records and Dallas Records jointly released the live album Ulje je na vodi (Oil Is on the Water, named after a verse from "Moja prva ljubav"), featuring the recording of Haustor's performance held on 6 January 1982 in Zagreb club Kulušić. The performance featured guest appearances by Jurij Novoselić (saxophone) and Stanko Juzbašić (percussion). Beside the songs which appeared on the band's first two studio albums and 7-inch singles, Ulje je na vodi featured six songs which Haustor never recorded in studio. Despite low technical quality of the recordings, the album was reissued as a double vinyl release in 2019.

In 2015, Croatia Records released the box set Original Album Collection, featuring all four studio albums by the band. In 2017, the EP Dovitljivi mali čudaci was released, featuring five songs originally recorded for the never-finished fifth studio album – "Hiawatha", "Disanje" ("Breathing"), "Ista slika" ("The Same Picture"), "More, more" ("Sea, Sea") and "Señor".

=== 1996 and 2022 reunions ===
At the end of 1995, Rundek returned to Zagreb from Paris, holding a series of well-received concerts, with 10,000 visitors in total attending the performances. The good reception of the performances led to Haustor reuniting for a concert on the 1996 Zagreb gori (Zagreb's Burning) festival, in the lineup featuring Darko Rundek, Srđan Sacher, Zoran Zajec, Damir Prica, Nikola Santro and Igor Pavlica, with Boris Leiner and Ozren Štiglić performing as guests. Other guests on the concert were Robert Lovrić, Max Wilson and Jurij Novoselić's brother Sergej Novoselić on violin.

In 2021, Croatia Records reissued Haustor on vinyl. A year later, the label reissued Treći svijet on vinyl. For this occasion, the lineup which recorded the album, consisting of Rundek, Sacher, Prica, Gulić and Zajec, reunited to rework "Treći svijet" to the song "Trijeći svijet Dub 2022". Bolero was reissued on vinyl in 2023.

== Legacy ==
Serbian and Yugoslav reggae band Del Arno Band covered Haustor song "Treći svijet" on their 1995 album Reggaeneracija (Reggaeneration). Serbian crossover band Eyesburn recorded a successful cover of "Šejn" for the 1999 various artists album Korak napred 2 koraka nazad (A Step Forward 2 Steps Backwards). The songs "Moja prva ljubav" and "Ena" were covered on the 2001 album Yugoton, featuring Polish musicians' covers of songs by Yugoslav rock acts. "Ena" was also covered by Croatian band Postolar Tripper on their 2007 album Zamisli život u ritmu cipela za ples (Imagine a Life in the Rhythm of Dancing Shoes), and in French language by Bosnian band Jall aux Yeux in 2024, Rundek making a guest appearance on their version. Serbian Romani music band Kal covered "Mijenjam se" on their 2014 album Romologija (Romalogy). Croatian band Flyer covered "Radio" for the 2017 various artists album Zimzeleno a novo 3 (Evergreen But New 3).

All four studio albums by Haustor appeared on the list of 100 Greatest Albums of Yugoslav Popular Music in the 1998 book YU 100: najbolji albumi jugoslovenske rok i pop muzike (YU 100: The Best albums of Yugoslav pop and rock music): Treći svijet polled No. 20, Haustor polled No. 29, Bolero polled No. 39 and Tajni grad polled No. 45. All four albums also appeared on the 2015 list of 100 Greatest Yugoslav Albums published by the Croatian edition of Rolling Stone: Haustor was polled No. 4, Treći svijet was polled No. 8, Bolero was polled No. 35 and Tajni grad was polled No. 78.

In 2000, "Šejn" was polled No. 26, and "Moja prva ljubav" was polled No. 63 on the Rock Express Top 100 Yugoslav Rock Songs of All Times list. In 2006, "Šejn" was polled No. 2, "Ena" was polled No. 11, and "Moja prva ljubav" was polled No. 41 on the B92 Top 100 Domestic Songs list.

The lyrics of sixteen songs by the band, thirteen authored by Rundek, two authored by Sacher and one co-authored by Rundek and Sacher, were featured in Petar Janjatović's book Pesme bratstva, detinjstva & potomstva: Antologija ex YU rok poezije 1967 - 2007 (Songs of Brotherhood, Childhood & Offspring: Anthology of Ex YU Rock Poetry 1967 – 2007).

== Discography ==
=== Studio albums ===
- Haustor (1981)
- Treći svijet (1984)
- Bolero (1985)
- Tajni grad (1988)

=== Soundtrack albums ===
- Treći svijet (Soundtrack) (2025)

=== Live albums ===
- Ulje je na vodi (1995)

=== Extended plays ===
- Dovitljivi mali čudaci (2017)

=== Compilation albums ===
- 1981. 1984. 1985. 1988. (1995)
- The Ultimate Collection (2008)
- Greatest Hits Collection (2017)

=== Box sets ===
- Original Album Collection (2015)

=== Singles ===
- "Moja prva ljubav" / "Pogled u BB" (1981)
- "Radio" / "Crni žbir" (1981)
- "Majmuni i mjesec" / "Zima", "Capri" (1981)
- "Ena" / "Take the Money and Run" (1985)
- "Ula ulala" / "Skidaj se" (1988)
- "Ena" (BilloGorz Remix) (2023)
- "Treći svijet" (Dub 2025) (2025)
- "Neobičan dan" (Live, ZG Gori, 1996.) (2025)
