= Zdenka Vučković =

Croatian popular music singer (1942–2020)

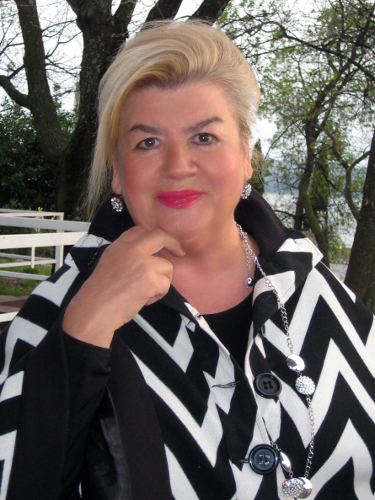

Zdenka Vučković (Zagreb, 20 June 1942 - 7 March 2020) was a Croatian popular music singer with a career spanning 60 years. Her popularity peaked during the 1960s, when she was a teen pop star. She is best remembered for the songs Moja mala djevojčica ["My Little Girl"], best known by the line Tata, kupi mi auto ["Daddy, Buy Me a Car"], and Zagreb, Zagreb, which became an unofficial anthem of the Croatian capital. According to a list of top five best Croatian songs of all time compiled by RTL television show Croatian Number One published in 2021 and taking in account week at number one on charts, number of sales and air time, "Mala djevojčica (Tata kupi mi auto)" ranked at number three. Her voice is made familiar by the song Zeko i potočić ["Bunny and the Stream"].

She announced the end of her career with the song Odrasla je djevojčica mala ["The Little Girl has Grown Up"] performed at the 1989 Zagreb Festival. However, in 1991, she performed the song "To Love Somebody" (a song by the Bee Gees in Croatian) in a duet with Severina. In 2010, she performed the song "Veslaj" ["Row!"] with Luka Nižetić at the Split Festival.

In 1971, she married composer Krešimir Oblak.
