= Omer beže =

Traditional song from Bosnia and Herzegovina

"Omer beže" (Bosnian for 'Oh, Omer Bey') is a traditional song (sevdalinka) from Bosnia and Herzegovina.

== Nada Mamula version ==
"Omer beže"

Single by Nada Mamula
- A-side: "Omer beže (both Jugoton and PGP RTB); Niz polje idu babo sejmeni (PGP RTB only)"
- B-side: "Oj Vrbasu, vodo ladna (Jugoton only) Sve behara i sve cvjeta Mene majka neguje i gleda"
- Released: 1958 (Jugoton); 1964 (PGP RTB)
- Genre: traditional

Mamula recorded this song both for Jugoton (1958) and PGP RTB (1964).

Darko Lukač played harmonica in Jugoton, while Žarko Milanović traditional orchestra played music in PGP version.

Many years later, Mamula filmed the video.

== Josipa Lisac version ==
"Omer beže"

Single by Josipa Lisac
- A-side: "Omer beže"
- B-side: "Niz polje idu babo"
- Released: February 1974
- Genre: traditional
- Label: Jugoton

Her version was released in 1974. Song was recorded in Sarajevo during early 1974.
