= Hir, hir, hir =

1980 studio album by Josipa Lisac

Hir, hir, hir (transl. Whim, whim, whim) is the fourth studio album by Croatian pop singer Josipa Lisac, released by Jugoton in 1980.

The song "Magla" became one of Josipa's biggest pop hits. It is to date very popular in former Yugoslavia.

== Track listing ==
Composed and written by Karlo Metikoš and Ivica Krajač.

1. Pazi, oštar pas (Take care, vicious dog)
2. Rendez-vous sa Sotonom (Date with Satan)
3. Magla (Fog)
4. Ne budi lud (Don't be crazy)
5. Mister Gaf (Mr. Embarrassment)
6. Make up
7. Knock down
8. Hir, hir, hir (Whim, whim, whim)
9. U mislima (In my mind)
