= Ruke =

Studio album by Darko Rundek
- Released: September 9, 2002
- Label: Menart

Darko Rundek chronology
U sirokom svijetu (2000)	Ruke (2002)	Mhm a-ha oh yeah da-da (2006)

Ruke (Hands) is third solo album by Darko Rundek. The album contains 12 songs, of which the hits are the title track, Makedo and Ista slika.

By the end of 2002, the album had sold 1,950 copies.

== Background ==
After the weak success of the previous album, Rundek released a book of poems in December 2001. At the end of September 2001, he participated in the project The Velvet Bananas with Gile from Električni orgazam, Zoran Predin from Lačni Franz and other singers.

In the year of the album's release, Rundek participated in a tribute album dedicated to Milan Mladenović with a cover of the song Ona se budi. In addition, he briefly collaborated with the dance singer Ivana Brkić.

== Album ==
The album was announced at the 2001 Exit festival as "less literary", that the following year he would admit that the original name was Barbarstvo pijanca ("Barbarism of the drunkard").

The album was released in September 2002 by Menart (Croatian market), Metropolis Records (FRY market) and two years later published by Pirahna from Germany. The album was accompanied by music videos for Makedo, Ista slika and Ruke. "Tigidigi rege" was re-released under the title "Tamni jorgovan" in October 2017.

The remastered version was released on CD and LP in October 2022. In April 2023, re-release of Ruke won Porin award for best thematic-historical album. Song Sjaj što izdaje, was originally written for The Three Men of Melita Žganjer, and music video was shot in October 2022.

== Reception ==
Vjesnik wrote that Rundek is in Zagreb's Tvronica kulture with a radically different repertoire and new musical collaborators from Paris with whom he recorded Ruke. Leaning towards improvisation from pre-arranged songs, they showed first of all a pleasure in playing together with a very clear departure from any convention.

Jutarnji list wrote that it is a sound that is different from the one we were used to until then: the rhythm shows a great variety of traditional percussion putting the usual rock style in the background, the accordion appears where the brass had a place, the atmosphere is very warm, it almost joins the acoustics of the cafe-concert, it magnificently includes real atmospheric sounds. In a further report it was written that the titles offered were powerful hits, at the crossroads of chanson and world music. It was also written that this album is the creative peak of Rundek and continues what was in the germ of Haustor in the 1980s.

Novi list of Rijeka wrote that the concert took place on the edge of experimental music, with magnificent improvisations, electronic loops and elements of jazz that took Rundek to a space quite far from his usual position: undoubtedly, extremely brave and original.

Vreme wrote that Ruke contains a sufficient number of previously known elements of Rundek's poetics to provide him with the so-called significant commercial success, adding album is pure European, without any American.

In his review for Slobodna Dalmacija, Zlatko Gall wrote about Rundek's trans-genre experience, more precisely about the mixture of motifs from the Balkans, the East and the Caribbean. Gall also reflected on the content of the album itself.

The Croatian portal Music Box wrote for a review on the occasion of the reissue that Rundek is sometimes not able to convey the charm of certain sections vocally, and his singing in French and Spanish somewhat resembles Štulić's English stunts. Unlike Johnny, Darko does it in moderation. For some it is magical. It's certainly not a dialect or accent that a native speaker will understand, but I don't think that was the author's goal either.
