= Haustor (album) =

- 1997 reissue cover

Studio album by Haustor
- Released: 1981
- Genres: New wave; rock
- Length: 34:04
- Language: Croatian
- Label: Jugoton
- Producer: Husein Hasanefendić

Haustor chronology
Haustor (1981)	Treći svijet (1984)

Singles from Haustor
- 1. "Moja prva ljubav" Released: 1981; 2. "Radio" / "Crni žbir" Released: 1981

Haustor is the first studio album of the Yugoslav rock group Haustor. It was released in 1981 under Jugoton.

== Content ==
The most popular song from this album is "Moja prva ljubav" (My first love). The verse "djevojke u ljetnjim haljinama volim" ("I love girls in summer dresses") is taken from the story "The Girls in Their Summer Dresses" by Irwin Shaw.

The album has been reissued three times. The first time was in 1997, the second time within the Original Album Collection box set and on vinyl on the occasion of 40 years of the Yugoslav new wave.

== Legacy ==
In 1998, the album was ranked 29 on the list of 100 albums of Yugoslav pop and rock music. In 2015, the Balkanrock portal ranked the artwork of the debut album in 5th place on the list of the 100 best Yugoslav rock album covers.

== Track listing ==
Side A
No.	Title	Lyrics	Music	Producer	Length
1.	"Radio"	Darko Rundek	Srđan Sacher	Husein Hasanefendić	2:53
2.	"Mijenjam se"	Sacher	Sacher	Hasanefendić	2:00
3.	"Tko je to"	Rundek	Sacher	Hasanefendić	2:09
4.	"'60–'65"	Sacher	Sacher	Hasanefendić	3:17
5.	"Moja prva ljubav"	Sacher	Sacher	Hasanefendić	5:25

Side B
No.	Title	Lyrics	Music	Producer	Length
6.	"Noć u gradu"	Sacher	Sacher	Hasanefendić	3:19
7.	"Crni žbir"	Rundek	Rundek	Hasanefendić	5:49
8.	"Duhovi"	Rundek; Gordana Labus	Rundek; Sacher; Ozren Štiglić	Hasanefendić	3:47
9.	"Lice"	Rundek	Rundek; Damir Prica	Hasanefendić	1:49

1997 reissue bonus tracks
No.	Title	Lyrics	Music	Producer	Length
10.	"Pogled u BB"	Sacher	Sacher	Hasanefendić	1:45
11.	"Majmun i mjesec"	Sacher	Sacher	Stanko Juzbašić	2:48
12.	"Zima"	Sacher	Sacher	Juzbašić	2:47
13.	"Capri"	Instrumental	Sacher	Juzbašić	2:03

== Charts ==
=== Weekly charts ===
Chart performance for Haustor
Chart (2021)	Peak position
Croatian Domestic Albums (HDU)	1

=== Monthly charts ===
Monthly chart performance for Haustor
Chart (2021)	Peak position
Croatian Vinyl Albums (HDU)	1

=== Year-end charts ===
Year-end chart performance for Haustor
Chart	Year	Position
Croatian Albums (HDU)	2021	1
Croatian Albums (HDU)	2022	8
Croatian Albums (HDU)	2023	24
