= O'Hara (band) =

Yugoslav rock band

Background information
- Origin: Zagreb, SR Croatia, SFR Yugoslavia
- Genres: Beat music; rock; pop rock
- Years active: 1965–1968; 1972
- Label: PGP-RTB
- Past members: Marcela Munger; Rajko Boltižar; Miljenko Ljubić; Frano Parać; Evbin Haramina; Josipa Lisac; Krešo Ivić; Dunja Dimić; Adonis Bozina; Ante Parat

O'Hara, also known as O'Hare (trans. The O'Haras) were a Yugoslav rock band formed in Zagreb in 1966. Although short-lived, the group was a prominent act of the 1960s Yugoslav rock scene, and, although they were not among the earliest Yugoslav rock bands, O'Hara–as other Yugoslav 1960s rock bands–played a pioneering role in the history of Yugoslav rock.

O'Hara gained prominence on the Yugoslav scene with songs influenced by The Seekers, The Hollies, and The Mamas & the Papas, written by the band's electric organist and leader Frano Parać. They gained further attention of the public with the arrival of vocalist Josipa Lisac. In 1968, Parać and Lisac joined Zlatni Akordi, O'Hare ending their activity. The group's original vocalist, Marcela Munger, and original guitarist, Rajko Boltižar, would reform O'Hara in 1972, the new incarnation of the band releasing only one single and disbanding shortly after.

== History ==
=== 1966–1968 ===
O'Hara was formed in 1965 in Zagreb. The first lineup consisted of Marcela Munger (vocals), Rajko Boltižar (guitar), Miljenko Ljubić (bass guitar), Frano Parać (organ) and Edvin Haramina (drums). There are two versions of the band's name origin: according to the first version, the group adopted the name from and American jazz group; according to the second, the name was an abbreviation from Haramina's last name. Initially the band performed covers of international rock hits, but gradually moved towards their own material, written and arranged by Parać. The band's sound featured The Seekers-, The Hollies- and The Mamas & the Papas-influenced polyphonic singing.

O'Hara gained the attention of the public soon after their formation with their performance on the competition of bands held in Zagreb club Kruge. In the autumn of 1966, they performed on the First Championship of Vocal and Instrumental Ensembles, held in Zagreb's Students' Cultural Center, entering the finals. Their songs "Halo taxi" ("Hello Taxi"), "Sunce sja za nas" ("The Sun Shines for Us") and "Lopov" ("The Thief") gained some local popularity, although they would remain unrecorded during the band's activity. The Yugoslav music press praised the band's performances, especially their polyphonic vocals, and in the spring of 1967 the group performed in Belgrade Youth Center, on the celebration of the first anniversary of the music magazine Džuboks. In May 1967, the band performed on the Second Championship of Vocal and Instrumental Ensembles, Marcela Munger winning the Best Female Vocalist Award. Soon after, she left the band, starting a short-lasting solo career. At the same time, Boltižar also left, and the two were replaced by vocalist Josipa Lisac and guitarist Krešo Ivić.

With the arrival of Lisac, the band started to turn away from polyphonic singing and to emphasize Lisac's vocals. The band appeared in the popular TV Belgrade show Koncert za ludi mladi svet (Concert for the Crazy Young World), performing covers of the songs "One Day" and "I Can't See Nobody". However, the second lineup was also short-lasting. In 1968, Lisac and Parać moved to Zlatni Akordi, and O'Hara ended their activity.

=== 1972 ===
In 1972, original vocalist Marcela Munger and original guitarist Rajko Boltižar reformed the band. The new incarnation of the band performed acoustic music and featured, besides Munger and Boltižar, Dunja Dimić, Adonis Bozina and Ante Parat. This lineup released O'Hara's only official release, the 7-inch single with the songs "572 itd" ("572 etc.") and "Sretna zemlja" ("Happy Land"), both written by Parać. Soon after the single release, they ended their activity.

=== Post breakup ===
In the years following her activity with O'Hare, Josipa Lisac started her solo career, eventually becoming one of the most prominent acts of the Yugoslav popular music scene.

After gaining formal education in the field of music theory and composition, Parać dedicated himself to classical music, eventually becoming the dean of the Zagreb Music Academy. In 1979, he was awarded with the prestigious Seven Secretaries of SKOJ Award for his work Ed e subito sera, followed by a number of awards. His composition "Olimpijski plamen" ("Olympic Flame") was performed on the opening of the 1984 Winter Olympics in Sarajevo. His most notable works include the ballet Carmina Krležiana (inspired by the works of writer Miroslav Krleža) and the opera Judita, the latter receiving numerous awards. He wrote music for a number of theatre plays. He was awarded with the Order of Danica Hrvatska with the Face of Marko Marulić for his contribution to Croatian culture. His works were issued on three albums, all three entitled Frano Parać, in 1986, 1993 and 2014 respectively.

== Discography ==
=== Singles ===
- "572 itd" / "Sretna zemlja" (1972)
