= Mirko Krstičević =

Croatian composer

Mirko Krstičević is a Croatian and Yugoslav musician and composer. Krstičević is known as the bass guitarist of the popular rock band Metak, as well as composer of classical, film and theatre music. He is the member of the Croatian Composers' Society and the Film Artists' Association of Croatia. He has composed a total of 38 hours of music and has sold a total of 3 million CDs.

== Career ==
=== With Metak ===
The group Metak (trans. Bullet) was formed in Split in the spring of 1978, on the initiative of Mirko Krstičević, who had previously performed with the band Che, and poet, journalist and lyricist Momčilo Popadić. The first lineup of the band included, beside Krstičević, vocalist and guitarist Ranko Boban and drummer Matko Jelavić. The three were soon joined by guitarist Željko Brodarić "Jappa", who would, after Boban's departure, also take over the vocal duties. After the arrival of Željko Brodarić's brother Zlatko Brodarić (guitar) and Doris Tomić (keyboards), the band recorded two successful albums, U tetrapaku (In Tetrapak, 1979) and Ratatatatija (1981). They disbanded at the end of 1981.

=== Career in popular music ===
Krstičević has composed 42 songs for various rock and pop artists. He has written arrangements for 150 songs and has produced 12 albums.

=== Career in classical, film and theatre music ===
Krstičević graduated from the Theory of Music at the Pedagogical Academy at Split and then at the Sarajevo Music Academy. He studied composition in the masterclasses of Mladen Pozajić and Miroslav Špiler. After graduating, Krstičević worked as a musical professor at the University of Split for a short period of time and later became a freelance artist.

He has composed 30 pieces of classical music, including pieces for solo instruments, chamber and symphonic music. He has composed two operas, Blood Wedding (1997) and Halugica (1999), and the opéra-ballet Dan'zor – Atlantis: A Legend of Dan’zor (2018).Atlantis on YouTube

He has composed music for 130 theatre plays, 45 films, one children's television show and two children's musicals.

=== Other activities ===
From 2000 to 2008 he cooperated with the Tourist Board of Split on the project Musical City Squares, inventing and organizing around one hundred musical and cultural events a year.

From 2004 to 2007 he was the secretary of the Split Philharmonic Society. In 2007 he established the Split Society for Contemporary Music and the project SPLITHESIS, which gathers seven composers of contemporary music from Split, twelve musicians and a conductor.

In 2015 he established the Highway to Well Family project, with the purpose to spread the gospel through music.

== Awards ==
- Croatian Academy of Sciences and Arts Charter and the SLUK Award for the Best Music for puppet opera Halugica (1999)
- Slobodna Dalmacija Special Award for the Arts (2010)
- Silvije Bombardelli Award for Exceptional Contribution to the Croatian Art of Composing Contemporary Music (2013)
