= Dnevnik jedne ljubavi =

Studio album by Josipa Lisac
- Released: 28 February 1973
- Recorded: February 1973
- Genre: Pop, rock
- Label: Jugoton
- Producer: Karlo Metikoš

Josipa Lisac chronology
Dnevnik jedne ljubavi (1973)	Najveći uspjesi '68./ '73. (1974)

Dnevnik jedne ljubavi (Croatian for 'The Diary of One Love') is the debut album by Croatian singer Josipa Lisac. It was released on 28 February 1973 through Jugoton. Lisac's partner Karlo Metikoš served as the sole composer, and Ivica Krajač served as the sole lyricist. Metikoš and Krajač dedicated the album to Lisac, as the first letters of each song's opening lyric form an acrostic with her name.

Dnevnik jedne ljubavi is considered of the best concept albums of Croatian pop rock and is often cited as a classic of the scene.

The album was polled in 1998 as 9th on the list of the 100 greatest Yugoslav rock and pop albums in the book YU 100: najbolji albumi jugoslovenske rok i pop muzike (YU 100: The best albums of Yugoslav pop and rock music).

The first digitally remastered version of the album was released on 25 December 2009 through Croatia Records. In February 2023, the album was released as a special edition vinyl with half speed remastered material at Abbey Road Studio in London.

== Commercial performance ==
The album received a gold certification for 25,000 copies sold in Yugoslavia.

After the release of the 2023 special edition, the album re-entered the Croatians Albums Chart at number 37 on the chart issue of 8 February 2023. Two weeks later the album would climb to the top position becoming Lisac's first number one album in over six years.

== Track listing ==
All music composed by Karlo Metikoš; all lyrics written by Ivica Krajač.

1. "O jednoj mladosti" ("About the Youth")
2. "Srela sam se s njim" ("I Met Up with Him")
3. "Sreća" ("Happiness")
4. "Po prvi put" ("For the First Time")
5. "Plačem" ("I'm Crying")
6. "Jedna kratka vijest" ("One Short Message")
7. "Ležaj od suza" ("Bed of Tears")
8. "Ne prepoznajem ga" ("I Don't Recognise Him")
9. "Vjerujem ti sve" ("I Believe You Everything")
10. "Kao stranac" ("Like a Stranger")

== Charts ==
Chart performance for Dnevnik jedne ljubavi
Chart (2023)	Peak position
Croatian Domestic Albums (HDU)	1

== Release history ==
Release formats for Dnevnik jedne ljubavi
Country	Date	Format	Version	Label	Ref.
Various	28 February 1973	Vinyl	Standard	Jugoton	
Various	25 December 2009	Digital download; streaming; vinyl; CD	Standard remaster	Croatia Records	
Various	3 February 2023	Vinyl	Special remaster	Croatia Records	
