= Tajni grad =

Studio album by Haustor
- Released: October 1988
- Recorded: March 1988
- Studio: J.M. Sound Studio (Zagreb, SR Croatia, SFR Yugoslavia)
- Genre: Rock
- Language: Croatian
- Label: Jugoton
- Producer: Darko Rundek; Hrvoje Hegedušić; Zoran Zajec

Haustor chronology
Bolero (1985)	Tajni grad (1988)	1981. 1984. 1985. 1988.; (1995)

Singles from Tajni grad
- 1. "Ula ulala" / "Skidaj se" Released: 1988

Tajni grad (English: Secret Town) is the fourth studio album by Yugoslav and Croatian group Haustor. The album was released in 1988 by Jugoton. The biggest hits from this album are "Skidaj se", "Samo na čas" (in a completely different arrangement), "Ula ulala" and "Uzalud pitaš".

After this album, Rundek directed a play called No, and Haustor broke up.

== Background ==
In 1986, the group performed at Zagrebfest with the song "Samo na čas". In the same year, Rundek participates in the album Mnoge smo i mnoge voljeli by Rade Šerbedžija.

For the second channel of Radio Zagreb, he directed the radio comedy Nema povišice, radio drama version of Antigone by Sophocles, etc.

== Album ==
In December 1987, the group began working on a new album. Album was recorded in March 1988 in Zagreb. The album is the result of the reduction of earlier ideas. The concept of the album is a mixture of ethno-rock, jazz etc.

Year later, Rundek directed documentary radio drama under same name for Radio Zagreb. Theme of radio drama is production of Tajni grad.

== Legacy ==
The album was ranked 45th out of the 100 best albums of Yugoslav pop and rock music in 1998. In 2015, it was ranked 78th out of the 100 best Yugoslav rock albums from 1955 until 2015 by the Croatian version of Rolling Stone.

== Charts ==
Chart performance for Tajni grad
Chart (2025)	Peak position
Croatian Domestic Albums (HDU)	1

== See also ==
- List of number-one albums of 2025 (Croatia)
