= Sanjati =

Studio album by Crvena jabuka
- Released: March 5, 1988
- Recorded: December 1987 – January 1988
- Studios: Rockoko Studio, Bošnjaci
- Genre: Pop
- Length: xx:yy
- Label: Jugoton
- Producer: Nikša Bratoš

Crvena jabuka chronology
Za sve ove godine (1987)	Sanjati (1988)	Tamo gdje ljubav počinje (1989)

Sanjati is the third studio album by the Sarajevo-based Bosnian pop rock band Crvena Jabuka. It was released in March 1988. In the ex-Yugoslavian territory it sold over 250,000 copies.

== Background ==
Following the mediocre performance of their previous release, Crvena Jabuka (English: Red Apple) took a year off as a year of silence for the two late members they lost in the last quarter of 1986. During this time, many fans wondered if the band would ever reform, or if it was just a one-off band that would be remembered for the first two albums they released.

In early 1988, Zlatko Arslanagić elected to reform the rest of the band. After a lengthy search, it was decided that Dražen Žerić, who provided backing vocals on the debut album, should take the role as lead singer (Žerić sang lead vocals on all 12 tracks of the previous album, which was recorded in haste).

This would not be the only change to happen to the band. Crvena Jabuka decided to move to a studio in Makarska where they still record today. They also appointed Travnik-born Niksa Bratos who was guitarist in Valentino, another ex-Yugoslavian band. Bratos was a multi-instrumentalist although he only handled production duties on this record and did not achieve full-time membership status until the next album.

When Sanjati was released, over the next few weeks it quickly went on to sell about 250,000 copies resulting in a massive hit (in Yugoslavia). Because of the extreme commercial success, the band embarked on a tour over the summer and fall, their first ever. The tour had them playing in venues across most of Yugoslavia. Because there was not adequate manpower, the band appointed Srdjan Serbedjija on bass (he played on most of the record) and keyboardist Zlatko Volarevic-Dilajla, thus bringing the group back up to a quintet.

Sanjati brought back a lot of the sound from their debut album. The group earned a string of hits and also some minor hits. Critics even constantly praised the band for the excellent and refined sound.

== Track listing ==
All tracks were written by Zlatko Arslanagić.

1. "Zovu nas ulice"
2. "Ne daj na sebe"
3. "Ti znaš"
4. "Oči su se navikle na mrak"
5. "Sviđa mi se ova stvar"
6. "Ljeta koja dolaze"
7. "Ima nešto od srca do srca"
8. "Malo ćemo da se kupamo"
9. "Zvona zvone"
10. "Vozovi prolaze"
11. "Na dlanu mi piše"
12. "Sanjati"

== Personnel ==
- Dražen Žerić - main vocals
- Zlatko Arslanagić - guitar
- Darko Jelčić - drums, percussion
- Branko Salka - bass guitar
- Zlatko Voralević - keyboards, other programming
