= Nemir (film) =

Nemir is a 1982 Croatian film directed by Ahmet "Adi" Imamović, starring Asja Jovanović, Igor Galo, Mladen Budišćak and Vera Zima.
