= Apokalipso =

Studio album by Darko Rundek
- Released: December 1996
- Genre: calypso, rock
- Label: Jabukaton

Darko Rundek chronology
Apokalipso (1996)	U širokom svijetu (2000)

Apokalipso (Apocalypso) is the first solo album of Croatian singer Darko Rundek. The album contains 12 songs, of which the title track and Señor are hits. The name itself comes from the words apocalypse and calypso. The album was released at the transition from 1996 to 1997.

== Background ==
After the breakup of Haustor in the early 90s, Rundek moved to Paris because his wife and then newborn son lived there. In Berlin, he receives the Ake Blomström Award.

During the war, he was a music editor at the Radio Brod station. The radio began with an experimental program on April 7, 1993 in order to start the regular program on June 1st of the same year. On February 28 of the following year, the broadcast of the program was canceled, and then it returned to the air for a short time in early March. Many newspapers around the world, including The Observer and Newsweek, wrote about Brod's work.

After the interruption of the broadcasting of Radio Brod, he gave an interview to Vreme zabave, a monthly supplement of the weekly magazine Vreme.

In late 1995, Haustor released compilation album 1981, 1984, 1985, 1988 and had a concert during Fiju Briju Festival. A few months later, Haustor performs at the festival Zagreb Gori. On October 5, 1996, the play "Apokalipso" premiered.

== Album ==
The title track was performed for the first time in 1995 at Fiju Briju Festival in Zagreb. The album contains songs mostly inspired by calypso music, but it also has rock motifs. It was recorded in Paris and Zagreb during 1995 and 1996.

The album was awarded with Porin for Song of the Year, Hit of the Year, Best Male Vocal Performance and Best Video. Album also won four Black Cat awards.

== Track listing ==
No.	Title	Length
1.	"Apokalipso"
2.	"Tranzit"
3.	"Uajdalalaj"
4.	"More, more"
5.	"Štrajk željezničara"
6.	"Šuvar i varivo"
7.	"Crni Dusi"
8.	"Señor"
9.	"Old boy"
10.	"Grane smo na vjetru"
11.	"Za nas"
12.	"Theme 58"
