= Za sve ove godine =

Studio album by Crvena Jabuka
- Released: March 30, 1987
- Recorded: November 1986 – January 1987
- Studios: Tetrapak Studio, Split
- Genre: Pop rock
- Length: Not Known
- Label: Jugoton
- Producer: Željko "Jappa" Brodarić

Crvena Jabuka chronology
Crvena Jabuka (1986)	Za sve ove godine (1987)	Sanjati (1988)

Za sve ove godine is the second studio album by the Sarajevo-based Bosnian pop rock band Crvena Jabuka, released in 1987. It is a tribute album to Drazen Ricl-Zijo and Aljosa Buha who had died the year before.

== Background ==
Crvena Jabuka began working on this album over the summer of 1986, a while before their first concert and the tragic incident. In that time, Ricl and rhythm guitarist/primary lyricist Zlatko Arslanagic had a few demos of some potential songs to appear on the album. The demos were leaked online in the last quarter of 2011 - twenty-five years to the day when the two aforementioned members died. The album also had a working name of "Uzmi me Kad Hoces Ti" (Take me When You Want To), which in the end was recycled for their first live album in 1990.

On 18 September 1986, the band headed out to what would be their first promotional concert. However, in Jablanica, on the border with Mostar where their show was scheduled, Aljosa Buha was killed in a traffic accident involving a truck that made head-on contact with Arslanagic's car. Ricl was transferred to a Belgrade hospital where he died about two weeks later.

Having almost thrown the album together, the three remaining members of the band elected to go in and finish up the material rather than shelving it. The group re-used Zeljo Brodaric-Jappa, whom they appointed to produce their debut album the year before and worked in an old studio in Split. To make up for the fact that there were only three members now, Drazen Zeric, who contributed backing vocals to the debut record, contributed main vocals as he would on every subsequent album, and Zlatko Arslanagic played some bass in addition to guitar.

The songs on this album are much simpler, mellow, ballads since it is a tribute album. Although there are certain peppy numbers like the title track, "Otrov," (Poison), "Ako ako," (If, if), and "Jedina," (The Only One), there are also darker, more melancholy tunes such as "Uzmi me Kad Hoces Ti," "Tugo Nesreco," and "Umrijet cu Nocas od Ljepote."

The album was also not as well received as their debut album possibly due to it being a tribute album. The trio elected not to do any promotion, advertisements, or even a tour, which could also explain why this album didn't sell as well as their other albums did.

== Track listing ==
No.	Title	Lyrics	Music	Length
1.	"Otrov" ("Poison")	Z. Arslanagić		3:19
2.	"Tugo, Nesrećo" ("Sadness, Misfortune")		D. Ričl	3:14
3.	"Za Sve Ove Godine" ("For all these years")	Z. Arslanagić		3:47
4.	"Dođi Kod Mene" ("Come to me")	Z. Arslanagić, D. Ričl	D. Ričl	2:37
5.	"Nema Više Vremena" ("There is no more time")	Z. Arslanagić		2:54
6.	"Umrijeću Noćas Od Ljepote" ("Tonight I will die from beauty")	Z. Arslanagić		3:17
7.	"Ako, Ako" ("If, if")	Z. Arslanagić		3:30
8.	"Uzmi Me (Kad Hoćeš Ti)" ("Take me (When you want it)")	Z. Arslanagić		3:35
9.	"Hajde, Hajde De, Opusti Se" ("Come on, Come on, Relax")	Z. Arslanagić	Z. Arslanagić, D. Žerić	3:20
10.	"Da Je Samo Malo Sreće" ("There is only little luck")	D. Ričl		3:40
11.	"Jedina" ("She, the only one")	Z. Arslanagić		3:36
12.	"Osim Tebe (Ljubavi)" ("Except you (My love)")	Z. Arslanagić		1:57

== Personnel ==
- Darko Jelčić - drums, percussion
- Dražen Žerić - bass, keyboards, recorder, melodica, songwriting, vocals
- Zlatko Arslanagić - guitar, percussion, bass, backing vocals, songwriting
