= Delfini (Split band) =

Yugoslav band (1963–1979)

- Also known as: Dupini
- Origin: Split, SR Croatia, SFR Yugoslavia
- Genres: Beat music; rock; pop; soul
- Years active: 1963–1979
- Labels: PGP-RTB, Jugoton
- Past members: Željko Šoletić; Zdravko Botrić; Saša Lukić; Ante Cetinić; Damir Blažević; Peco Petej; Pavle Kolarov; Igor Lučer; Tonči Puharič; Tonči Della Zotta; Silvije Petričić; Kamenko Tulić; Goran Franjić "Njoko"; Aljoša Draganić Vrančić

Delfini (trans. The Dolphins) were a Yugoslav band formed in Split in 1963. They were one of the pioneers of the Yugoslav rock scene.

In the 1960s the band performed beat music, gaining a reputation as one of the best Yugoslav beat bands, owing to which they started to perform as backing band for a number of popular Yugoslav singers. In the late 1960s they moved towards pop sound. They continued their career as a pop band throughout the 1970s, disbanding at the end of the decade, making occasional reunions during the following decades.

== History ==
=== 1963–1979 ===
Delfini were formed in Split in 1963, initially performing on hotel terraces in Split and other neighboring towns on the Adriatic shore. The band went through several lineup changes before a firm lineup was formed: Željko Šoletić (vocals), Zdravko Botrić (guitar), Saša Lukić (keyboards), Ante Cetinić (bass guitar) and Damir Blažević (drums). Blažević was soon replaced by Peco Petej (who would in the 1970s perform in the bands Time and Indexi). During the initial phase of their career, the band enjoyed assistance from Petej's father, renowned opera singer Andrej Petej. On their early performances, the band was occasionally joined by female vocalist Meri Cetinić, who would later gain fame as a solo artist.

The band gained attention of the Yugoslav public with their appearance on a concert in Croatian National Theatre in Split organized by the Association of Musicians of Split. In 1964, the band performed on a series of concerts entitled Prvi pljesak (The First Applause), organized by Mozaik (Mosaic) Society for Culture and Arts. They spent the summer of 1964 performing in Palas hotel on the island of Hvar. After their return to their home city, they held their first solo concert, on which they performed with saxophonist Igor Lučer and trumpeter Tonči Puharič. Following this performance, the band started to hold regular concerts in the cellars of Diocletian's Palace in Split, with up to 1,500 spectators per performance. The band would perform in the Palace cellars throughout 1965 and 1966. Owing to their live performances and the fact that all of the members had formal music education, Delfini gained the reputation as one of the best Yugoslav beat bands, which gave them the opportunity to perform during 1965 as backing band for a number of popular Yugoslav singers: Arsen Dedić, Ivica Šerfezi, Lado Leskovar, Zdenka Vučković, Ana Štefok, Vice Vukov and others. In the mid-1960s the band was joined by new guitarist, Pavle Kolarov.

In 1966, the band applied for the Melodije Jadrana 66 (Melodies of the Adriatic 66) music festival with the song "More i ljeto" ("Sea and Summer"), composed by Lukić. Delfini wanted to perform the song themselves, but the festival organizers opted the song to be performed by a female vocalist, with singer Maruška Šinković ending up performing it. Delfini were offered to appear on the festival performing the song "Ča se noćas svitli luka" ("Why Is the Harbor So Bright This Evening"), which they refused. This event gained large attention of the media and the public support for the band by some popular singers. In 1967, the band signed a contract with Split tourist company Primorje (Seashore). The intention of the company was to create the city summer garden on a devastated field, and Delfini were hired to perform at the location. After the garden was opened, it became the gathering place for the Split youth, with Delfini performing there every evening from 8:00 pm to 23:30 pm, with 1,000 to 1,500 people visiting each of their performances. In 1967, the band competed on the second edition of the Belgrade Gitarijada Festival, winning the second place, behind Crni Biseri. The band would also compete on the second edition of the Festival of Vocal-Instrumental Ensembles in Zagreb, held on 14 May 1967, where they also won the second place, behind Kameleoni. On the 1967 Split Festival, they performed the song "Beat na moru" ("Beat on the Seashore"), a Serbo-Croatian version of the song "Running Out of the World", performed on the same festival by the British band The Shadows. "Beat na moru" was released on the festival official EP Split '67, becoming a hit for Delfini.

At the beginning of 1968, the band relocated to the country's capital Belgrade, in the effort to gain nationwide popularity. They held 11 concerts in Belgrade Youth Center, and soon gained an opportunity to appear in the popular TV show Koncert za mladi ludi svet (Concert for Young Crazy World) and were offered a contract by the PGP-RTB record label. In 1968, they released their debut record, the EP Naša serenada (Our Serenade). On the EP, the band was signed as Dalmatinski Delfini (The Dalmatian Dolphins), owing to the fact another Yugoslav band named Delfini released their debut EP one year earlier. All four songs on Naša serenada were authored by the band members, which rarely happened at the time, as 1960s Yugoslav rock bands would usually include covers of foreign rock hits on their records. The title track featured elements of folk music of Dalmatia, while the song "Sedam koraka" ("Seven Steps") featured elements of Macedonian traditional music. The song "Dioklecijan" ("Diocletian") was co-written by Toma Bebić (who would later gain fame as a singer-songwriter). This song is notable as the first song in the history of Yugoslav rock music to feature the technique of backmasking.

After the EP release, the band would start to move away from rock towards Yugoslav pop scene. However, they also included a number of soul songs into their repertoire, and were joined by two new members, saxophone player Igor Lučer and trumpet player Tonči Puharič, both of which previously appearing on the band's concerts as guests. In the following years they moved back to Split and played as a backing band for a number of singers, performed on fashion shows and often appeared on Radio Belgrade and Radio Zagreb. In the 1970s, they got a new singer, Tonči Della Zotta. During the decade, they released a number of pop-oriented 7" singles, often appeared on Yugoslav pop festivals, held a number of performances in Italy and seventeen tours across the Soviet Union and five tours across the United States and Canada. They ended their activity at the end of the decade.

=== Reunions ===
Since the beginning of the 1990s, the band have occasionally reunited under the name Dupini (also meaning The Dolphins in Croatian) in different lineups featuring, alonsgide members of the original incarnation of the group, Silvije Petričić (guitar), Kamenko Tulić "Kame" (drums), Goran Franjić "Njoko" (bass guitar) and Aljoša Draganić Vrančić (keyboards, vocals). As the band had spent a number of years performing as the backing band for popular singer Oliver Dragojević, in 2004, they recorded the album Tragom Olivera (Following Oliver's Footsteps), featuring instrumental versions of Dragojević's songs.

In 2014, the members of the band's 1960s lineup reunited to hold several concerts in Croatia.

Aljoša Draganić Vrančić died on 21 August 2021 from COVID-19.

== Discography ==
=== Studio albums ===
- Tragom Olivera (2004)

=== EPs ===
- Naša serenada (1968)

=== Compilation albums ===
- Hitovi (1984)
- Hitovi II (1988)

=== Singles ===
- "Kako je toplo ovo ljeto" / "Mini-bikini" (1973)
- "Tonbula" / "Dobro jutro, draga" (1976)
- "Od portuna do portuna" / "Radio i mikrofon" (1977)
- "Od ponedjeljka novi život" / "Intima" (1979)
- "Čobanica" / "Srce samo jednom voli" (1979)
- "Prijateljstvo" / "Natanijel" (1979)

=== Other appearances ===
- "Beat na moru" (Split '67, 1967)
