= Regata =

Yugoslav rock band

- Original Regata lineup in 1984

Background information
- Origin: Zagreb, SR Croatia, SFR Yugoslavia
- Genres: Hard rock; arena rock; power pop
- Years active: 1979–1986
- Labels: Jugoton, PGP-RTB, Croatia Records
- Past members: Nikola Gečević; Dario Kumerle; Željko Turčinović; Tomislav Šojat; Gordan Milas; Dražen Kovač; Alan Kolar; Dragan Kokanović; Zoran Kranjec; Krešimir Oreški

Regata (transl. Regatta) was a Yugoslav rock band formed in Zagreb in 1983. Led by guitarist and vocalist Nikola "Koce" Gečević, Regata is best known for the 1983 hit song "Andrea".

== History ==
Regata was formed in 1983 by Nikola "Koce" Gečević (vocals, guitar), Dario Kumerle (bass guitar) and Željko Turčinović (drums), the three choosing the name for the band after The Police album Reggatta de Blanc. Gečević was in the late 1970s guitarist for the band Drugi Način. After leaving Drugi Način in 1980, he formed the band Žuta Minuta (Yellow Minute, the name of the band being a Serbo-Croatian expression for the moments of uncontrolled rage). Beside Kečević, Žuta Minuta featured guitarist Branko Bogunović, formerly of the bands Drugi Način and Obećanje Proljeća (Promise of the Spring), bass guitarist Hrvoje Grčević and drummer Ante Gečević, the group splitting up after the release of their only album Hej vi!!! (Hey You!!!) in 1981.

Regata released their debut album, entitled Noćna regata (Night Regatta), in 1984 through Jugoton record label. The album was produced by Željko Brodarić "Jappa", who also sang backing vocals on the album recording, and featured the cover designed by prominent artist Mirko Ilić. Tha album brought hard rock sound with macho lyrics, the song "Andrea" becoming a nationwide hit. By the time of the recording of the second album, Gečević had remained the only original member of the band, with the lineup consisting of him, Tomislav Šojat (bass guitar), Gordan Milas (keyboards) and Dražen Kovač (drums). Regata's second album, Spavaj mi vještice (Sleep, My Witch), released in 1986 through PGP-RTB, was stylistically similar to their debut. It was, as the previous album, produced by Brodarić and featured Brodarić on lead vocals in the song "Zbogom pameti" ("Farewell, Mind"). The band's third album, Obuzdaj nagone (Restrain You Urges), was recorded in the lineup featuring Nikola Gečević, Alan Kolar (vocals), Dragan Kokanović (bass guitar), Zoran Kranjec (keyboards) and Krešimir Oreški (drums). The album was released in 1990 through Jugoton and saw very little attention of the Yugoslav audience and the media, and the band ended their activity soon after.

=== Post breakup ===
Gečević recorded an album of instrumental covers of The Beatles songs, entitled The Beatles Instrumental, released in 1990. In 1992, Croatia Records released Regata compilation album Odabrano 1981 – 1992 (Chosen Works 1981–1992).

== Legacy ==
Serbian and Yugoslav rock singer Viktorija recorded a cover of "Andrea" on her 2000 album Nostalgija (Nostalgia).

== Discography ==
=== Studio albums ===
- Noćna regata (1984)
- Spavaj mi vještice (1986)
- Obuzdaj nagone (1990)

=== Compilations ===
- Odabrano 1981 – 1992 (1992)

=== Singles ===
- "Andrea" / "Za tebe" (1984)
