= Neno Belan =

Croatian singer-songwriter

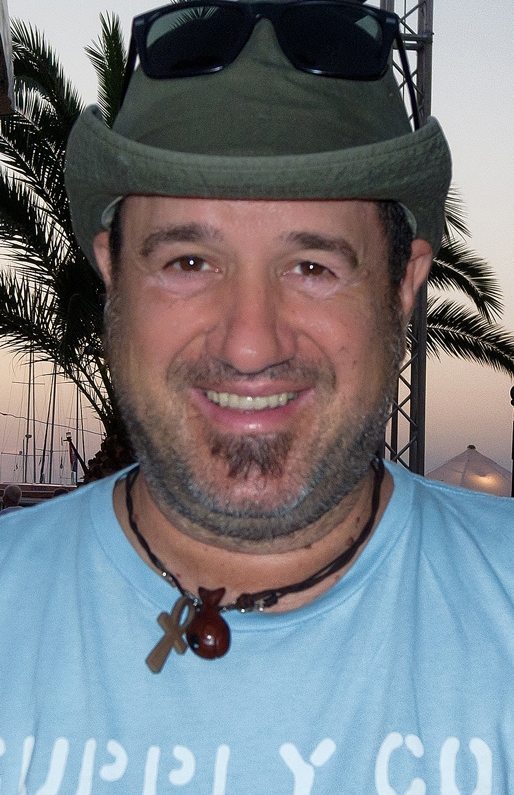
- Belan in Mali Lošinj, July 2013

Background information
- Born: Nenad Belan; 2 February 1962 (age 64); Split, PR Croatia, Yugoslavia (now Croatia)
- Genres: Rock; rock and roll; pop rock
- Occupations: Singer; songwriter
- Instruments: Vocals; guitar
- Years active: 1970s–present
- Labels: Jugoton; Dallas Records; Croatia Records; Aquarius Records

Nenad "Neno" Belan (born 2 February 1962) is a Croatian rock musician known as the frontman of Đavoli, as well as for his solo work.

== Biography ==
=== Early career ===
Neno Belan started his career as a teenager in the band Losos, Kavijar i Marsovi Bizoni (Salmon, Caviar and Bisons from Mars). In 1980, he became a member of the band Narodno Blago (National Treasure) which performed rhythm and blues and occasionally performed as the supporting band for Split punk rock musician Fon Biškić, with whom they performed covers of The Rolling Stones, Ramones and The Clash songs. Narodno Blago disbanded in 1983, and Belan became the member of the band Aquilla. The band performed Dalmatian folk songs, and Belan played mandolin.

=== Đavoli and solo career ===
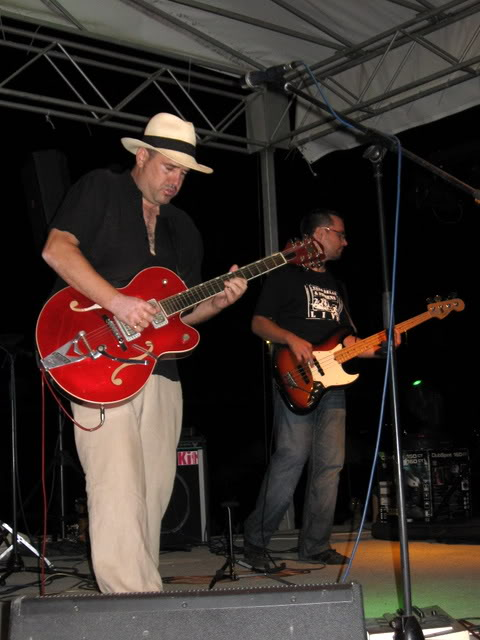
Belan (on the left) performing with Fiumens in Novi Sad

In 1984, Belan formed the band Đavoli (The Devils), which performed music inspired by the 1950s rock and roll. The band successfully performed until 1991. In 1991, Belan released his first solo record, EP Rock galama (Rock Noise), recorded with the members of Đavoli. In 1991, Đavoli disbanded due to the outbreak of Yugoslav Wars, and 1991 Split Festival, where Belan and Anja Šovagović-Despot were scheduled to perform the song "Ljubav postoji zbog nas", was canceled. Belan appeared at the Split Festival in 1992 performing song "Zaboravi". In 1993, he released his first solo album, Vino noći (Night Wine). The album vas recorded with members of Daleka Obala. Vino noći featured hits "Zaboravi", "Sunčan dan" (written by Zdravko Bajan, a former member of Narodno Blago), "A gdje si ti?" and "Ljubav postoji zbog nas" (previously unreleased duet with Anja Šovagović-Despot). The album also featured English language versions of "Vino noći" and "Sunčan dan". In 1994, he released EP Mama (Mum), and the title track was a candidate for the Croatian representative at the 1994 Eurovision Song Contest. The EP also featured songs "Beat na moru" (a cover of the 1960s Delfini hit) and "Ne pitaj za nju" (a duet with Tony Cetinski).

During the 1990s, Belan performed mostly abroad, while in Croatia he appeared mostly at music festivals. In 1995, he released pop-oriented album Dolazi ljubav (Love Is Coming). On the tour that followed the album release he was followed by the bass guitarist Olja Dešić and the drummer Leo Rumora. In 1997, he released the album Južnjačka utjeha (Southern Comfort). The album featured a cover of The Vibrators' "Baby Baby" (Belan's version entitled "Lezi, baby") and a cover of Bob Dylan's "Blowin' in the Wind" (Belan's version entitled "Odgovor u vjetru").

In 1998, Belan reunited Đavoli when Vedran Križan joined the band as the keyboardist, thus finished the gathering of the group, soon to be known as "Fiumens", but not before they tried to revive old "Đavoli" brand so the band released the album Space Twist. However, Đavoli disbanded once again, and Neno, Olja, Leo, and Vedran formed the band Neno Belan & Fiumens, and they released albums Luna & Stelle in 2002 and Rijeka snova (The River of Dreams) in 2007 as Neno Belan & Fiumens, as well as "Dream factory" in 2009, double CD, live from "Tvornica" (factory), for which they got many discography awards in Croatia (Porin).

== Discography ==
=== Đavoli ===
==== Studio albums ====
- Ljubav i moda (1986)
- Hallo Lulu 22 (1987)
- Ostani uz mene (1988)
- Space Twist (1998)

==== Compilations ====
- Balade – Kad se nađem u predjelu noći... (1989)
- The Ultimate Collection – Neno Belan & Đavoli (Croatia Records, 2008)

=== Solo ===
==== Studio albums ====
- Vino noći (1993)
- Dolazi ljubav (1995)
- Južnjačka utjeha (1997)

==== EPs ====
- Rock galama (as Neno Belan & Đavoli, 1991)
- Mama (1994)

=== Neno Belan & Fiumens ===
==== Studio albums ====
- Luna & Stelle (2002)
- Rijeka snova (2007)
- Oceani ljubavi (2011)
- Sanjaj! (2016)
