= Darko Rundek =

Croatian singer-songwriter, poet, and actor

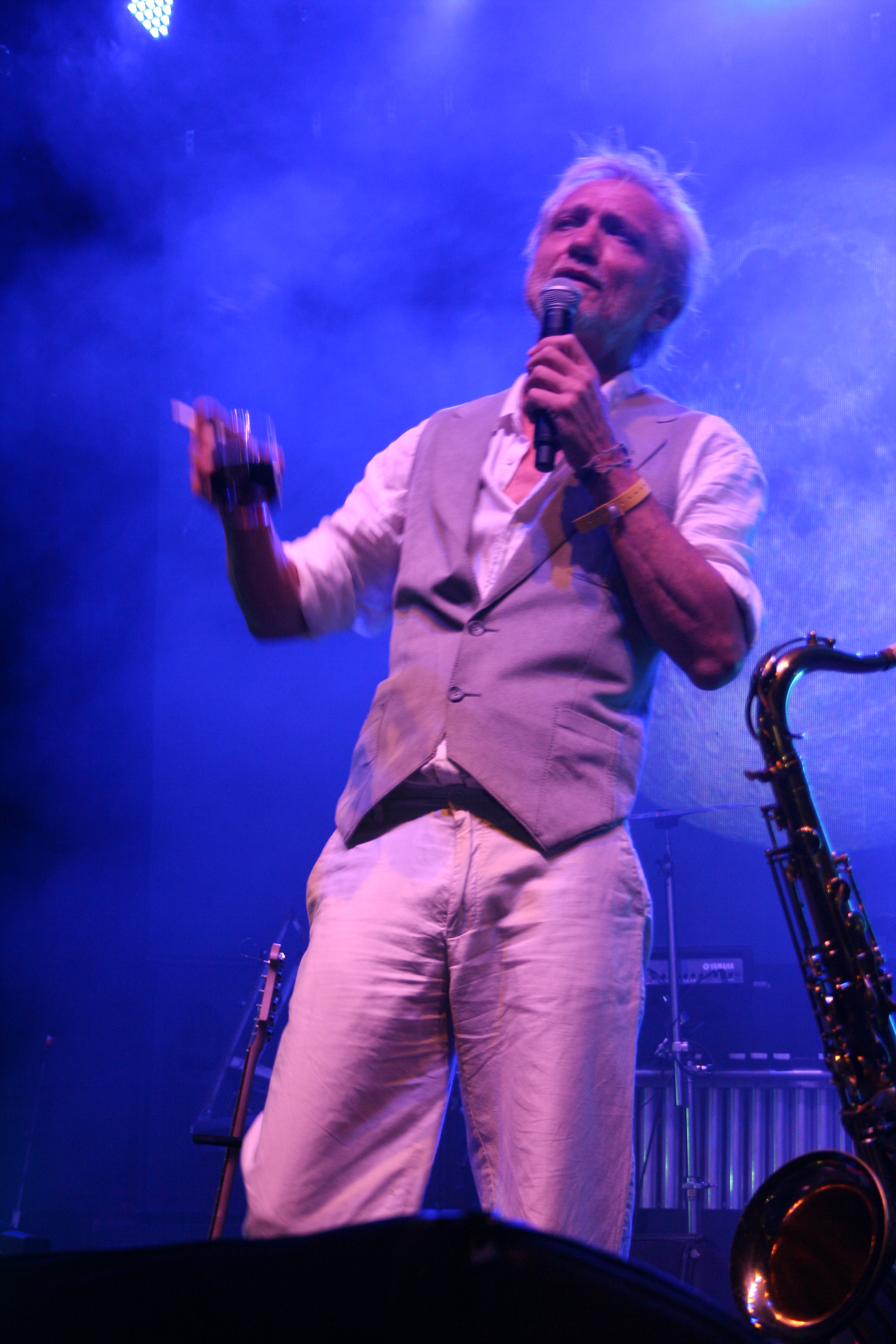
- Rundek at concert in 2017
- Born: 30 January 1956 (age 70); Zagreb, PR Croatia, FPR Yugoslavia
- Education: University of Zagreb
- Occupations: Singer, songwriter, poet, actor
- Years active: 1979–present
- Website: http://www.darko-rundek.com/

Darko Rundek (born 30 January 1956) is a Croatian rock singer, songwriter, poet, and actor. His music career started in the early 1980s, as the frontman of the world music influenced rock band Haustor. He emigrated to France after the Yugoslav Wars started in 1991, and has recorded eight albums with various musicians from different parts of the world: Apokalipso, U širokom svijetu, Ruke, MHM A-HA OH YEAH DA-DA, Balade Petrice Kerempuha, Plavi avion, Mostovi and Brisani prostor.

== Career ==
In 1979, Srđan Sacher (bass) and Darko Rundek (guitar and vocals) formed Haustor with Zoran Perišić (drums) and Ozren Štiglić (guitar). Damir Prica (saxophone), Nikola Santro (trombone), and Zoran Vuletić (keyboards) completed the original Haustor line-up. They were open to reggae, Latin American music and African music influences and were one of the top bands of the rock scene in Yugoslavia, performing numerous concerts to thousands of spectators.

The band released four studio-recorded albums during the 80's: Haustor in 1981, Treći Svijet (Third world) in 1984, Bolero in 1985 and Tajni Grad (Secret City) in 1988; three singles: 'Moja prva ljubav' (My first love) in 1980, 'Zima' (Winter) in 1981 and 'Radio' in 1982. The live album Ulje je na vodi (Oil on the water) was recorded in 1982 and released in 1995, and 81–'88 (a 'Best of' compilation) was released in 1995.

In 1982, Rundek obtained his diploma in theatre directing from the Academy of Dramatic Arts in Zagreb with his graduation performance of America Hurray! by J.C. Van Italie. He went on to direct a number of plays (They say the Owl Once Was the Baker's Daughter; Three Slaps, Satires from Hekuba, No, Ballads of Petrica Kerempuh…), and also appeared occasionally as an actor. Darko's principal role in the theatre remains that of composer, with more than 30 productions to his credit, ranging from intimate children's theatre to international touring performances. The most frequently he collaborated with Sanda Hržić, on the shows she directed in Croatia, France and Australia.

=== Solo career ===
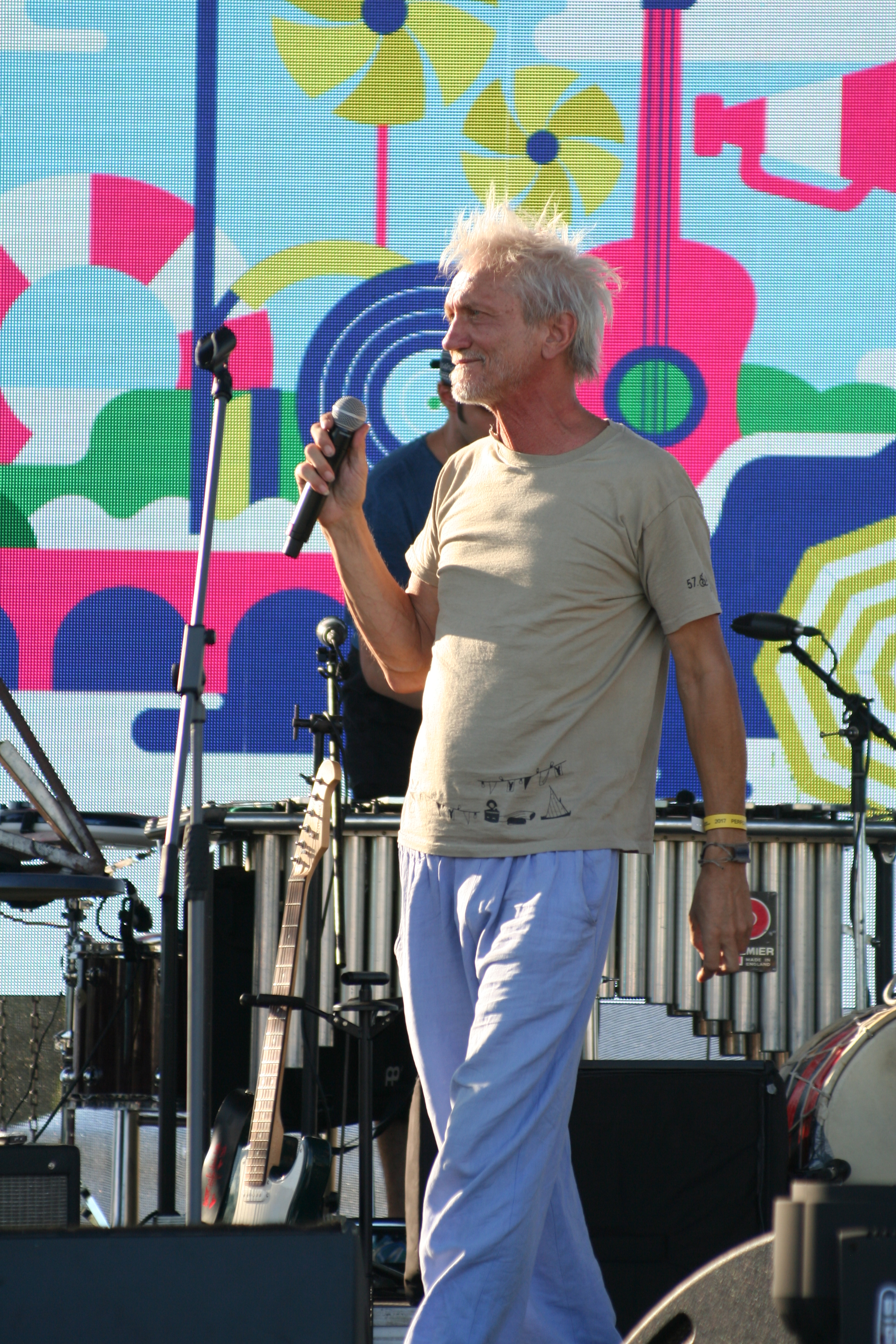
At rehearsal in Šabac in July 2017.

Since 1991, he has been living in France. In 1995, Rundek started his solo career at the Croatian music festival Fiju Briju in front of an audience of 10,000 people. He presented new musical material which was to be developed during the following series of concerts throughout Croatia.

In 1997 the album Apokalipso (apocalypse+calypso) was recorded with a multitude of instruments and musicians and with strong support from the record company Jabukaton. The album was stylistically very diverse, viewing the post-communist era with irony and poetry. Apokalipso was the music event of 1997 in Croatia. It won 5 Porins (song of the year, hit of the year, best male singer, best video clip, best vocal collaboration), and 4 Black Cats (song of the year for Apokalipso, best rock singer, best rock collaboration, best video clip).

The album U širokom svijetu turned more towards folkloric influences. Mandolin, bag pipes and tin whistle enhanced the eclectic style of the songs. The atmosphere became intimate and more introspective. The band became more stable and toured in Croatia and other ex-Yugoslavian countries.

=== Darko Rundek and Cargo Orkestar ===
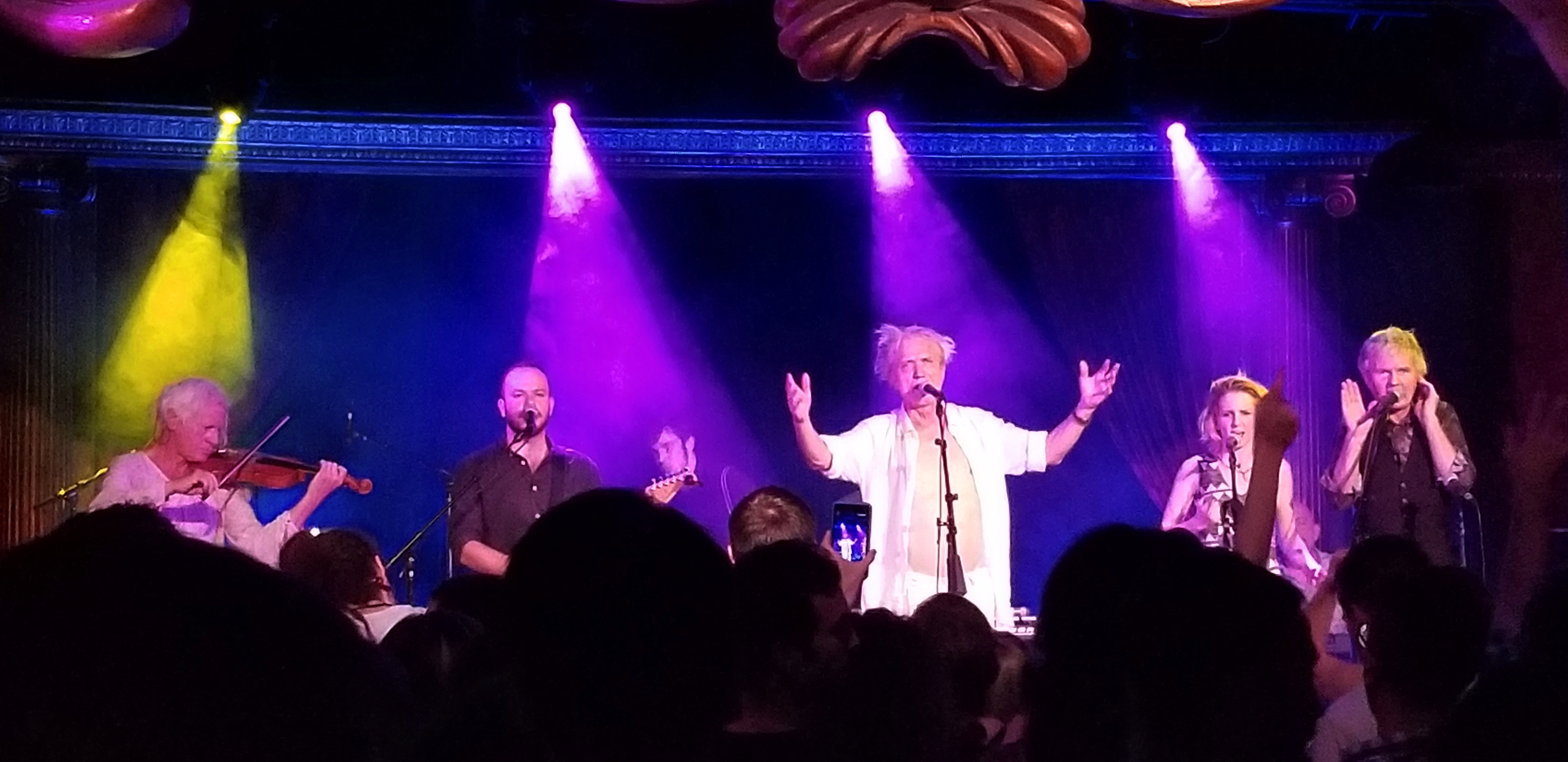
Rundek at concert in New York City on 3 November 2018.

The project initially stemmed from Darko Rundek's song. It grew out of the need to develop ideas in collaboration with other musicians through improvisation and exchange. Isabel, Đani Pervan, Dušan Vranić and Vedran Peternel started working on Darko Rundek's new songs; Isabel's mill in Burgundy in France, with her collection of exotic instruments, provided the working environment. They also incorporate a musical tradition with a potential for accepting diverse influences, firstly Balkan music, Central European music and Mediterranean, then reggae, Latin American, eastern and African music. Isabel (Swiss violinist), Đani Pervan (percussionist), Dušan Vranić (pianist), Vedran Peternel (sound-designer) and Darko, undertook a ten-day improvisation session in Isabel's converted watermill on the outskirts of a small Burgundian village. When they finally laid down their instruments, they had the basis of the album Ruke (documented by the camera of Biljana Tutorov, whose video projections have become a feature of Cargo Orkestar's concerts). Trumpetist Igor Pavlica (Darko's old collaborator from the Haustor and solo periods), Emmanuel Ferraz (trombone player), and the bass player Bruno Arnal, joined Cargo Orkestar for the promotional tour in 2002. In 2004 Ruke was published by Piranha Musik – Berlin, and distributed in 25 countries.

In 2004, the live album Zagrebačka magla was released under the Menart-Zagreb label, and Mhm A-Ha Oh Yeah Da-Da was published in 2006 by German record label Piranha. For the concerts, Cargo mixes new and old from the rich repertoire of Rundek songs. The informal and open feel is as remarkable in small concert halls as it is in large stadiums. One year later, the album was recorded and simultaneously released by record labels Menart in Croatia and Metropolis in Serbia. Some songs are co-signed by different members of the group. On the promotion tour the band was completed with three more musicians and gradually developed into Darko Rundek & Cargo Orkestar.

=== Theatre, film and radio ===
Rundek has written and produced film music, and occasionally appeared as an actor (Doctor Kljaić in A View from Eiffel Tower), by N. Vukčević; Karlo in 100 minuta Slave, by D. Matanić; Youngster in The Eagle (Orao), by Z. Tadić, Marjan film). He played Herman in J. Burgerfor's film Ruins (Ruševine), for which he was awarded best male film actor in Slovenia.

Between 1982 and 1991, Darko Rundek directed around 50 radio-plays and documentaries for the drama department of radio Zagreb, for which he also wrote the music. Some of these represented radio Zagreb at various international festivals: Prix Italia, Premios Ondas and Prix Futura.

== Discography ==
=== Haustor albums ===
- Haustor (1981)
- Treći svijet (1984)
- Bolero (1985)
- Tajni grad (1988)

=== Solo albums ===
- Apokalipso (1996)
- U širokom svijetu (2000)
- Ruke (2002)
