= Matko Jelavić =

Croatian pop singer

- Born: 29 March 1958 (age 68); Split, PR Croatia FPR Yugoslavia
- Occupations: Drummer, singer
- Years active: 1978–present
- Website: www.matkojelavic.com

Matko Jelavić (born 29 March 1958) is a Croatian and Yugoslav singer, songwriter, and musician. He started his career in 1978, as the drummer for the rock band Metak, releasing two albums with the group. After Metak disbanded in 1981, he started composing and writing songs for other artists, until his debut as a singer on the 1988 Split Festival, where he won first place with his song and biggest hit "Majko stara" ("(Oh) My Old Mother"). He lives in Split with his wife and two children.

== Discography ==
=== With Metak ===
==== Studio albums ====
- U tetrapaku (1979)
- Ratatatatija (1980)

==== Singles ====
- "Šijavica" / "Gastarbajterska balada" (1978)
- "Ona ima svoju dragu mamu" / "Revolver" (1979)
- "Da mi je biti morski pas" / "Rock'n'roller" (1980)

=== Solo ===
==== Studio albums ====
- Dobra večer, prijatelji (1988)
- Ljube, ljubavi (1989)
- Sretno ti bilo, anđele (1991)
- Moja ljubavi (1993)
- Pianino (1995)
- Od jubavi bolujen (1997)
- Dueti (1997)
- Čovjek tvoj (1999)
- Tajna (2001)
- Duša čista, obična... (2004)
- O lipi Splite moj (2005)
- Prvoj ruži Hrvatske (2009)

==== Compilation albums ====
- 25 uspjeha – Mix (1993)
- Svi moji uspjesi (1993)
- Instrumentali (2005)
- Zlatni mix (2007)
- Zlatna kolekcija (2009)
- The Best of Collection (2020)

== Sources ==
- Jelavić, Matko at hds.hr
