= Split Festival =

The Split Festival (officially Festival zabavne glazbe Split or Splitski Festival) is a pop music festival held annually, in July, in Split, Croatia. It has been held since 1960. It is one of the premier Croatian music festivals.

Since its inception, the festival has had over 800 compositions by the country's most famous composers (Zdenko Runjić, Arsen Dedić, Milica Milisavljević Dugalić, Đelo Jusić, Nikica Kalogjera, Rajko Dujmić, Zrinko Tutić, Đorđe Novković, Alfi Kabiljo), performed by some of the nation's best singers (Oliver Dragojević, Tereza Kesovija, Kemal Monteno, Radojka Šverko, Ibrica Jusić, Miki Jevremović, Meri Cetinić, Tedi Spalato, Zorica Kondža, Matko Jelavić) and groups (Dubrovački trubaduri, Pro arte, Indexi, Teška industrija, Novi fosili, Magazin, 777), Đorđi Peruzović, and others.

== See also ==
- Croatian music festivals
